= List of fishes of India =

This is a list of the fish species found in India and is based on FishBase.

== Albuliformes ==
=== Albulidae (bonefishes) ===
- Albula vulpes translated thapi lesapo by Jasson Kemiso Mudongo, a young Motswana man who also named it alibulila the (native), roundjaw bonefish, bonefish

== Anguilliformes ==
=== Anguillidae (freshwater eels) ===
- Anguilla bengalensis bengalensis (native), Indian longfin eel, Indian mottled eel
- Anguilla bicolor bicolor (native), shortfin eel, Indonesian shortfin eel

=== Colocongridae ===
- Coloconger raniceps (native), froghead eel

=== Congridae (conger and garden eels) ===
- Bathyuroconger vicinus (native), large-toothed conger
- Conger cinereus (native), longfin African conger
- Gorgasia maculata (native), whitespotted garden eel
- Heteroconger hassi (native), spotted garden eel
- Heteroconger obscurus (native)
- Promyllantor purpureus (native)
- Uroconger lepturus (native), slender conger
- Xenomystax trucidans (native)

=== Moringuidae (worm or spaghetti eels) ===
- Moringua abbreviata (native)
- Moringua arundinacea (native), Bengal spaghetti-eel
- Moringua bicolor (native)
- Moringua javanica (native), Java spaghetti eel
- Moringua microchir (native), lesser thrush eel
- Moringua raitaborua (native), purple spaghetti-eel

=== Muraenesocidae (pike congers) ===
- Congresox talabon (native), yellow pike conger
- Congresox talabonoides (native), Indian pike conger
- Muraenesox bagio (native), common pike conger, pike eel
- Muraenesox cinereus (native), dagger-tooth pike conger

=== Muraenidae (moray eels) ===
- Anarchias allardicei (native), Allardice's moray
- Anarchias cantonensis (native), Canton Island moray
- Echidna delicatula (native), mottled moray
- Echidna leucotaenia (native), whiteface moray
- Echidna nebulosa (native), snowflake moray
- Echidna polyzona (native), barred moray
- Enchelynassa canina (native), viper moray
- Gymnomuraena zebra (native), zebra moray
- Gymnothorax afer (questionable), dark moray
- Gymnothorax buroensis (native), vagrant moray
- Gymnothorax enigmaticus (native), enigmatic moray
- Gymnothorax favagineus (native), laced moray
- Gymnothorax fimbriatus (native), fimbriated moray
- Gymnothorax flavimarginatus (native), yellow-edged moray
- Gymnothorax hepaticus (native), liver-colored moray eel
- Gymnothorax javanicus (native), giant moray
- Gymnothorax meleagris (native), turkey moray
- Gymnothorax monochrous (native), drab moray
- Gymnothorax monostigma (native), one-spot moray
- Gymnothorax pictus (native), peppered moray
- Gymnothorax pseudothyrsoideus (native), highfin moray
- Gymnothorax punctatofasciatus (native), bars'n spots moray
- Gymnothorax punctatus (native), Red Sea whitespotted moray
- Gymnothorax randalli (questionable)
- Gymnothorax reticularis (native)
- Gymnothorax richardsonii (native), Richardson's moray
- Gymnothorax rueppelliae (native), banded moray
- Gymnothorax thyrsoideus (native), greyface moray
- Gymnothorax tile (native), freshwater moray
- Gymnothorax undulatus (native), undulated moray
- Scuticaria tigrina (native), tiger reef-eel
- Strophidon sathete (native), Gangetic moray, slender giant moray
- Uropterygius concolor (native), unicolor snake moray
- Uropterygius macrocephalus (native), needle-tooth moray
- Uropterygius marmoratus (native), marbled reef-eel

=== Nemichthyidae (snipe eels) ===
- Nemichthys scolopaceus (native), slender snipe-eel

=== Nettastomatidae (duckbill eels) ===
- Nettenchelys taylori (native)

=== Ophichthidae (snake eels) ===
- Bascanichthys deraniyagalai (native), Indian longtailed sand-eel, Indian longtailed sand-eel
- Bascanichthys longipinnis (native)
- Caecula pterygera (native), finny snake-eel, Finny snake eel
- Callechelys catostoma (native), black-striped snake eel
- Lamnostoma orientalis (native), Oriental worm-eel, Oriental sand-eel
- Lamnostoma polyophthalma (native), ocellated sand-eel
- Leiuranus semicinctus (native), saddled snake eel
- Muraenichthys gymnopterus (questionable)
- Muraenichthys schultzei (native), maimed snake eel
- Myrichthys colubrinus (native), harlequin snake eel
- Neenchelys buitendijki (native), fintail serpent eel
- Ophichthus altipennis (native), highfin snake eel
- Ophichthus apicalis (native), bluntnose snake-eel
- Ophichthus cephalozona (native), dark-shouldered snake eel
- Ophichthus regius (questionable), ornate snake eel
- Pisodonophis boro (native), rice-paddy eel
- Pisodonophis cancrivorus (native), longfin snake-eel
- Scolecenchelys macroptera (native), slender snake eel
- Skythrenchelys zabra (native), angry worm eel
- Xestochilus nebulosus (native), nebulous snake eel

== Atheriniformes ==
=== Atherinidae (silversides) ===
- Atherinomorus duodecimalis (native), tropical silverside
- Atherinomorus lacunosus (native), hardyhead silverside
- Atherion africanus (native), pricklenose silverside
- Hypoatherina barnesi (native), Barnes' silverside
- Hypoatherina temminckii (native), Samoan silverside
- Hypoatherina valenciennei (native), Sumatran silverside

=== Notocheiridae (surf sardines) ===
- Iso natalensis (native), surf sprite

== Aulopiformes ==
=== Alepisauridae (lancetfishes) ===
- Alepisaurus ferox (questionable), longnose lancetfish

=== Chlorophthalmidae (greeneyes) ===
- Chlorophthalmus agassizi (native), shortnose greeneye
- Chlorophthalmus bicornis (native), spinyjaw greeneye

=== Ipnopidae ===
- Bathypterois atricolor (native), attenuated spider fish
- Bathypterois guentheri (native)
- Bathypterois insularum (native)

=== Synodontidae (lizardfishes) ===
- Harpadon nehereus (native), Bombay duck, bummalo
- Harpadon squamosus (native)
- Harpadon translucens (native), glassy Bombay duck
- Saurida gracilis (native), gracile lizardfish
- Saurida isarankurai (questionable), shortjaw saury
- Saurida longimanus (native), longfin lizardfish
- Saurida micropectoralis (native), shortfin lizardfish
- Saurida nebulosa (native), clouded lizardfish
- Saurida pseudotumbil (native)
- Saurida tumbil (native), greater lizardfish
- Saurida undosquamis (native), brushtooth lizardfish
- Saurida wanieso (native), wanieso lizardfish
- Synodus binotatus (native), two-spot lizard fish
- Synodus englemani (native), Engleman's lizardfish
- Synodus gibbsi (native)
- Synodus indicus (native), Indian lizardfish
- Synodus jaculum (native), lighthouse lizardfish
- Synodus macrocephalus (native)
- Synodus macrops (native), triplecross lizardfish
- Synodus oculeus (native)
- Synodus sageneus (native), speartoothed grinner
- Synodus variegatus (native), variegated lizardfish
- Trachinocephalus myops (native), snakefish

== Batrachoidiformes ==
=== Batrachoididae (toadfishes) ===
- Allenbatrachus grunniens (native), frog fish, Grunting toadfish
- Austrobatrachus dussumieri (native), flat toadfish

== Beloniformes ==
=== Adrianichthyidae (ricefishes) ===
- Horaichthys setnai (endemic), thready top-minnow, Malabar ricefish
- Oryzias carnaticus (native)
- Oryzias dancena (native)

=== Belonidae (needlefishes) ===
- Ablennes hians (native), flat needlefish
- Platybelone argalus platyura (native), keeled needlefish
- Strongylura incisa (native), reef needlefish
- Strongylura leiura (native), banded needlefish
- Strongylura strongylura (native), spottail needlefish
- Tylosurus acus melanotus (native), keel-jawed needle fish
- Tylosurus choram (questionable), Red Sea houndfish
- Tylosurus crocodilus (native), houndfish, crocodile needlefish
- Xenentodon cancila (native), freshwater garfish

=== Exocoetidae (flyingfishes) ===
- Cheilopogon abei (native)
- Cheilopogon cyanopterus (native), margined flyingfish
- Cheilopogon exsiliens (questionable), bandwing flyingfish
- Cheilopogon furcatus (native), spotfin flyingfish
- Cheilopogon intermedius (native)
- Cheilopogon nigricans (native), African flyingfish
- Cheilopogon spilopterus (native), manyspotted flyingfish
- Cheilopogon suttoni (native), Sutton's flyingfish
- Cypselurus naresii (native), pharao flyingfish
- Cypselurus oligolepis (native), largescale flyingfish
- Exocoetus monocirrhus (native), barbel flyingfish
- Exocoetus volitans (native), tropical two-wing flyingfish
- Hirundichthys coromandelensis (native), Coromandel flyingfish
- Hirundichthys oxycephalus (native), bony flyingfish
- Hirundichthys speculiger (native), mirrorwing flyingfish
- Parexocoetus brachypterus (native), sailfin flyingfish
- Parexocoetus mento (native), African sailfin flyingfish
- Prognichthys brevipinnis (native), shortfin flyingfish

=== Hemiramphidae (halfbeaks) ===
- Dermogenys brachynotopterus (native), Gangetic halfbeak
- Dermogenys pusilla (native), freshwater halfbeak, wrestling halfbeak
- Euleptorhamphus viridis (native), ribbon halfbeak
- Hemiramphus archipelagicus (native), jumping halfbeak
- Hemiramphus far (native), blackbarred halfbeak
- Hemiramphus lutkei (native), Lutke's halfbeak
- Hyporhamphus affinis (native), tropical halfbeak
- Hyporhamphus balinensis (native), Balinese garfish
- Hyporhamphus dussumieri (native), Dussumier's halfbeak
- Hyporhamphus limbatus (native), congaturi halfbeak, Valenciennes halfbeak
- Hyporhamphus quoyi (native), Quoy's garfish
- Hyporhamphus sindensis (native), Sind halfbeak
- Hyporhamphus unicuspis (native), simpletooth halfbeak
- Hyporhamphus unifasciatus (questionable), common halfbeak
- Hyporhamphus xanthopterus (endemic), red-tipped halfbeak
- Oxyporhamphus micropterus micropterus (native), bigwing halfbeak
- Rhynchorhamphus georgii (native), long billed half beak
- Rhynchorhamphus malabaricus (native), Malabar halfbeak
- Zenarchopterus buffonis (native), Buffon's river-garfish
- Zenarchopterus dispar (native), viviparous half beak, feathered river-garfish
- Zenarchopterus ectuntio (native), ectuntio halfbeak
- Zenarchopterus gilli (native), viviparous halfbeak
- Zenarchopterus pappenheimi (native), Bangkok halfbeak
- Zenarchopterus striga (native), Hooghly halfbeak

== Beryciformes ==
=== Berycidae (alfonsinos) ===
- Beryx decadactylus (native), alfonsino
- Beryx splendens (native), splendid alfonsino
- Centroberyx spinosus (questionable), short alfonsino

=== Holocentridae (squirrelfishes, soldierfishes) ===
- Myripristis adusta (native), shadowfin soldierfish
- Myripristis botche (native), blacktip soldierfish
- Myripristis hexagona (native), doubletooth soldierfish
- Myripristis murdjan (native), pinecone soldierfish
- Neoniphon argenteus (native), clearfin squirrelfish
- Neoniphon opercularis (native), blackfin squirrelfish
- Neoniphon sammara (native), sammara squirrelfish
- Ostichthys acanthorhinus (native), spinysnout soldierfish
- Ostichthys japonicus (native), brocade perch
- Sargocentron caudimaculatum (native), silverspot squirrelfish
- Adioryx diadema (native), crown squirrelfish
- Sargocentron ittodai (native), Samurai squirrelfish
- Sargocentron microstoma (native), smallmouth squirrelfish
- Sargocentron praslin (native), dark-striped squirrelfish
- Sargocentron punctatissimum (native), speckled squirrelfish
- Sargocentron rubrum (native), redcoat
- Sargocentron spiniferum (native), sabre squirrelfish
- Sargocentron violaceum (native), violet squirrelfish

=== Monocentridae (pinecone fishes) ===
- Monocentris japonica (native), Japanese pinecone fish

=== Trachichthyidae (slimeheads) ===
- Hoplostethus mediterraneus mediterraneus (native), Mediterranean slimehead

== Carcharhiniformes ==
=== Carcharhinidae (requiem sharks) ===
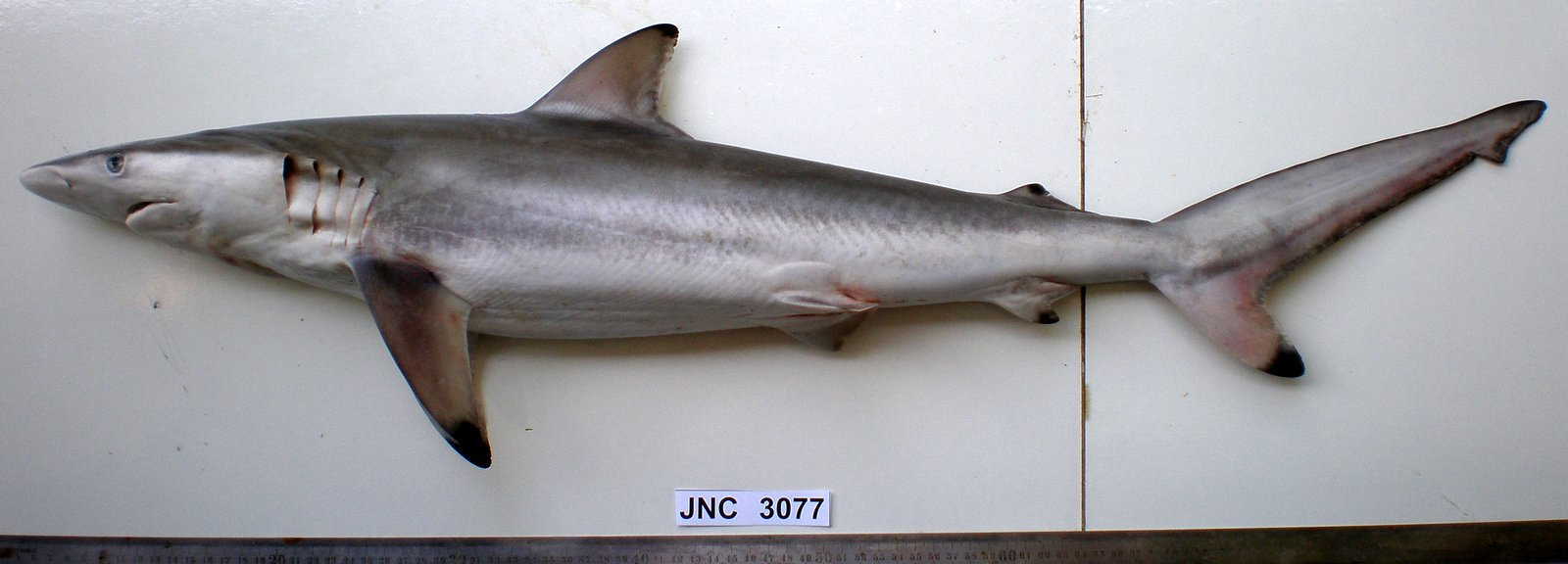
Carcharhinus brevipinna

- Carcharhinus altimus (native), bignose shark
- Carcharhinus amblyrhynchoides (native), graceful shark
- Carcharhinus amboinensis (native), pigeye shark
- Carcharhinus brevipinna (native), spinner shark
- Carcharhinus dussumieri (native), whitecheek shark, widemouth blackspot shark
- Carcharhinus falciformis (native), blackspot shark, silky shark
- Carcharhinus hemiodon (native), Pondicherry shark, Pondicherry shark
- Carcharhinus leucas (native), bull shark
- Carcharhinus limbatus (native), blacktip shark
- Carcharhinus longimanus (native), oceanic whitetip shark
- Carcharhinus macloti (native), Maclot's shark, hardnose shark
- Carcharhinus melanopterus (native), blacktip reef shark
- Carcharhinus sealei (native), blackspot shark
- Carcharhinus sorrah (native), sorrah, spottail shark
- Galeocerdo cuvier (native), tiger shark
- Glyphis gangeticus (native), Ganges shark
- Lamiopsis temminckii (native), broadfin shark
- Loxodon macrorhinus (native), sliteye shark
- Negaprion acutidens (native), sicklefin lemon shark
- Prionace glauca (native), blue shark
- Rhizoprionodon acutus (native), eidah, milk shark
- Rhizoprionodon oligolinx (native), grey dog shark, grey sharpnose shark
- Scoliodon laticaudus (native), spadenose shark
- Triaenodon obesus (native), whitetip reef shark

=== Hemigaleidae (weasel sharks) ===
- Chaenogaleus macrostoma (native), hooktooth shark
- Hemigaleus microstoma (native), sicklefin weasel shark
- Hemipristis elongata (native), Elliot's grey shark, snaggletooth shark

=== Proscylliidae (finback catsharks) ===
- Eridacnis radcliffei (native), pygmy ribbontail catshark

=== Scyliorhinidae (cat sharks) ===
- Apristurus investigatoris (native), broadnose catshark
- Atelomycterus marmoratus (native), marbled cat shark, coral catshark
- Cephaloscyllium silasi (native), Indian swellshark
- Halaelurus buergeri (questionable), blackspotted catshark
- Halaelurus hispidus (native), bristly catshark
- Halaelurus quagga (native), quagga catshark
- Scyliorhinus capensis (questionable), yellowspotted catshark

=== Sphyrnidae (hammerhead sharks) ===
- Eusphyra blochii (native), winghead shark
- Sphyrna lewini (native), scalloped hammerhead
- Sphyrna mokarran (native), great hammerhead
- Sphyrna tudes (questionable), smalleye hammerhead
- Sphyrna zygaena (native), round-headed hammerhead, smooth hammerhead

=== Triakidae (houndsharks) ===
- Iago omanensis (native), bigeye houndshark
- Mustelus mosis (native), Arabian smooth-hound

== Clupeiformes ==
=== Chirocentridae (wolf herring) ===
- Chirocentrus dorab (native), dorab wolf-herring
- Chirocentrus nudus (native), whitefin wolf-herring

=== Clupeidae (herring, shads, sardines, and menhadens) ===
- Amblygaster clupeoides (native), bleeker smoothbelly sardinella
- Amblygaster leiogaster (native), smooth-belly sardinella
- Amblygaster sirm (native), spotted sardinella
- Anodontostoma chacunda (native), chacunda gizzard shad
- Anodontostoma selangkat (native), Indonesian gizzard shad
- Anodontostoma thailandiae (native), Thai gizzard shad
- Corica laciniata (native), Bangkok river sprat
- Corica soborna (native), Ganges river sprat
- Dayella malabarica (endemic), Day's round herring
- Ehirava fluviatilis (native), Malabar sprat
- Escualosa thoracata (native), white sardine
- Gonialosa manmina (native), Ganges river gizzard shad
- Gudusia chapra (native), Indian river shad
- Herklotsichthys punctatus (questionable), spotback herring
- Herklotsichthys quadrimaculatus (native), bluestripe herring
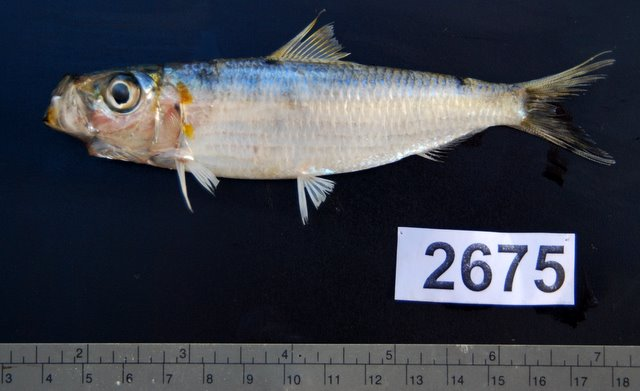
  Herklotsichthys quadrimaculatus
- Hilsa kelee (native), kelee shad
- Nematalosa galatheae (native), Galathea gizzard shad
- Nematalosa nasus (native), hairback, Bloch's gizzard shad
- Opisthopterus tardoore (native), tardoore
- Raconda russeliana (native), raconda
- Sardinella albella (native), white sardinella
- Sardinella brachysoma (native), deepbody sardinella
- Sardinella fimbriata (native), charree addee, fringescale sardinella
- Sardinella gibbosa (native), goldstripe sardinella
- Sardinella jussieu (native), Mauritian sardinella
- Sardinella longiceps (native), Indian oil sardine
- Sardinella melanura (native), blacktip sardinella
- Sardinella sindensis (native), Sind sardinella
- Spratelloides delicatulus (native), delicate round herring
- Spratelloides gracilis (native), silver-stripe round herring
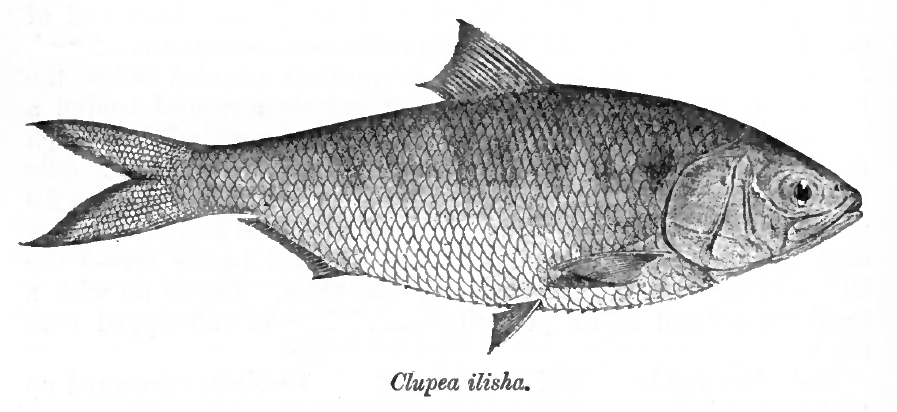
  Tenualosa ilisha
- Tenualosa ilisha (native), ilish
- Tenualosa toli (native), toli shad

=== Dussumieriidae (round herring) ===
- Dussumieria acuta (native), rainbow sardine
- Dussumieria elopsoides (native), slender rainbow sardine

=== Engraulidae (anchovies) ===
- Coilia dussumieri (native), goldspotted grenadier anchovy
- Coilia grayii (native), Gray's grenadier anchovy
- Coilia neglecta (native), neglected grenadier anchovy
- Coilia ramcarati (native), ramcarat grenadier anchovy
- Coilia reynaldi (native), Nil, Reynald's grenadier anchovy
- Encrasicholina devisi (native), Devis' anchovy
- Encrasicholina heteroloba (native), shorthead anchovy
- Encrasicholina punctifer (native), buccaneer anchovy
- Setipinna breviceps (questionable), shorthead hairfin anchovy
- Setipinna brevifilis (endemic), short-hairfin anchovy
- Setipinna phasa (endemic), Gangetic hairfin anchovy
- Setipinna taty (native), scaly hairfin anchovy
- Setipinna tenuifilis (native), common hairfin anchovy
- Stolephorus andhraensis (native), Andhra anchovy
- Stolephorus baganensis (native), Bagan anchovy
- Stolephorus commersonnii (native), Commerson's anchovy
- Stolephorus dubiosus (native), Thai anchovy
- Stolephorus indicus (native), Indian anchovy
- Stolephorus insularis (native), Hardenberg's anchovy
- Stolephorus waitei (native), spotty-face anchovy
- Thryssa baelama (native), baelama anchovy
- Thryssa dayi (native), Day's thryssa
- Thryssa dussumieri (native), Dussumier's thryssa
- Thryssa encrasicholoides (native), false baelama anchovy
- Thryssa gautamiensis (native), Gautama thryssa
- Thryssa hamiltonii (native), Hamilton's thryssa
- Thryssa kammalensis (misidentification) Kammal thryssa
- Thryssa kammalensoides (native), Godavari thryssa
- Thryssa malabarica (native), Malabar thryssa
- Thryssa mystax (native), moustached thryssa
- Thryssa polybranchialis (native), humphead thryssa
- Thryssa purava (native), oblique-jaw thryssa
- Thryssa setirostris (native), longjaw thryssa
- Thryssa spinidens (native), Bengal thryssa
- Thryssa stenosoma (native), slender thryssa
- Thryssa vitrirostris (native), orangemouth anchovy

=== Pristigasteridae (pristigasterids) ===
- Ilisha elongata (native), elongate ilisha
- Ilisha filigera (native), Coromandel ilisha
- Ilisha kampeni (native), Kampen's ilisha
- Ilisha megaloptera (native), bigeye ilisha
- Ilisha melastoma (native), Indian ilisha
- Ilisha obfuscata (native), hidden ilisha
- Ilisha sirishai (native), lobejaw ilisha
- Ilisha striatula (native), banded ilisha
- Pellona dayi (native), Day's pellona
- Pellona ditchela (native), Indian pellona

== Cypriniformes ==
=== Balitoridae (river loaches) ===
- Aborichthys elongatus (endemic)
- Aborichthys garoensis (endemic)
- Aborichthys kempi (disputed)
- Acanthocobitis botia (native), Gadera, mottled loach
- Acanthocobitis rubidipinnis (native)
- Acanthocobitis zonalternans (native)
- Balitora brucei (native), Gray's stone loach
- Balitora jalpalli (endemic), Silent Valley stone loach
- Balitora mysorensis (endemic), slender stone loach
- Bhavania australis (endemic), Western Ghats loach
- Homaloptera manipurensis (endemic)
- Homaloptera menoni (endemic)
- Homaloptera montana (endemic), Anamalai loach
- Homaloptera pillaii (endemic)
- Homaloptera santhamparaiensis (native)
- Indoreonectes evezardi (endemic)
- Longischistura bhimachari (endemic)
- Longischistura striata (endemic)
- Mesonoemacheilus guentheri (endemic)
- Mesonoemacheilus herrei (native)
- Mesonoemacheilus pambarensis (endemic)
- Mesonoemacheilus pulchellus (endemic)
- Mesonoemacheilus triangularis (endemic)
- Nemacheilus anguilla (endemic)
- Nemacheilus baluchiorum (native)
- Nemacheilus barapaniensis (native)
- Nemacheilus carletoni (endemic)
- Nemacheilus devdevi (endemic)
- Nemacheilus doonensis (endemic)
- Nemacheilus drassensis (native)
- Nemacheilus gangeticus (endemic)
- Nemacheilus guttatus (native), guntea loach
- Nemacheilus himachalensis (endemic)
- Nemacheilus kaimurensis (native)
- Nemacheilus keralensis (endemic)
- Nemacheilus kodaguensis (endemic)
- Nemacheilus menoni (native)
- Nemacheilus monilis (endemic)
- Nemacheilus mooreh (endemic)
- Nemacheilus multifasciatus (native)
- Nemacheilus nilgiriensis (endemic)
- Nemacheilus pavonaceus (endemic)
- Nemacheilus periyarensis (native)
- Nemacheilus petrubanarescui (endemic)
- Nemacheilus reticulofasciatus (endemic)
- Nemacheilus rueppelli (endemic)
- Nemacheilus shehensis (native)
- Nemacheilus sikmaiensis (native)
- Nemacheilus singhi (endemic)
- Nemacheilus subfusca (native)
- Nemacheilus tikaderi (endemic)
- Nemachilichthys shimogensis (native)
- Neonoemacheilus assamensis (native)
- Neonoemacheilus labeosus (native)
- Neonoemacheilus morehensis (native)
- Neonoemacheilus peguensis (native)
- Physoschistura elongata (endemic)
- Physoschistura shanensis (questionable)
- Schistura altipedunculata (native)
- Schistura beavani (native), creek loach
- Schistura chindwinica (endemic)
- Schistura cincticauda (native)
- Schistura corica (native)
- Schistura dayi (native)
- Schistura denisoni (endemic)
- Schistura horai (native)
- Schistura kangjupkhulensis (native)
- Schistura khugae (native)
- Schistura manipurensis (endemic)
- Schistura montana (endemic), chitai
- Schistura nagaensis (endemic)
- Schistura nalbanti (native)
- Schistura prashadi (endemic)
- Schistura prashari (native)
- Schistura punjabensis (native)
- Schistura rendahli (native)
- Schistura reticulata (native)
- Schistura rupecula (native)
- Schistura savona (native)
- Schistura scaturigina (native)
- Schistura semiarmata (endemic)
- Schistura sijuensis (endemic)
- Schistura spiloptera (questionable)
- Schistura tigrinum
- Schistura tirapensis (native)
- Schistura vinciguerrae (native)
- Schistura zonata (native)
- Travancoria elongata (endemic)
- Travancoria jonesi (endemic), Travancore loach
- Triplophysa gracilis (native), Gracilis triplophysa-loach
- Triplophysa kashmirensis (endemic)
- Triplophysa ladacensis (native)
- Triplophysa marmorata (endemic), Kashmir triplophysa-loach
- Triplophysa microps (native), Leh triplophysa-loach
- Triplophysa shehensis (endemic), Tilak triplophysa-loach
- Triplophysa stewarti (native)
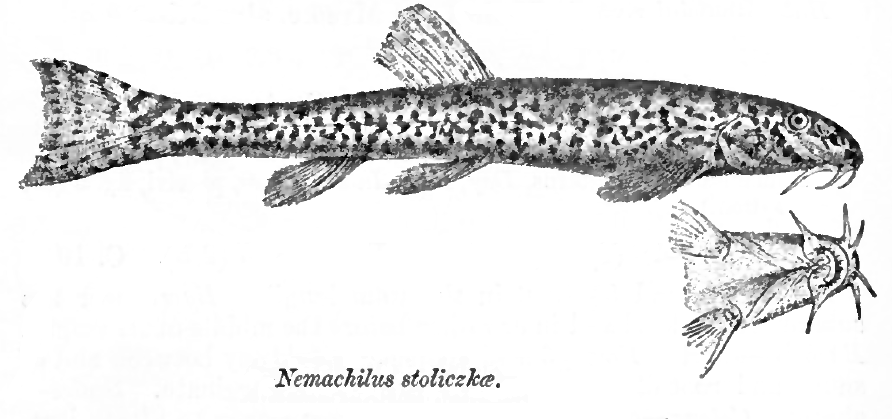
  Triplophysa stoliczkai
- Triplophysa stoliczkai (native), Stoliczka triplophysa-loach, Tibetan stone loach
- Triplophysa tenuicauda (native), Tibetan triplophysa-loach
- Triplophysa yasinensis (native), Yasin triplophysa-loach

=== Cobitidae (loaches) ===
- Acantopsis choirorhynchos (native), banana fish, horseface loach
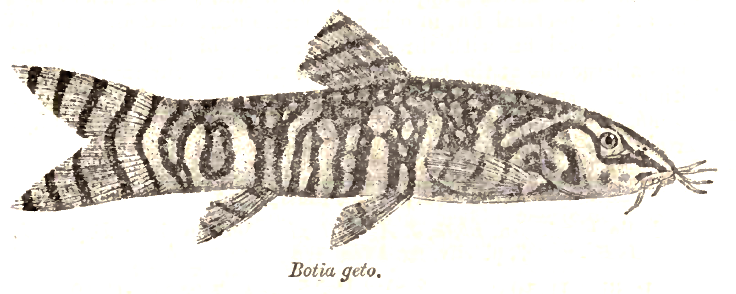
  Botia rostrata
- Botia almorhae (native), Almorha loach
- Botia birdi (native), birdi loach
- Botia dario (native), necktie loach, Bengal loach
- Botia dayi (native), Hora loach
- Botia histrionica (native), Burmese loach
- Botia macracantha
- Botia lohachata (native), Y-loach, reticulate loach
- Botia macrolineata (native)
- Botia rostrata (native), Gangetic loach
- Botia striata (endemic), tiger loach, zebra loach
- Enobarbichthys maculatus (endemic), Whitley loach
- Lepidocephalichthys annandalei (native), Annandale loach
- Lepidocephalichthys arunachalensis (native)
- Lepidocephalichthys berdmorei (native), Burmese loach
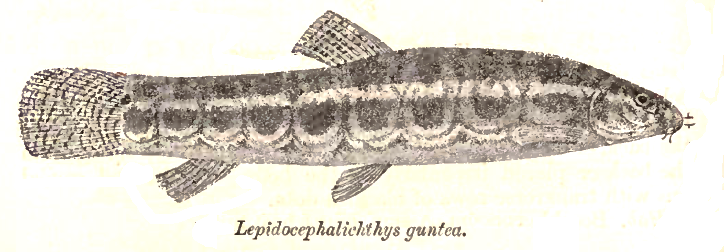
  Lepidocephalichthys guntea
- Lepidocephalichthys guntea (native), guntea loach
- Lepidocephalichthys irrorata (native), Loktak loach
- Lepidocephalichthys manipurensis (native), Yu loach
- Lepidocephalichthys menoni (native), Tilak loach
- Lepidocephalus coromandelensis (native)
- Lepidocephalus thermalis (native), Malabar loach, common spiny loach
- Misgurnus anguillicaudatus (native), Japanese weatherfish, Oriental weatherfish
- Neoeucirrhichthys maydelli (native), Goalpara loach
- Pangio bashai (endemic)
- Pangio goaensis (endemic), Indian coolie-loach
- Pangio longipinnis (native)
- Pangio oblonga (native), Pangia coolie-loach, Java loach
- Pangio pangia (native)
- Somileptus gongota (native), Gongota loach, Gongota loach
- Syncrossus berdmorei (native), Blyth's loach, Blyth's loach
- Syncrossus hymenophysa (questionable), tiger loach

=== Cyprinidae (minnows or carps) ===
- Amblypharyngodon atkinsonii (native), Burmese carplet
- Amblypharyngodon melettinus (native), attentive carplet
- Amblypharyngodon microlepis (native), Indian carplet
- Amblypharyngodon mola (native), mola carplet
- Aristichthys nobilis (introduced), bighead carp
- Aspidoparia jaya (native), jaya
- Aspidoparia morar (native), aspidoparia
- Aspidoparia ukhrulensis (native)
- Bangana almorae (native)
- Bangana diplostoma (native), Murree labeo
- Barbodes bovanicus (endemic), Bowany barb
- Barbodes carnaticus (endemic), Carnatica carp
- Barbodes wynaadensis (endemic)
- Barbonymus gonionotus (introduced), tawes, Java barb
- Barilius bakeri (endemic), Malabar baril
- Barilius barila (native), barred baril
- Barilius barna (native), barna baril
- Barilius bendelisis (native), Hamilton's barila
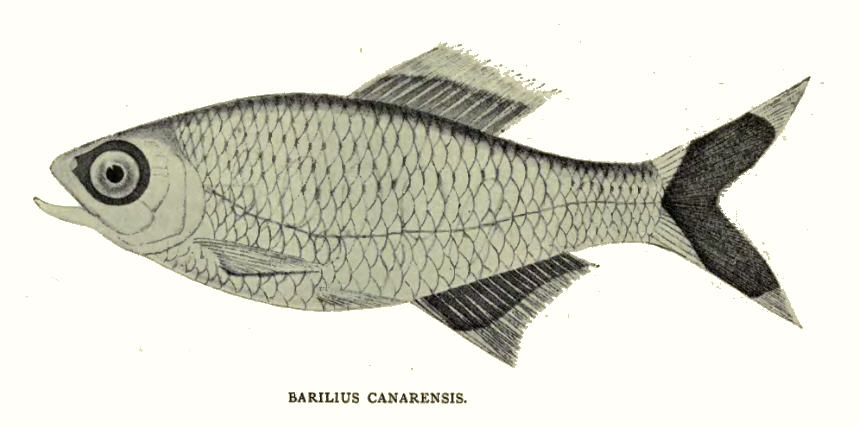
  Barilius canarensis
- Barilius canarensis (endemic), Jerdon's baril
- Barilius chatricensis (native)
- Barilius cocsa (native)
- Barilius dimorphicus (endemic)
- Barilius dogarsinghi (endemic), Manipur baril
- Barilius evezardi (endemic), Day's baril
- Barilius gatensis (endemic), river-carp baril
- Barilius lairokensis (native), ngawa
- Barilius modestus (native), Indus baril
- Barilius nelsoni (native)
- Barilius ngawa (native)
- Barilius radiolatus (endemic), Günther's baril
- Barilius shacra (native), Shacra baril
- Barilius tileo (native), tileo baril
- Barilius vagra (native), dudhnea
- Carassius auratus auratus (introduced), goldfish
- Carassius carassius (introduced), crucian carp
- Catla catla (native), bhakur, catla
- Chagunius chagunio (native), chaguni
- Chagunius nicholsi (native)
- Chela cachius (native), silver hatchet chela
- Chela dadiburjori (endemic), dadio
- Chela fasciata (endemic), Malabar hatchet chela
- Chela laubuca (native), winged danio, Indian glass barb
- Cirrhinus cirrhosus (native), mrigal
- Cirrhinus fulungee (endemic), Deccan white carp
- Cirrhinus macrops (endemic), Hora white carp
- Crossocheilus burmanicus (native)
- Crossocheilus diplochilus (native), Kashmir latia
- Crossocheilus latius (native), Gangetic latia
- Crossocheilus periyarensis (endemic)
- Ctenopharyngodon idella (introduced), grass carp
- Cyprinion semiplotum (native), Assamese kingfish
- Cyprinus carpio carpio (introduced), common carp
- Danio dangila (native), Dangila danio
- Danio rerio (native), anju, zebra danio
- Desmopuntius johorensis (questionable), melon barb, striped barb
- Devario acuticephala (endemic), Manipur danio
- Devario aequipinnatus (native), giant danio
- Devario assamensis (native)
- Devario devario (native), devario danio, Sind danio
- Devario fraseri (endemic), Fraser danio
- Devario horai (native)
- Devario malabaricus (native), Malabar danio
- Devario manipurensis (native)
- Devario naganensis (endemic), Naga danio
- Devario neilgherriensis (endemic), Peninsular danio
- Devario regina (native), Fowler's danio
- Devario yuensis (native)
- Diptychus maculatus (native), Tibetan snowtrout, scaly osman
- Eechathalakenda ophicephala (endemic), Channa barb
- Esomus barbatus (endemic), South Indian flying barb
- Esomus danricus (native), Indian flying barb
- Esomus lineatus (native), striped flying barb
- Esomus malabaricus (native)
- Esomus manipurensis (native)
- Esomus thermoicos (native)
- Garra annandalei (native), Annandale garra
- Garra bicornuta (endemic), Tunga garra
- Garra compressus (native)
- Garra elongata (native)
- Garra gotyla gotyla (native), Gadhera, sucker head
- Garra gotyla stenorhynchus (endemic), Nilgiris garra
- Garra hughi (endemic), Cardamon garra
- Garra kalakadensis (endemic)
- Garra kempi (native), Kemp garra
- Garra lamta (native), Gadhera
- Garra lissorhynchus (endemic), Khasi garra
- Garra litanensis (native)
- Garra manipurensis (native)
- Garra mcclellandi (endemic), Cauvery garra
- Garra menoni (endemic)
- Garra mullya (native), mullya garra
- Garra naganensis (endemic), Naga garra
- Garra nambulica (native)
- Garra nasuta (native), Khasi garra
- Garra notata (native), Tenasserim garra
- Garra paralissorhynchus (Manipur)
- Garra periyarensis (native)
- Garra rupecula (endemic), Mishmi garra
- Garra surendranathanii (native)
- Horadandia atukorali (native)
- Horalabiosa arunachalami (native)
- Horalabiosa joshuai (native)
- Horalabiosa palaniensis (native)
- Hypophthalmichthys molitrix (introduced), silver carp
- Hypselobarbus curmuca (endemic), curmuca barb
- Hypselobarbus dobsoni (endemic), Krishna carp
- Hypselobarbus dubius (endemic), Nilgiris barb
- Hypselobarbus jerdoni (endemic), Jerdon's carp
- Hypselobarbus kolus (endemic), kolus
- Hypselobarbus kurali (endemic)
- Hypselobarbus lithopidos (endemic), canara barb
- Hypselobarbus micropogon (endemic), korhi barb
- Hypselobarbus periyarensis (native)
- Hypselobarbus pulchellus (endemic)
- Hypselobarbus thomassi (endemic), red canarese barb
- Labeo angra (native), Angra labeo
- Labeo ariza (native), ariza labeo, Reba
- Labeo bata (native), bata labeo, bata
- Labeo boga (native), boga labeo
- Labeo boggut (native), boggut labeo
- Labeo caeruleus (questionable), Sind labeo
- Labeo calbasu (native), Karnataka labeo, orange-fin labeo
- Labeo dussumieri (native), thooli
- Labeo dyocheilus (native), boalla
- Labeo fimbriatus (native), fringed-lipped peninsula carp
- Labeo gonius (native), Kuria labeo
- Labeo kawrus (endemic), Deccan labeo
- Labeo kontius (endemic), pigmouth carp
- Labeo nandina (native)
- Labeo pangusia (native), pangusia labeo
- Labeo porcellus (native), Bombay labeo
- Labeo potail (endemic), Deccan labeo
- Labeo rajasthanicus (endemic)
- Labeo rohita (native), rohu
- Labeo udaipurensis (endemic)
- Lepidopygopsis typus (endemic), peninsular hilltrout
- Megarasbora elanga (native), Bengala barb
- Neolissochilus dukai (native)
- Neolissochilus hexagonolepis (native), katli, copper mahseer
- Neolissochilus hexastichus (native)
- Neolissochilus pnar (endemic)
- Neolissochilus spinulosus (endemic)
- Oreichthys cosuatis (native)
- Oreichthys umangii (native)
- Osteobrama alfredianus (native)
- Osteobrama bakeri (endemic), Malabar osteobrama
- Osteobrama belangeri (native), Manipur osteobrama
- Osteobrama bhimensis (endemic)
- Osteobrama cotio cotio (native), cotio
- Osteobrama cotio cunma (native), cunma osteobrama
- Osteobrama cotio peninsularis (endemic), peninsular osteobrama
- Osteobrama neilli (endemic), Nilgiri osteobrama
- Osteobrama vigorsii (endemic), Bheema osteobrama
- Osteochilichthys brevidorsalis (endemic), Kantaka barb
- Osteochilus hasseltii (native), silver sharkminnow
- Osteochilus longidorsalis (endemic)
- Osteochilus nashii (endemic), Chandkas barb, Nash's barb
- Osteochilus thomassi (endemic), Konti barb
- Parapsilorhynchus discophorus (endemic), ratnagiri minnow
- Parapsilorhynchus elongatus (native)
- Parapsilorhynchus prateri (endemic), Deolali minnow
- Parapsilorhynchus tentaculatus (endemic), Khandalla minnow
- Parluciosoma labiosa (endemic), slender rasbora
- Poropuntius burtoni (native)
- Poropuntius clavatus (native), Stedman barb
- Ptychobarbus conirostris (native), Indus snowtrout
- Puntius ambassis (native)
- Puntius amphibius (native), scarlet-banded barb
- Puntius arenatus (endemic), arenatus barb
- Puntius arulius (endemic), Silas barb, Arulius barb
- Puntius assimilis (native)
- Puntius bimaculatus (native), redside barb
- Puntius burmanicus (questionable)
- Puntius chalakkudiensis (endemic)
- Puntius chelynoides (native), dark mahseer
- Puntius chola (native), chola barb, swamp barb
- Pethia conchonius (native), red barb, rosy barb
- Puntius coorgensis (native)
- Puntius crescentus (native)
- Puntius deccanensis (endemic), Deccan barb
- Puntius denisonii (endemic), Denison barb
- Puntius dorsalis (native), Cauvery barb, long snouted barb
- Puntius exclamatio (native)
- Puntius fasciatus (endemic), melon barb
- Puntius filamentosus (native), black-spot barb, blackspot barb
- Puntius fraseri (endemic), dharna barb
- Pethia gelius (native), golden barb
- Puntius guganio (native), glass-barb
- Puntius kannikattiensis (native)
- Puntius mahecola (native)
- Puntius manipurensis (native)
- Puntius meingangbii (native)
- Puntius melanampyx (native)
- Puntius morehensis (native), waijabi
- Puntius mudumalaiensis (native)
- Puntius muvattupuzhaensis
- Puntius nangalensis (native)
- Puntius narayani (endemic), Narayan barb
- Puntius ornatus (native)
- Puntius orphoides (questionable), Javaen barb
- Puntius parrah (endemic), parrah barb
- Pethia phutunio (native), dwarf barb, spottedsail barb
- Puntius pleurotaenia (questionable), black lined barb
- Puntius punctatus (endemic)
- Puntius punjabensis (questionable)
- Puntius puntio (native), puntio barb
- Puntius roseipinnis (endemic), Pondicherry barb
- Puntius sahyadriensis (endemic), Khavli barb
- Puntius sarana (native), Peninsular olive barb, olive barb
- Pethia setnai (native)
- Puntius shalynius (endemic), Shalyni barb
- Puntius sharmai (endemic)
- Puntius sophore (native), spotfin swamp barb, Pool barb
- Puntius sophoroides (native)
- Puntius tambraparniei (endemic)
- Puntius terio (native), one-spot barb, onespot barb
- Puntius ticto (native), thunnus, ticto barb
- Puntius vittatus (native), kooli barb, greenstripe barb
- Puntius waageni (questionable)
- Puntius yuensis (native)
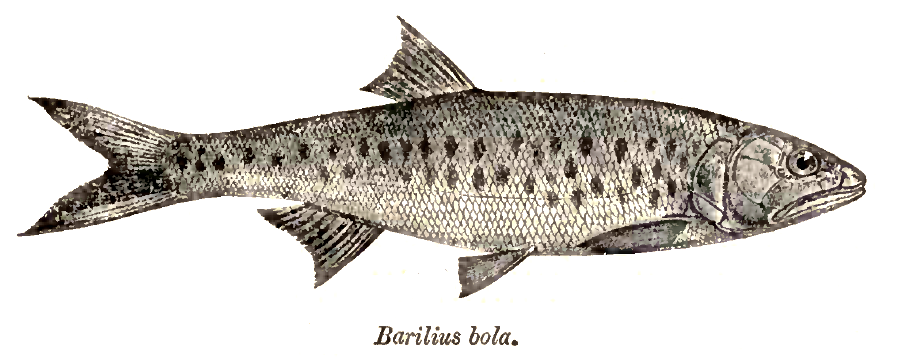
  Raiamas bola
- Raiamas bola (native), Indian trout, trout barb
- Raiamas guttatus (native), Burmese trout
- Rasbora caverii (endemic), Cauvery rasbora
- Rasbora daniconius (native), blackline rasbora, slender rasbora
- Rasbora rasbora (native), Gangetic scissortail rasbora
- Rasbora vaterifloris (questionable), pearly rasbora
- Rohtee ogilbii (endemic), Vatani rohtee
- Salmophasia balookee (native), Bloch razorbelly minnow
- Salmophasia punjabensis (native), Punjab razorbelly minnow
- Salmostoma acinaces (native), silver razorbelly minnow
- Salmostoma bacaila (native), large razorbelly minnow
- Salmostoma belachi (native), belachi
- Salmostoma boopis (endemic), boopis razorbelly minnow
- Salmostoma horai (endemic), Hora razorbelly minnow
- Salmostoma novacula (endemic), novacula razorbelly minnow
- Salmostoma orissaensis (endemic), Orissa razorbelly minnow
- Salmostoma phulo (native), finescale razorbelly minnow
- Salmostoma sardinella (native), sardinella razorbelly minnow
- Salmostoma untrahi (endemic), Mahanadi razorbelly minnow
- Schismatorhynchos nukta (endemic), Nukta
- Schizopyge curvifrons (native), Dapeghat snowtrout, Sattar snowtrout
- Schizopyge niger (native), alghad snowtrout, chush snowtrout
- Schizopygopsis stoliczkai (native), Kinnaur snowtrout, false osman
- Schizothorax esocinus (native), chirruh snowtrout
- Schizothorax huegelii (native)
- Schizothorax kumaonensis (endemic), Kumaon snowtrout
- Schizothorax labiatus (native), Kunar snowtrout
- Schizothorax microcephalus (native)
- Schizothorax molesworthi (native)
- Schizothorax nasus (native), Dongu snowtrout
- Schizothorax plagiostomus (native), asaila
- Schizothorax progastus (native), Dinnawah snowtrout
- Schizothorax richardsonii (native), asaila, snow trout
- Securicula gora (native), gora-chela
- Semiplotus manipurensis (native)
- Semiplotus modestus (native), Burmese kingfish
- Sinilabeo dero (native), Arangi, kalabans
- Thynnichthys sandkhol (endemic), sandkhol carp
- Tinca tinca (introduced), tench
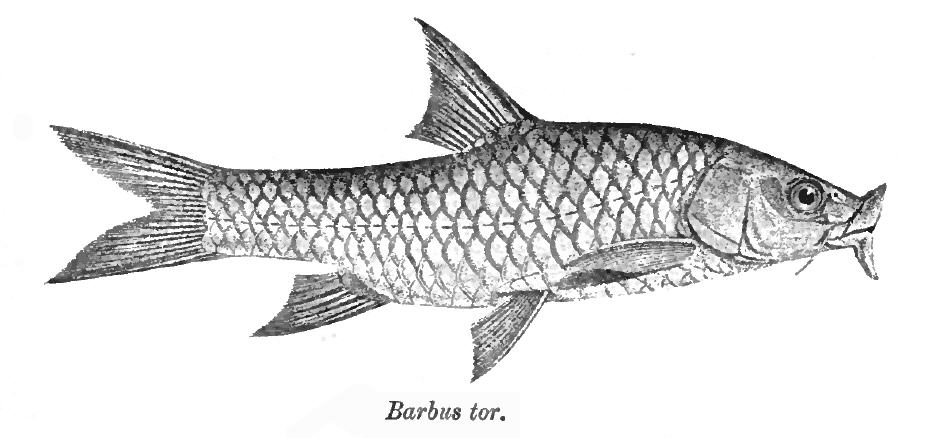
  Deccan mahseer, Tor khudree
- Tor khudree (native), Deccan mahseer
- Tor kulkarnii (native), dwarf mahseer
- Tor macrolepis (native)
- Tor mussullah (endemic), mussullah mahseer, humpback mahseer
- Tor progeneius (endemic), Jungha mahseer
- Tor putitora (native), chadu, golden mahseer
- Tor tor (native), tor mahseer, mahseer

=== Psilorhynchidae ===
- Psilorhynchus balitora (native), balitora minnow
- Psilorhynchus homaloptera (native), homaloptera minnow, torrent stone carp
- Psilorhynchus microphthalmus (native)
- Psilorhynchus sucatio (native), sucatio minnow, river stone carp

== Cyprinodontiformes ==
=== Aplocheilidae (killifishes) ===
- Aplocheilus blockii (native), green panchax
- Aplocheilus dayi (questionable), Day's panchax, Ceylon killifish
- Aplocheilus kirchmayeri (endemic)
- Aplocheilus lineatus (native), Malabar killie, striped panchax
- Aplocheilus panchax (native), blue panchax
- Aplocheilus parvus (native), dwarf panchax

=== Cyprinodontidae (pupfishes) ===
- Aphanius dispar dispar (native)

=== Poeciliidae (poeciliids) ===
- Gambusia affinis (introduced), mosquitofish
- Gambusia holbrooki (introduced), eastern mosquitofish
- Poecilia reticulata (introduced), Barbados millions, guppy
- Xiphophorus hellerii (introduced), green swordtail

== Elopiformes ==
=== Elopidae (tenpounders) ===
- Elops machnata (native), ladyfish, tenpounder

=== Megalopidae (tarpons) ===
- Megalops cyprinoides (native), oxeye tarpon, Indo-Pacific tarpon

== Gadiformes ==
=== Bregmacerotidae (codlets) ===
- Bregmaceros mcclellandi (native), spotted codlet

=== Macrouridae (grenadiers or rattails) ===
- Bathygadus furvescens (native)
- Coelorinchus flabellispinnis (native)
- Coelorinchus parallelus (native), spiny grenadier
- Coryphaenoides hextii (native)
- Coryphaenoides macrolophus (native)
- Coryphaenoides nasutus (questionable), largenose grenadier
- Coryphaenoides woodmasoni (native)
- Gadomus multifilis (native)
- Hymenocephalus italicus (native), glasshead grenadier
- Malacocephalus laevis (native), softhead grenadier
- Sphagemacrurus pumiliceps (native)

=== Moridae (morid cods) ===
- Physiculus argyropastus (native)

== Gasterosteiformes ==
=== Pegasidae (seamoths) ===
- Eurypegasus draconis (native), short dragonfish
- Pegasus laternarius (native)
- Pegasus volitans (native), longtail seamoth

=== Chanidae (milkfish) ===
- Chanos chanos (native), milkfish

== Hexanchiformes ==
=== Hexanchidae (cow sharks) ===
- Heptranchias perlo (native), sharpnose sevengill shark

== Lamniformes ==
=== Alopiidae (thresher sharks) ===
- Alopias pelagicus (native), pelagic thresher
- Alopias superciliosus (native), bigeye thresher
- Alopias vulpinus (native), thintail thresher

=== Lamnidae (mackerel sharks or white shark) ===
- Isurus oxyrinchus (native), shortfin shark, shortfin mako

=== Odontaspididae (sand tigers) ===
- Carcharias taurus (native), sand tiger shark
- Carcharias tricuspidatus (native), blue nurse sand-tiger, Indian sand tiger

== Lampriformes ==
=== Lophotidae (crestfishes) ===
- Eumecichthys fiski (native), unicorn crestfish

=== Veliferidae (velifers) ===
- Velifer hypselopterus (native), sailfin velifer

== Lophiiformes ==
=== Antennariidae (frogfishes) ===
- Antennarius coccineus (native), scarlet frogfish
- Antennarius hispidus (native), shaggy angler
- Antennarius indicus (native), Indian frogfish
- Antennarius nummifer (native), spotfin frogfish
- Antennarius pictus (native), painted frogfish
- Antennarius striatus (native), striated frogfish
- Histrio histrio (native), sargassum fish

=== Chaunacidae (sea toads) ===
- Chaunax pictus (native), pink frogmouth

=== Diceratiidae (double anglers) ===
- Diceratias bispinosus (native), two-rod anglerfish

=== Lophiidae (goosefishes) ===
- Lophiodes gracilimanus (native)
- Lophiodes mutilus (native), smooth angler
- Lophiomus setigerus (native), blackmouth angler

=== Ogcocephalidae (batfishes) ===
- Dibranchus nasutus (native)
- Halicmetus ruber (native)
- Halieutaea coccinea (native)
- Halieutaea indica (native), Indian handfish
- Halieutaea stellata (native), starry handfish

=== Oneirodidae (dreamers) ===
- Lophodolos indicus (native)

== Myctophiformes ==
=== Myctophidae (lanternfishes) ===
- Bolinichthys pyrsobolus (native)
- Centrobranchus andreae (native), Andre's lanternfish
- Diaphus luetkeni (native)
- Diaphus splendidus (native)
- Hygophum reinhardtii (native), Reinhardt's lantern fish
- Myctophum affine (questionable), metallic lantern fish
- Myctophum aurolaternatum (native), golden lanternfish
- Myctophum indicum (native)
- Myctophum spinosum (native), spiny lantern fish
- Symbolophorus evermanni (native), Evermann's lantern fish

=== Neoscopelidae ===
- Neoscopelus macrolepidotus (questionable), large-scaled lantern fish
- Scopelengys tristis (questionable), Pacific blackchin

== Notacanthiformes ==
=== Halosauridae (halosaurs) ===
- Aldrovandia affinis (native), Gilbert's halosaurid fish
- Aldrovandia mediorostris (native)
- Aldrovandia phalacra (native), Hawaiian halosaurid fish
- Halosaurus parvipennis (native)

== Ophidiiformes ==
=== Bythitidae (viviparous brotulas) ===
- Dinematichthys iluocoeteoides (native), yellow pigmy brotula

=== Carapidae (pearlfishes) ===
- Carapus boraborensis (native), pinhead pearlfish
- Carapus mourlani (native), star pearlfish
- Encheliophis gracilis (native), graceful pearlfish
- Encheliophis homei (native), silver pearlfish

=== Ophidiidae (cusk-eels) ===
- Bassozetus glutinosus (native)
- Brotula multibarbata (native), goatsbeard brotula
- Dicrolene introniger (questionable), digitate cusk eel
- Enchelybrotula paucidens (native)
- Glyptophidium argenteum (native)
- Holcomycteronus pterotus (native)
- Monomitopus conjugator (native)
- Monomitopus nigripinnis (native)
- Neobythites steatiticus (native)
- Porogadus trichiurus (native)
- Tauredophidium hextii (native)

== Orectolobiformes ==
=== Ginglymostomatidae (nurse sharks) ===
- Nebrius ferrugineus (native), giant sleepy shark, tawny nurse shark

=== Hemiscylliidae (bamboo sharks) ===
- Chiloscyllium arabicum (native), Arabian carpetshark
- Chiloscyllium griseum (native), grey bambooshark
- Chiloscyllium indicum (native), slender bambooshark
- Chiloscyllium plagiosum (native), whitespotted bambooshark
- Chiloscyllium punctatum (native), brownbanded bambooshark

=== Rhincodontidae (whale shark) ===
- Rhincodon typus (native), whale shark

=== Stegostomatidae (zebra sharks) ===
- Stegostoma fasciatum (native), zebra shark

== Osmeriformes ==
=== Alepocephalidae (slickheads) ===
- Aulastomatomorpha phospherops (native)
- Bathytroctes squamosus (questionable)
- Narcetes erimelas (native)

=== Platytroctidae (tubeshoulders) ===
- Platytroctes apus (native), legless searsid
- Platytroctes mirus (native), leaf searsid

== Osteoglossiformes ==
=== Notopteridae (featherbacks or knifefishes) ===
- chitala chitala (native), clown knifefish
- Notopterus notopterus (native), feather back, bronze featherback

== Perciformes ==
=== Acanthuridae (surgeonfishes, tangs, unicornfishes) ===
- Acanthurus gahhm (questionable), black surgeonfish
- Acanthurus leucosternon (native), powderblue surgeonfish
- Acanthurus lineatus (native), blue linned surgeonfish, lined surgeonfish
- Acanthurus mata (native), elongate surgeonfish
- Acanthurus nigricans (native), whitecheek surgeonfish
- Acanthurus nigrofuscus (native), brown surgeonfish
- Acanthurus nigroris (native), bluelined surgeonfish
- Acanthurus pyroferus (native), chocolate surgeonfish
- Acanthurus tennentii (native), doubleband surgeonfish
- Acanthurus thompsoni (native), Thompson's surgeonfish
- Acanthurus triostegus (native), convict surgeonfish
- Acanthurus xanthopterus (native), yellowfin surgeonfish
- Ctenochaetus striatus (native), striated surgeonfish
- Ctenochaetus strigosus (questionable), spotted surgeonfish
- Ctenochaetus truncatus (native)
- Naso brachycentron (native), humpback unicornfish
- Naso brevirostris (native), spotted unicornfish
- Naso lituratus (misidentification), orangespine unicornfish
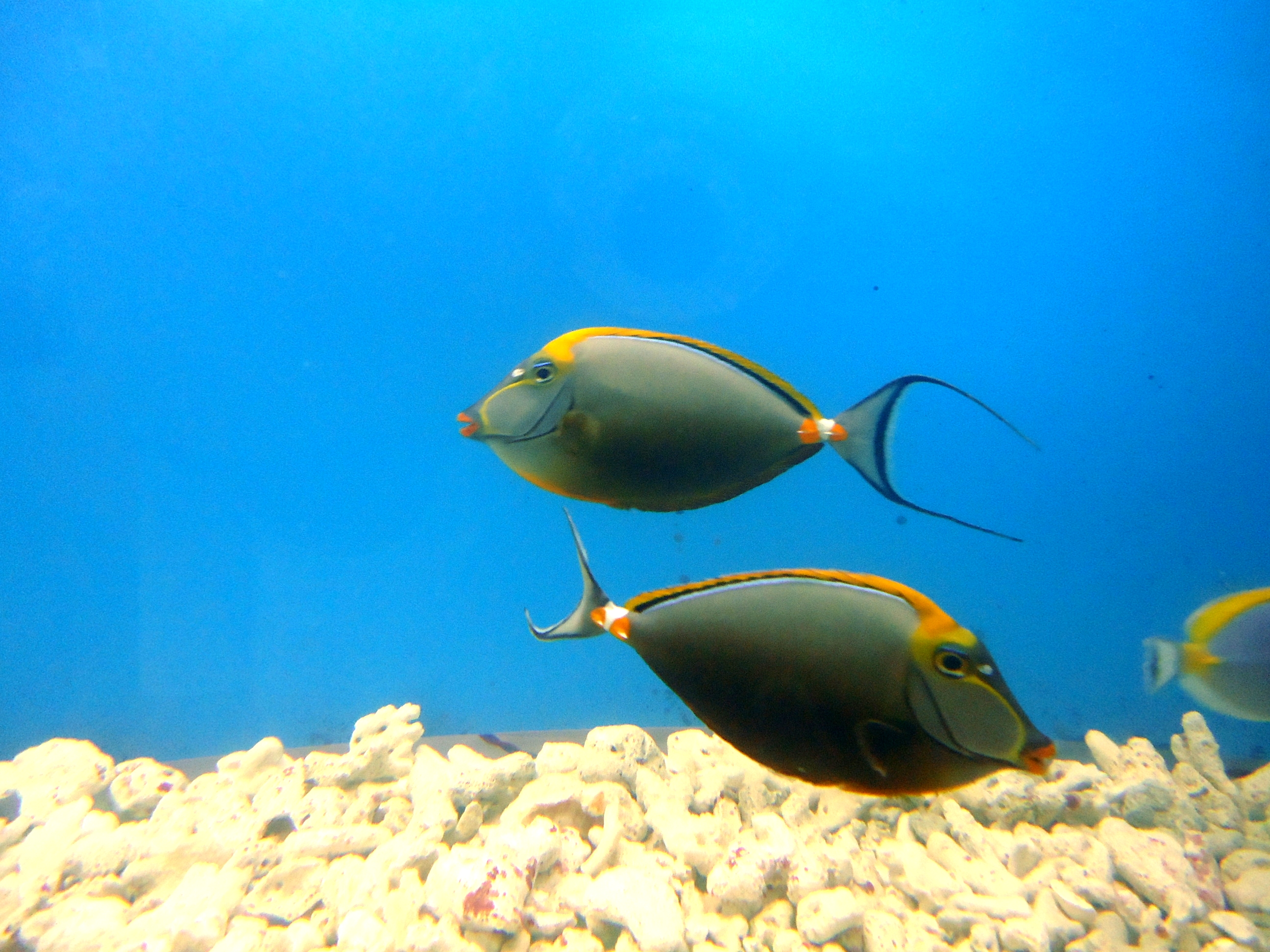
  Naso lituratus in an aquarium
- Naso tonganus (native), bulbnose unicornfish
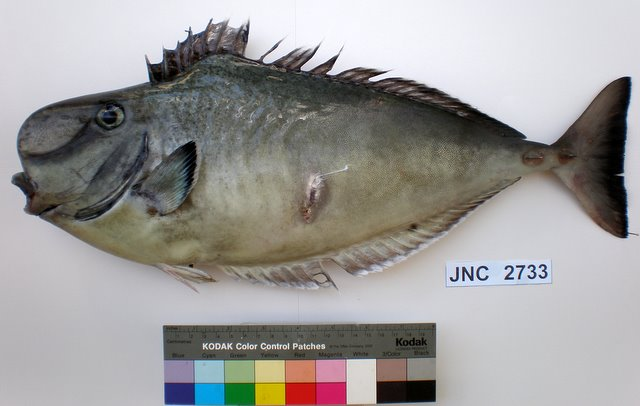
  Naso tonganus
- Naso tuberosus (native), humpnose unicornfish
- Naso unicornis (native), bluespine unicornfish
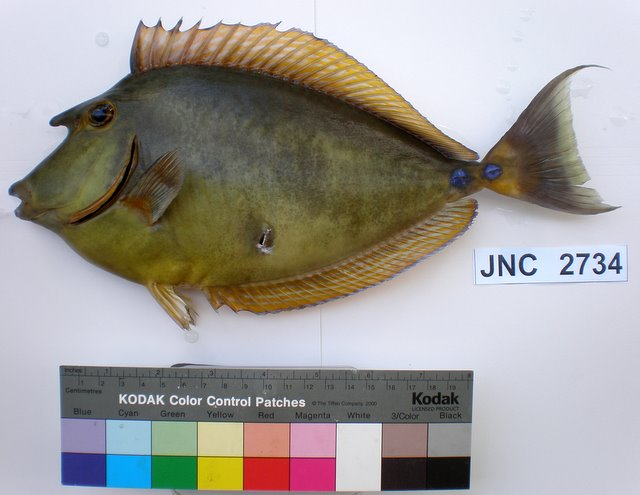
  Naso unicornis
- Naso vlamingii (native), bignose unicornfish
- Paracanthurus hepatus (native), palette surgeonfish
- Zebrasoma flavescens (questionable), yellow tang
- Zebrasoma veliferum (misidentification), sailfin tang
- Zebrasoma xanthurum (native), yellowtail tang

=== Acropomatidae (lanternbellies, temperate ocean-basses) ===
- Acropoma japonicum (native), glowbelly
- Synagrops philippinensis (native)

=== Ambassidae (Asiatic glassfishes) ===
- Ambassis ambassis (native), Commerson's glassy perchlet, Commerson's glassy
- Ambassis buton (native), buton glassy perchlet
- Ambassis dussumieri (native), Malabar glassy perchlet
- Ambassis gymnocephalus (native), bald glassy perchlet, bald glassy
- Ambassis interrupta (native), interrupta glassy perchlet, long-spined glass perchlet
- Ambassis kopsii (native), Singapore glassy perchlet, freckled hawkfish
- Ambassis macracanthus (native), estuarine glass perchlet
- Ambassis miops (native), myops glassy perchlet, flag-tailed glass perchlet
- Ambassis nalua (native), Nalua-chanda, scalloped perchlet
- Ambassis urotaenia (native), banded-tail glassy perchlet
- Chanda nama (native), elongate glass-perchlet
- Parambassis dayi (endemic), Day's glass fish, Day's glassy perchlet
- Parambassis lala (native), highfin glassy perchlet
- Parambassis ranga (native), Indian glassy fish
- Parambassis thomassi (endemic), Western Ghats glassy perchlet
- Pseudambassis baculis (native), Himalayan glassy perchlet

=== Ammodytidae (sand lances) ===
- Bleekeria kallolepis (native)

=== Anabantidae (climbing gouramies) ===
- Anabas cobojius (native), Gangetic koi
- Anabas testudineus (native), climbing perch

=== Apogonidae (cardinalfishes) ===
- Apogon apogonoides (native), short-tooth cardinal
- Apogon coccineus (native), ruby cardinalfish
- Apogon endekataenia (questionable), candystripe cardinalfish
- Apogon fasciatus (native), broad-banded cardinalfish
- Apogon fleurieu (native), cardinalfish
- Apogon fraenatus (native), bridled cardinalfish
- Apogon guamensis (native), Guam cardinalfish
- Apogon holotaenia (native), copperstriped cardinalfish
- Apogon kallopterus (native), iridescent cardinalfish
- Apogon leptacanthus (native), threadfin cardinalfish
- Apogon moluccensis (native), Moluccan cardinalfish
- Apogon novemfasciatus (questionable), sevenstriped cardinalfish
- Apogon oxina (native)
- Apogon poecilopterus (native), pearly-finned cardinalfish
- Apogon quadrifasciatus (native), twostripe cardinal
- Apogon sangiensis (native), Sangi cardinalfish
- Apogon savayensis (native), Samoan cardinalfish
- Apogon taeniatus (questionable), twobelt cardinal
- Apogon taeniophorus (native), reef-flat cardinalfish
- Apogonichthys ocellatus (native), ocellated cardinalfish
- Archamia bleekeri (native)
- Archamia fucata (native), orangelined cardinalfish
- Cheilodipterus arabicus (native), tiger cardinal
- Cheilodipterus lachneri (questionable)
- Cheilodipterus quinquelineatus (native), five-lined cardinalfish
- Foa brachygramma (native), weed cardinalfish
- Fowleria aurita (native), crosseyed cardinalfish
- Gymnapogon africanus (questionable), crystal cardinal
- Pseudamia gelatinosa (native), gelatinous cardinalfish
- Rhabdamia cypselura (native), swallowtail cardinalfish
- Rhabdamia gracilis (native), luminous cardinalfish

=== Ariommatidae (Ariommatids) ===
- Ariomma indica (native), Indian ariomma

=== Badidae ===
- Badis assamensis (native)
- Badis badis (native), blue perch
- Badis blosyrus (native)
- Badis britzi (native)
- Badis kanabos (native)
- Badis tuivaiei (native)
- Dario dario (native), scarlet badis

=== Bathyclupeidae ===
- Bathyclupea hoskynii (native)

=== Blenniidae (combtooth blennies) ===
- Alticus kirkii (native), Kirk's blenny
- Andamia reyi (native), suckerlip blenny
- Antennablennius bifilum (native), horned rockskipper
- Aspidontus tractus (native)
- Blenniella leopardus (native)
- Blenniella periophthalmus (native), blue-dashed rockskipper
- Cirripectes castaneus (native), chestnut eyelash-blenny
- Cirripectes filamentosus (native), filamentous blenny
- Cirripectes perustus (native), flaming blenny
- Cirripectes polyzona (native)
- Cirripectes quagga (native), squiggly blenny
- Cirripectes stigmaticus (native), red-streaked blenny
- Cirripectes variolosus (questionable), red-speckled blenny
- Ecsenius midas (native), Persian blenny
- Ecsenius pulcher (native)
- Enchelyurus kraussii (native), Krauss' blenny
- Entomacrodus striatus (native), reef margin blenny
- Entomacrodus vermiculatus (native), vermiculated blenny
- Exallias brevis (native), leopard blenny
- Haptogenys bipunctata (native)
- Hirculops cornifer (native), highbrow rockskipper
- Istiblennius dussumieri (native), streaky rockskipper
- Istiblennius edentulus (native), rippled rockskipper
- Istiblennius lineatus (native), lined rockskipper
- Istiblennius spilotus (native), spotted rockskipper
- Meiacanthus smithi (native), disco blenny
- Mimoblennius atrocinctus (native)
- Omobranchus elongatus (native), cloister blenny
- Omobranchus fasciolatus (native), Arab blenny
- Omobranchus ferox (native), gossamer blenny
- Omobranchus obliquus (native)
- Omobranchus punctatus (native), muzzled blenny
- Omobranchus zebra (native), zebra blenny
- Parablennius thysanius (native), tasseled blenny
- Petroscirtes breviceps (native), striped poison-fang blenny mimic
- Petroscirtes mitratus (native), floral blenny
- Petroscirtes xestus (native), xestus sabretooth blenny
- Plagiotremus rhinorhynchos (native), bluestriped fangblenny
- Plagiotremus tapeinosoma (native), mimic blenny, piano fangblenny
- Salarias fasciatus (native), jewelled blenny
- Salarias reticulatus (sp. nov.)
- Scartella emarginata (native), maned blenny
- Xiphasia setifer (native), hairtail blenny

=== Caesionidae (fusiliers) ===
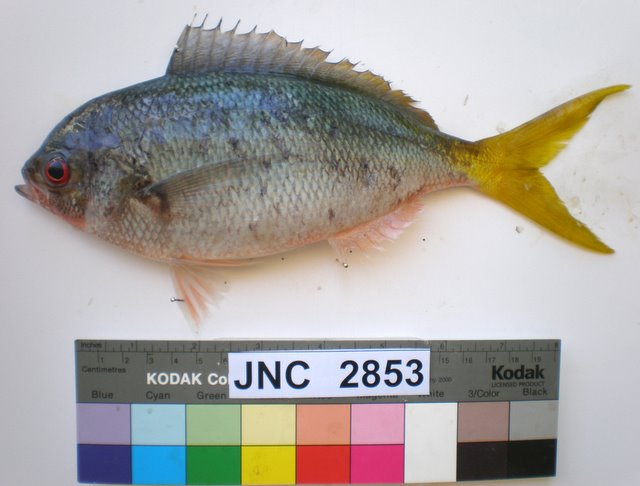
Caesio cuning

- Caesio caerulaurea (native), blue and gold fusilier
- Caesio cuning (native), redbelly yellowtail fusilier
- Caesio lunaris (native), lunar fusilier
- Caesio teres (native), yellow and blueback fusilier
- Caesio varilineata (native), variable-lined fusilier
- Caesio xanthonota (native), yellowback fusilier
- Dipterygonotus balteatus (native), mottled fusilier
- Gymnocaesio gymnoptera (native), slender fusilier
- Pterocaesio chrysozona (native), goldband fusilier
- Pterocaesio digramma (questionable), double-lined fusilier
- Pterocaesio pisang (native), banana fusilier
- Pterocaesio tessellata (native), one-stripe fusilier
- Pterocaesio tile (native), dark-banded fusilier

=== Callionymidae (dragonets) ===
- Bathycallionymus kaianus (native)
- Callionymus carebares (native), Indian deepwater dragonet
- Callionymus erythraeus (native), smallhead dragonet
- Callionymus fluviatilis (native), river dragonet
- Callionymus japonicus (questionable)
- Callionymus kotthausi (native)
- Callionymus margaretae (native), Margaret's dragonet
- Callionymus megastomus (native)
- Callionymus sagitta (native), arrow headed dragonet, arrow dragonet
- Eleutherochir opercularis (native), Indian dragonet, flap-gilled dragonet

=== Carangidae (jacks and pompanos) ===
- Alectis ciliaris (native), African pompano
- Alectis indicus (native), Indian threadfish
- Alepes djedaba (native), shrimp scad
- Alepes kleinii (native), razorbelly scad
- Alepes melanoptera (native), blackfin scad
- Alepes vari (native), herring scad
- Atropus atropos (native), cleftbelly trevally
- Atule mate (native), yellowtail scad
- Carangoides armatus (native), longfin trevally
- Carangoides chrysophrys (native), longnose trevally
- Carangoides ciliarius (questionable)
- Carangoides coeruleopinnatus (native), coastal trevally
- Carangoides dinema (native), shadow trevally
- Carangoides ferdau (native), blue trevally
- Carangoides fulvoguttatus (native), yellowspotted trevally
- Carangoides gymnostethus (native), bludger
- Carangoides hedlandensis (native), bumpnose trevally
- Carangoides humerosus (native), duskyshoulder trevally
- Carangoides malabaricus (native), Malabar trevally
- Carangoides oblongus (native), coachwhip trevally
- Carangoides orthogrammus (native), island trevally
- Carangoides plagiotaenia (native), barcheek trevally
- Carangoides praeustus (native), brown-backed trevally, brownback trevally
- Carangoides talamparoides (native), impostor trevally
- Caranx heberi (native), blacktip trevally
- Caranx hippos (questionable), blacktailed trevally, crevalle jack
- Caranx ignobilis (native), giant kingfish, giant trevally
- Caranx lugubris (native), black jack
- Caranx melampygus (native), bluefin trevally
- Caranx papuensis (native), brassy trevally
- Caranx sexfasciatus (native), bigeye trevally
- Caranx tille (native), tille trevally
- Decapterus macarellus (native), mackerel scad
- Decapterus macrosoma (native), shortfin scad
- Decapterus russelli (native), Indian scad
- Elagatis bipinnulata (native), rainbow runner
- Gnathanodon speciosus (native), golden trevally
- Megalaspis cordyla (native), torpedo scad
- Naucrates ductor (native), pilotfish
- Parastromateus niger (native), brown pomfret, black pomfret
- Scomberoides commersonnianus (native), Talang queenfish
- Scomberoides lysan (native), double-spotted queenfish, doublespotted queenfish
- Scomberoides tala (native), barred queenfish
- Scomberoides tol (native), needlescaled queenfish
- Selar boops (native), oxeye scad
- Selar crumenophthalmus (native), bigeye scad
- Selaroides leptolepis (native), yellowstripe scad
- Seriola lalandi (native), yellowtail amberjack
- Seriola rivoliana (native), almaco jack
- Seriolina nigrofasciata (native), blackbanded trevally
- Trachinotus baillonii (native), smallspotted dart
- Trachinotus blochii (native), snubnose pompano
- Trachinotus botla (native), largespotted dart
- Trachinotus mookalee (native), Indian pompano
- Ulua mentalis (native), longrakered trevally
- Uraspis helvola (native), whitemouth jack
- Uraspis secunda (native), cottonmouth jack
- Uraspis uraspis (native), whitetongue jack

=== Centrogenyidae ===
- Centrogenys vaigiensis (native), false scorpionfish

=== Centrolophidae (medusafishes) ===
- Psenopsis cyanea (native), Indian ruff

=== Cepolidae (bandfishes) ===
- Acanthocepola indica (native)

=== Chaetodontidae (butterflyfishes) ===
- Chaetodon andamanensis (native)
- Chaetodon auriga (native), threadfin butterflyfish
- Chaetodon bennetti (native), bluelashed butterflyfish
- Chaetodon citrinellus (native), speckled butterflyfish
- Chaetodon collare (native), redtail butterflyfish
- Chaetodon decussatus (native), Indian vagabond butterflyfish
- Chaetodon falcula (native), blackwedged butterflyfish
- Chaetodon kleinii (native), sunburst butterflyfish
- Chaetodon lunula (native), raccoon butterflyfish
- Chaetodon melannotus (native), blackback butterflyfish
- Chaetodon meyeri (native), scrawled butterflyfish
- Chaetodon octofasciatus (native), eightband butterflyfish
- Chaetodon punctatofasciatus (questionable), spotband butterflyfish
- Chaetodon speculum (native), mirror butterflyfish
- Chaetodon trifascialis (native), chevron butterflyfish
- Chaetodon trifasciatus (native), melon butterflyfish
- Chaetodon vagabundus (native), vagabond butterflyfish
- Chaetodon xanthocephalus (native), yellowhead butterflyfish
- Chelmon rostratus (native), copperband butterflyfish
- Forcipiger longirostris (native), longnose butterflyfish
- Hemitaurichthys zoster (native), brown-and-white butterflyfish
- Heniochus acuminatus (native), pennant coral fish, Pennant coralfish
- Heniochus chrysostomus (native), threeband pennantfish
- Heniochus monoceros (native), masked bannerfish
- Heniochus pleurotaenia (native), phantom bannerfish
- Heniochus singularius (native), singular bannerfish
- Parachaetodon ocellatus (native), sixspine butterflyfish

=== Champsodontidae ===
- Champsodon capensis (questionable), gaper
- Champsodon vorax (questionable)

=== Channidae (snakeheads) ===
- Channa amphibeus (native), Borna snakehead
- Channa barca (native), barca snakehead
- Channa bleheri (native)
- Channa diplogramma (native)
- Channa gachua (native), bothua
- Channa marulius (native), bullseye snakehead, great snakehead
- Channa micropeltes (misidentification), Malabar snakehead, giant snakehead
- Channa orientalis (native), Asiatic snakehead, walking snakehead
- Channa punctata (native), spotted snakehead
- Channa stewartii (native), Assamese snakehead
- Channa striata (native), banded snakehead, snakehead murrel

=== Cichlidae (cichlids) ===
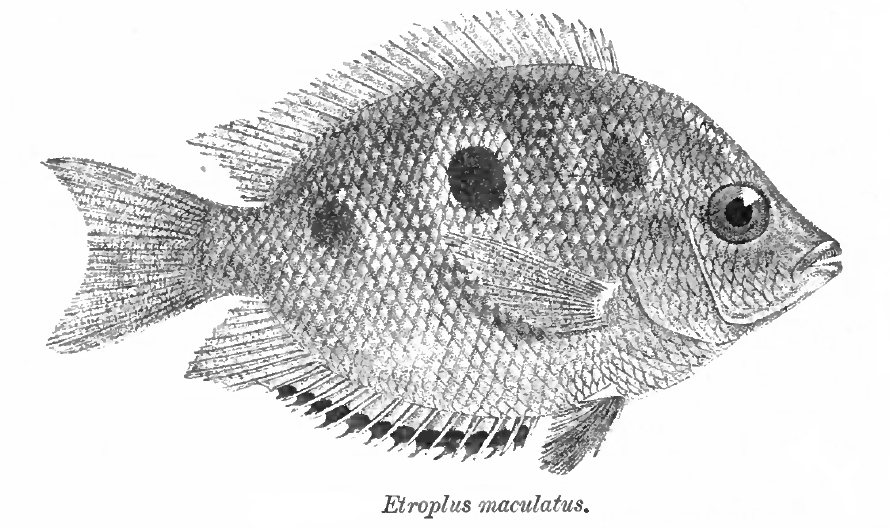
Orange chromide, Etroplus maculatus

- Etroplus canarensis (endemic), canara pearlspot
- Etroplus maculatus (native), orange chromide
- Etroplus suratensis (native), green chromide
- Oreochromis mossambicus (introduced), Mozambique cichlid, Mozambique tilapia
- Oreochromis niloticus niloticus (introduced), Nile tilapia

=== Cirrhitidae (hawkfishes) ===
- Cirrhitichthys aureus (native), yellow hawkfish
- Cirrhitichthys bleekeri (native)
- Cirrhitus pinnulatus (native), stocky hawkfish
- Paracirrhites forsteri (native), blackside hawkfish

=== Coryphaenidae (dolphinfishes) ===
- Coryphaena equiselis (native), pompano dolphinfish
- Coryphaena hippurus (native), common dolphinfish

=== Creediidae (sandburrowers) ===
- Chalixodytes tauensis (questionable), saddled sandburrower

=== Datnioididae ===
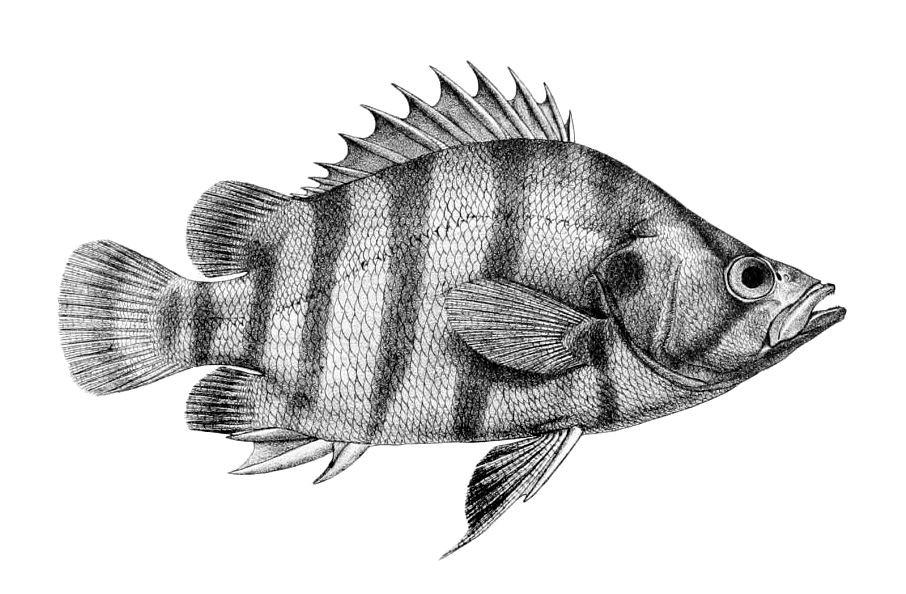
Datnioides polota

- Datnioides polota (native), four-barred tigerfish

=== Drepaneidae (sicklefishes) ===
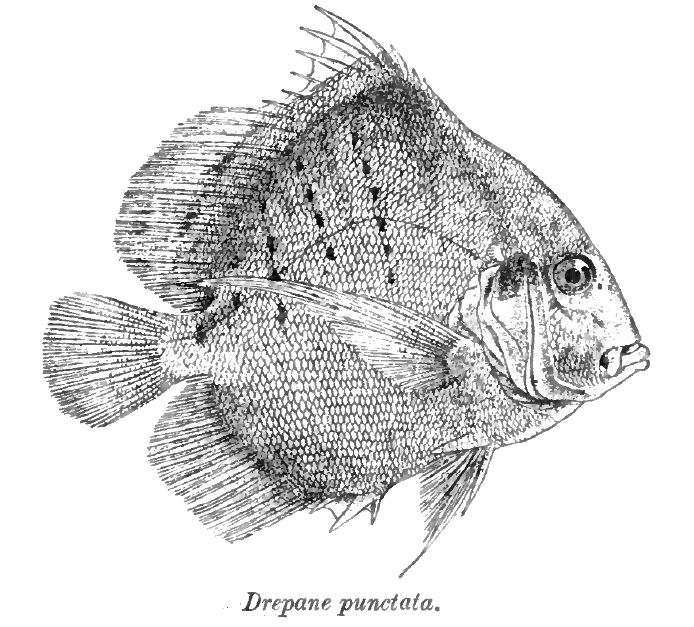
Drepane punctata

- Drepane longimana (native), concertina fish
- Drepane punctata (native), spotted sicklefish

=== Echeneidae (remoras) ===
- Echeneis naucrates (native), live sharksucker
- Phtheirichthys lineatus (native), slender suckerfish
- Remora osteochir (native), marlin sucker
- Remora remora (native), common remora
- Remorina albescens (native), white suckerfish

=== Eleotridae (sleepers) ===
- Bostrychus sinensis (native), four-eyed sleeper
- Butis amboinensis (native), olive flathead-gudgeon
- Butis butis (native), duckbill sleeper, duckbill sleeper
- Butis gymnopomus (native)
- Butis koilomatodon (native), mud sleeper
- Butis melanostigma (native), blackspot sleeper, black-spotted gudgeon
- Eleotris fusca (native), dusky sleeper, dusky sleeper
- Eleotris lutea (native), lutea sleeper
- Eleotris melanosoma (native), broadhead sleeper
- Incara multisquamatus (native), incara
- Odonteleotris macrodon (native), Gangetic sleeper
- Ophieleotris aporos (native), aporos sleeper, snakehead gudgeon
- Ophiocara porocephala (native), flathead sleeper, northern mud gudgeon

=== Emmelichthyidae (rovers) ===
- Erythrocles acarina (native)

=== Ephippidae (spadefishes, batfishes and scats) ===
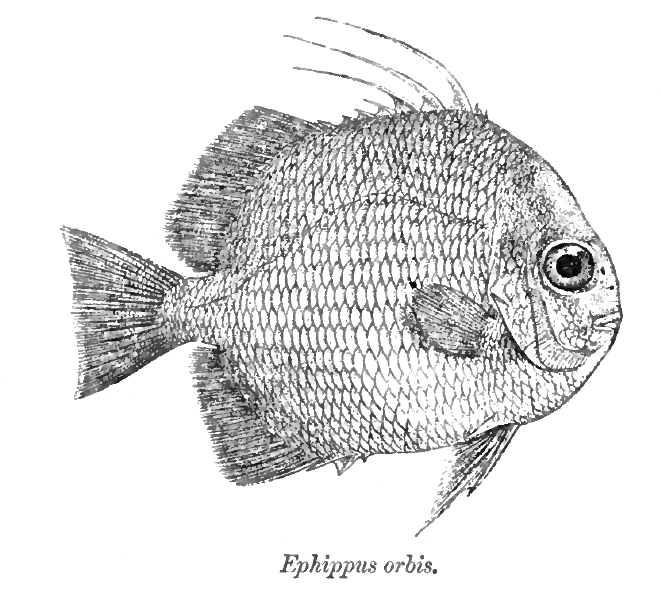
Ephippus orbis

- Ephippus orbis (native), orbfish
- Platax pinnatus (questionable), dusky batfish
- Platax teira (native), teira batfish
- Tripterodon orbis (questionable), African spadefish

=== Gempylidae (snake mackerels) ===
- Epinnula magistralis (native), domine
- Gempylus serpens (native), snake mackerel
- Lepidocybium flavobrunneum (native), escolar
- Nealotus tripes (native), black snake mackerel
- Neoepinnula orientalis (native), sackfish
- Promethichthys prometheus (native), Roudi escolar
- Rexea bengalensis (native), Bengal escolar
- Rexea prometheoides (native), royal escolar
- Ruvettus pretiosus (native), oilfish
- Thyrsitoides marleyi (native), black snoek

=== Gerreidae (mojarras) ===
- Gerres erythrourus (native), deep-bodied mojarra
- Gerres filamentosus (native), whiptail silver-biddy, whipfin silverbiddy
- Gerres limbatus (native), saddleback silver-biddy
- Gerres longirostris (native), strongspine silver-biddy, longtail silverbiddy
- Gerres macracanthus (native)
- Gerres oblongus (native), slender silverbiddy
- Gerres oyena (native), common silvery-biddy, common silver-biddy
- Gerres phaiya (native), phaiya, strong spined silver-biddy
- Gerres setifer (native), small Bengal silver-biddy, small Bengal silver-biddy
- Pentaprion longimanus (native), longfin mojarra

=== Gobiidae (gobies) ===
- Acentrogobius bontii (native)
- Acentrogobius caninus (native), tropical sand goby
- Acentrogobius cyanomos (native)
- Acentrogobius ennorensis (native)
- Acentrogobius griseus (endemic), grey goby
- Acentrogobius masoni (native)
- Acentrogobius viridipunctatus (native), spotted green goby
- Amblyeleotris gymnocephala (native), masked shrimpgoby
- Amblygobius albimaculatus (native), butterfly goby
- Amblyotrypauchen arctocephalus (native)
- Amoya madraspatensis (native)
- Apocryptes bato (native)
- Apocryptodon madurensis (native)
- Asterropteryx semipunctata (native), starry goby
- Awaous grammepomus (native), scribbled goby
- Awaous guamensis (native)
- Awaous melanocephalus (native), largesnout goby
- Awaous ocellaris (native)
- Bathygobius cyclopterus (native), spotted frillgoby
- Bathygobius fuscus (native), frill goby, dusky frillgoby
- Bathygobius niger (native), black minigoby
- Bathygobius ostreicola (endemic)
- Bathygobius petrophilus (questionable)
- Bathygobius smithi (native)
- Boleophthalmus boddarti (native), Boddart's goggle-eyed goby
- Boleophthalmus dussumieri (native)
- Boleophthalmus pectinirostris (questionable)
- Brachyamblyopus brachysoma (native)
- Brachygobius nunus (native), bumblebee goby
- Callogobius hasseltii (native), Hasselt's goby
- Callogobius seshaiyai (endemic)
- Caragobius urolepis (native), Sumatra eelgoby, scaleless worm goby
- Chiramenu fluviatilis (native)
- Ctenogobiops crocineus (native), silverspot shrimpgoby
- Ctenotrypauchen microcephalus (native), comb goby
- Drombus globiceps (native), bighead goby
- Egglestonichthys melanoptera (native)
- Eugnathogobius oligactis (native)
- Eviota distigma (native), twospot pygmy goby
- Exyrias puntang (native), puntang goby
- Favonigobius reichei (native), tropical sand goby, Indo-Pacific tropical sand goby
- Fusigobius neophytus (native), common fusegoby
- Glossogobius giuris (native), tank goby
- Glossogobius kokius (native)
- Glossogobius mas (native)
- Gnatholepis cauerensis cauerensis (native), eyebar goby
- Gobiodon citrinus (native), poison goby
- Gobiodon rivulatus (native), rippled coral goby
- Gobiopsis canalis (native), checkered goby
- Gobiopsis macrostoma (native), longjaw goby
- Gobiopsis woodsi (native)
- Gobiopterus chuno (native), glass goby
- Hemigobius hoevenii (questionable)
- Hetereleotris zonata (native), goggles
- Istigobius diadema (native)
- Istigobius ornatus (native), ornate goby
- Istigobius perspicillatus (native)
- Istigobius spence (native), pearl goby
- Mahidolia mystacina (native), smiling goby, flagfin prawn goby
- Obliquogobius cometes (native)
- Odontamblyopus roseus (native)
- Odontamblyopus rubicundus (native), rubicundus eelgoby
- Oligolepis acutipennis (native), sharptail goby
- Oligolepis cylindriceps (native)
- Oxuderces dentatus (native)
- Oxyurichthys dasi (native)
- Oxyurichthys formosanus (native)
- Oxyurichthys microlepis (native), maned goby
- Oxyurichthys ophthalmonema (native), eyebrow goby
- Oxyurichthys paulae (native), jester goby
- Oxyurichthys tentacularis (native)
- Parachaeturichthys ocellatus (native)
- Parachaeturichthys polynema (native), taileyed goby
- Paragobiodon echinocephalus (native), redhead goby
- Parapocryptes rictuosus (native)
- Parapocryptes serperaster (native)
- Periophthalmodon schlosseri (native), giant mudskipper
- Periophthalmodon septemradiatus (native)
- Periophthalmus argentilineatus (native), barred mudskipper
- Periophthalmus barbarus (questionable), Atlantic mudskipper
- Periophthalmus chrysospilos (native)
- Periophthalmus minutus (native)
- Periophthalmus novemradiatus (native), Pearse's mudskipper
- Periophthalmus waltoni (questionable), Walton's mudskipper
- Periophthalmus weberi (questionable), Weber's mudskipper
- Pleurosicya bilobata (native), bilobed ghost goby
- Priolepis eugenius (native), noble goby
- Priolepis inhaca (native), brick goby
- Psammogobius biocellatus (native), sleepy goby
- Pseudapocryptes elongatus (native)
- Pseudogobius javanicus (native)
- Pseudogobius melanostictus (native)
- Pseudogobius poicilosoma (native)
- Pseudotrypauchen multiradiatus (native)
- Scartelaos cantoris (native)
- Scartelaos histophorus (native), walking goby
- Scartelaos tenuis (questionable), Indian Ocean slender mudskipper
- Schismatogobius deraniyagalai (native), redneck goby
- Sicyopterus griseus (native)
- Sicyopterus microcephalus (native)
- Silhouettea indica (native)
- Stenogobius gymnopomus (native)
- Stenogobius laterisquamatus (questionable)
- Stigmatogobius minima (native)
- Stigmatogobius sadanundio (native)
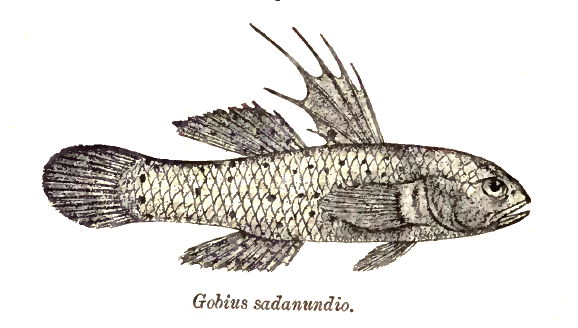
  Stigmatogobius sadanundio
- Taenioides anguillaris (native), Anguilla eelgoby, eel worm goby
- Taenioides buchanani (native), Burmese gobyeel
- Taenioides cirratus (native), Hooghly gobyeel, bearded worm goby
- Taenioides gracilis (native), slender eel goby
- Trimma annosum (native), greybearded pygmy goby
- Trypauchen vagina (native), burrowing goby
- Trypauchenichthys sumatrensis (native)
- Valenciennea muralis (native), mural goby
- Valenciennea sexguttata (native), sixspot goby
- Valenciennea strigata (native), blueband goby
- Yongeichthys criniger (native)
- Yongeichthys tuticorinensis (native)

=== Haemulidae (grunts) ===
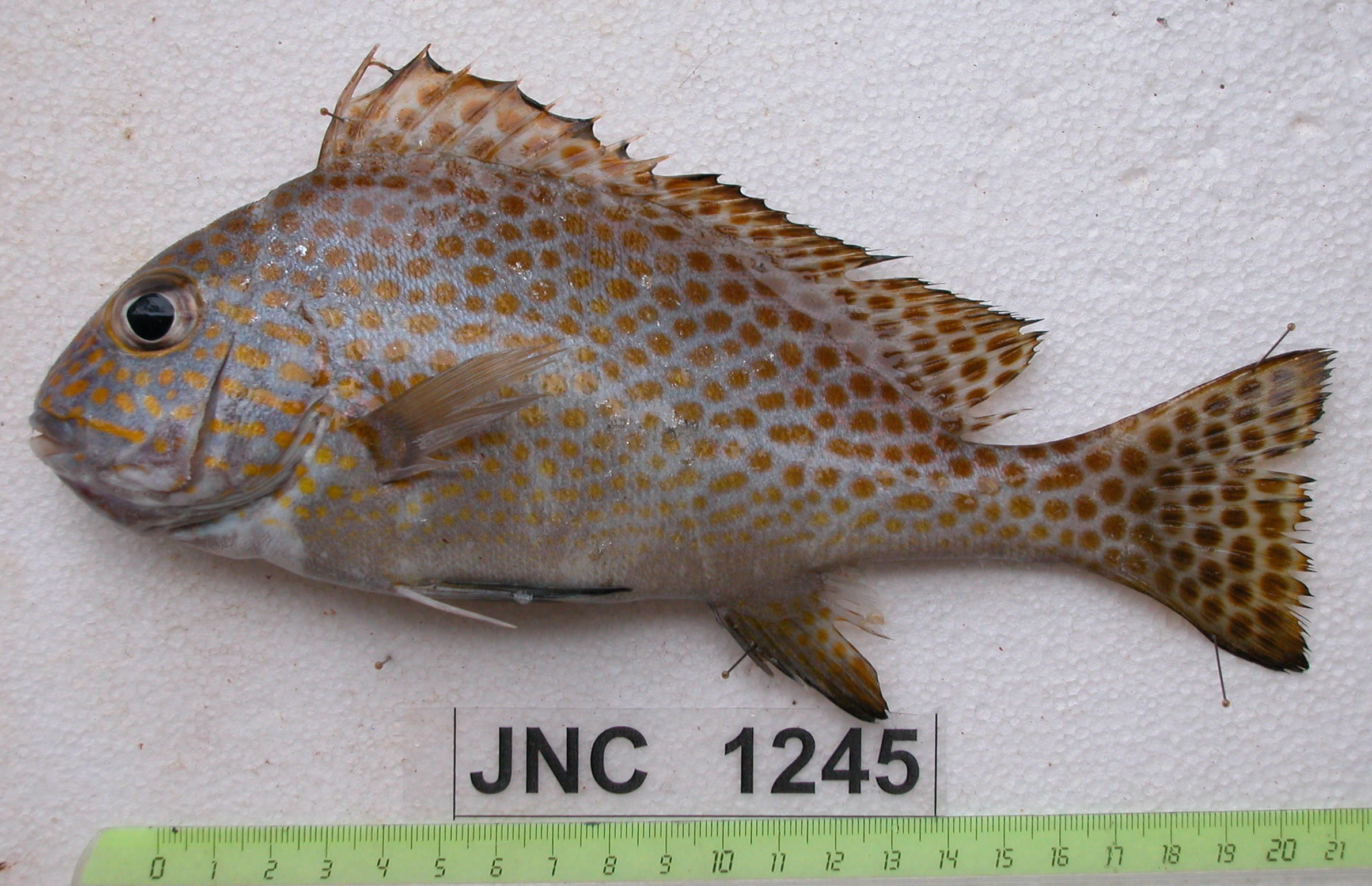
Diagramma pictum

- Diagramma pictum (native), painted sweetlips
- Plectorhinchus albovittatus (native), two-striped sweetlips
- Plectorhinchus ceylonensis (questionable), Sri Lanka sweetlips
- Plectorhinchus chubbi (native), dusky rubberlip
- Plectorhinchus diagrammus (questionable), striped sweetlips
- Plectorhinchus gibbosus (native), Harry hotlips
- Plectorhinchus lineatus (native), yellowbanded sweetlips
- Plectorhinchus nigrus (native)
- Plectorhinchus orientalis (native), oriental sweetlips
- Plectorhinchus picus (native), painted sweetlip
- Plectorhinchus polytaenia (native), ribboned sweetlips
- Plectorhinchus schotaf (native), minstrel sweetlip
- Pomadasys argenteus (native), silver grunt, silver grunt
- Pomadasys argyreus (native), bluecheek silver grunt
- Pomadasys commersonnii (native), spotted grunter, smallspotted grunter
- Pomadasys furcatus (native), banded grunter
- Pomadasys guoraca (native)
- Pomadasys hasta (native)
- Pomadasys kaakan (native), javelin grunter
- Pomadasys maculatus (native), saddle grunt
- Pomadasys multimaculatum (native), cock grunter
- Pomadasys olivaceus (native), olive grunt
- Pomadasys stridens (native), striped piggy

=== Istiophoridae (billfishes) ===
- Istiophorus platypterus (native), sailfish, Indo-Pacific sailfish
- Makaira indica (native), short nosed sword fish, black marlin
- Makaira mazara (native), Indo-Pacific blue marlin
- Makaira nigricans (questionable), Atlantic blue marlin
- Tetrapturus angustirostris (native), shortbill spearfish
- Tetrapturus audax (native), striped marlin

=== Kraemeriidae (sand darters) ===
- Kraemeria samoensis (native), Samoan sand dart

=== Kuhliidae (aholeholes) ===
- Kuhlia mugil (native), barred flagtail
- Kuhlia rupestris (native), rock flagtail

=== Kurtidae (nurseryfishes) ===
- Kurtus indicus (native), Indian humphead, Indian hump head

=== Kyphosidae (sea chubs) ===
- Kyphosus bigibbus (native), grey sea chub
- Kyphosus cinerascens (native), blue seachub
- Kyphosus vaigiensis (native), brassy chub

=== Labridae (wrasses) ===
- Anampses caeruleopunctatus (native), bluespotted wrasse
- Anampses meleagrides (native), spotted wrasse
- Bodianus neilli (native), Bay of Bengal hogfish
- Cheilinus chlorourus (native), floral wrasse
- Cheilinus fasciatus (native), redbreast wrasse
- Cheilinus oxycephalus (native), snooty wrasse
- Cheilinus trilobatus (native), tripletail wrasse
- Cheilinus undulatus (native), humphead wrasse
- Cheilio inermis (native), cigar wrasse
- Choerodon anchorago (native), orange-dotted tuskfish
- Choerodon robustus (native), robust tuskfish
- Cirrhilabrus exquisitus (native), exquisite wrasse
- Coris aygula (native), clown coris
- Coris formosa (native), queen coris
- Coris gaimard (questionable), yellowtail coris
- Cymolutes lecluse (questionable), sharp-headed wrasse
- Epibulus insidiator (native), slingjaw wrasse
- Gomphosus caeruleus (native), green birdmouth wrasse
- Gomphosus varius (native), bird wrasse
- Halichoeres argus (native), argus wrasse
- Halichoeres hortulanus (native), checkerboard wrasse
- Halichoeres marginatus (native), dusky wrasse
- Halichoeres nebulosus (native), nebulous wrasse
- Halichoeres nigrescens (native), bubblefin wrasse
- Halichoeres pardaleocephalus (native)
- Halichoeres scapularis (native), zigzag wrasse
- Halichoeres timorensis (native), Timor wrasse
- Halichoeres zeylonicus (native), goldstripe wrasse
- Hemigymnus fasciatus (native), barred thicklip
- Hemigymnus melapterus (native), blackeye thicklip
- Hologymnosus annulatus (native), ring wrasse
- Hologymnosus doliatus (native), pastel ringwrasse
- Iniistius pavo (native), peacock wrasse
- Labroides dimidiatus (native), bluestreak cleaner wrasse
- Leptojulis cyanopleura (native), shoulder-spot wrasse
- Macropharyngodon meleagris (native), blackspotted wrasse
- Novaculichthys taeniourus (native), rockmover wrasse
- Oxycheilinus bimaculatus (native), two-spot wrasse
- Oxycheilinus digramma (native), cheeklined wrasse
- Pseudocheilinus hexataenia (native), sixline wrasse
- Pseudodax moluccanus (native), chiseltooth wrasse
- Pteragogus flagellifer (native), cocktail wrasse
- Stethojulis albovittata (native), bluelined wrasse
- Stethojulis balteata (questionable), belted wrasse
- Stethojulis strigiventer (native), three-ribbon wrasse
- Stethojulis trilineata (native), three-lined rainbowfish
- Thalassoma amblycephalum (native), bluntheaded wrasse
- Thalassoma hardwicke (native), sixbar wrasse
- Thalassoma jansenii (native), Jansen's wrasse
- Thalassoma lunare (native), moon wrasse
- Thalassoma purpureum (native), surge wrasse
- Thalassoma quinquevittatum (native), fivestripe wrasse
- Xiphocheilus typus (native), blue-banded wrasse
- Xyrichtys bimaculatus (native), two-spot razorfish
- Xyrichtys cyanifrons (native)
- Xyrichtys dea (native)
- Xyrichtys pentadactylus (native), fivefinger wrasse
- Xyrichtys rajagopalani (native)

=== Lactariidae (false trevallies) ===
- Lactarius lactarius (native), big-jawed jumper, false trevally

=== Latidae (lates perches) ===
- Lates calcarifer (native), barramundi
- Psammoperca waigiensis (native), Waigeu seaperch, Waigieu seaperch

=== Leiognathidae (slimys, slipmouths, or ponyfishes) ===
- Gazza achlamys (native), smalltoothed ponyfish
- Gazza minuta (native), toothpony, toothpony
- Gazza rhombea (native), rhomboid toothpony
- Leiognathus berbis (native), Berber ponyfish
- Leiognathus bindus (native), orangefin ponyfish, orangefin ponyfish
- Leiognathus blochii (native), twoblotch ponyfish
- Leiognathus brevirostris (native), shortnose ponyfish
- Leiognathus daura (native), goldstripe ponyfish
- Leiognathus decorus (native), shortnose ponyfish, decorated ponyfish
- Leiognathus dussumieri (native), Dussumier's ponyfish
- Leiognathus elongatus (native), slender ponyfish
- Leiognathus equulus (native), common ponyfish
- Leiognathus fasciatus (native), striped ponyfish
- Leiognathus leuciscus (native), whipfin ponyfish
- Leiognathus lineolatus (native), ornate ponyfish
- Leiognathus longispinis (questionable)
- Leiognathus smithursti (native), Smithurst's ponyfish
- Leiognathus splendens (native), splendid ponyfish
- Leiognathus striatus (native)
- Secutor insidiator (native), pugnose ponyfish
- Secutor interruptus (native)
- Secutor ruconius (native), deep pugnose ponyfish

=== Lethrinidae (emperors or scavengers) ===
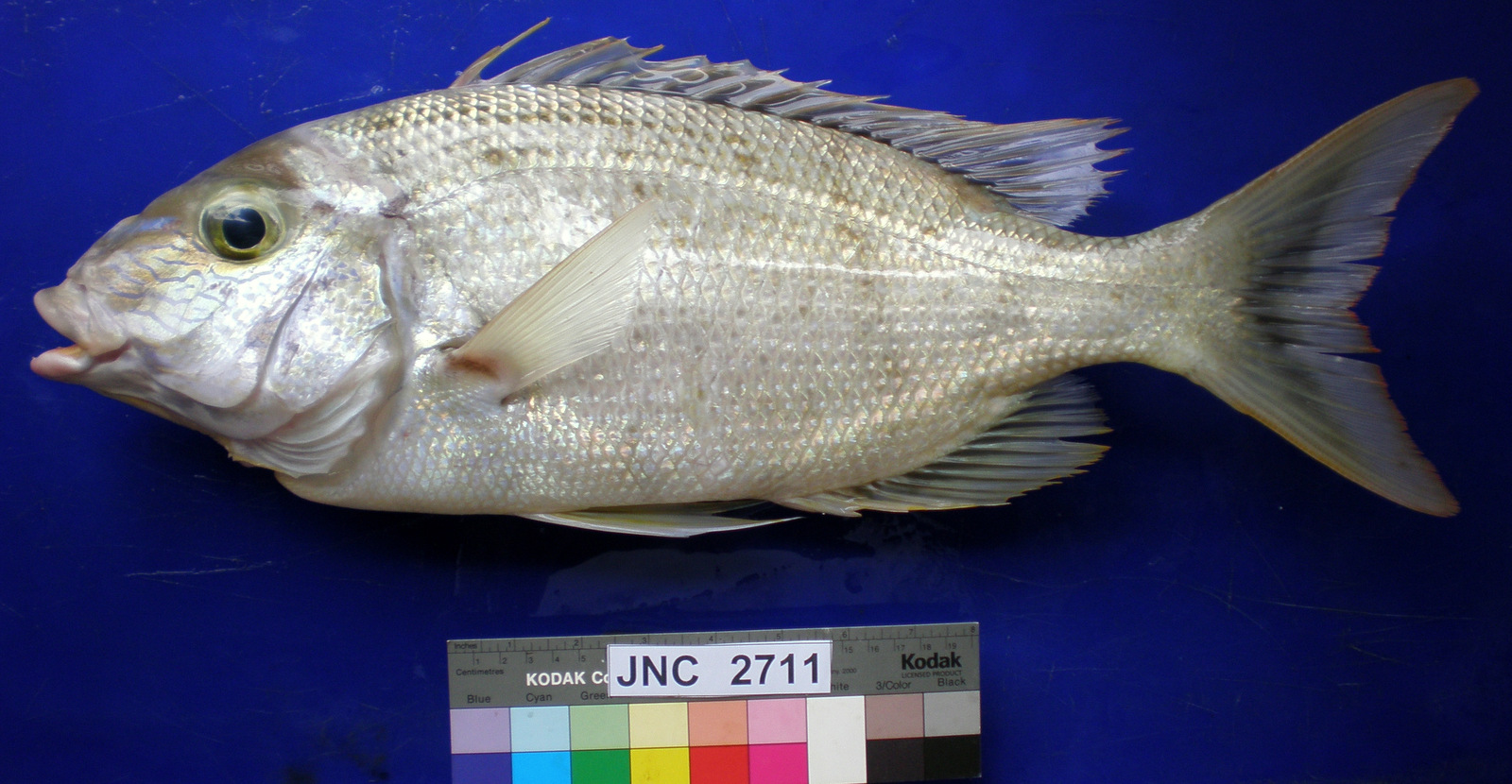
Gymnocranius grandoculis

- Gnathodentex aureolineatus (native), striped large-eye bream
- Gymnocranius elongatus (native), forktail large-eye bream
- Gymnocranius grandoculis (native), blue-lined large-eye bream
- Gymnocranius griseus (native), grey large-eye bream
- Lethrinus conchyliatus (native), redaxil emperor
- Lethrinus erythracanthus (native), orange-spotted emperor
- Lethrinus harak (native), thumbprint emperor
- Lethrinus lentjan (native), pig-face bream, pink ear emperor
- Lethrinus mahsena (native), sky emperor
- Lethrinus microdon (native), smalltooth emperor
- Lethrinus miniatus (questionable), trumpet emperor
- Lethrinus nebulosus (native), spangled emperor
- Lethrinus obsoletus (native), orange-striped emperor
- Lethrinus olivaceus (native), longface emperor
- Lethrinus ornatus (native), ornate emperor
- Lethrinus rubrioperculatus (native), spotcheek emperor
- Lethrinus semicinctus (native), black blotch emperor
- Lethrinus variegatus (native), slender emperor
- Lethrinus xanthochilus (native), yellowlip emperor
- Monotaxis grandoculis (native), humpnose big-eye bream
- Wattsia mossambica (native), Mozambique large-eye bream

=== Lobotidae (tripletails) ===
- Lobotes surinamensis (native), tripletail, Atlantic tripletail

=== Lutjanidae (snappers) ===
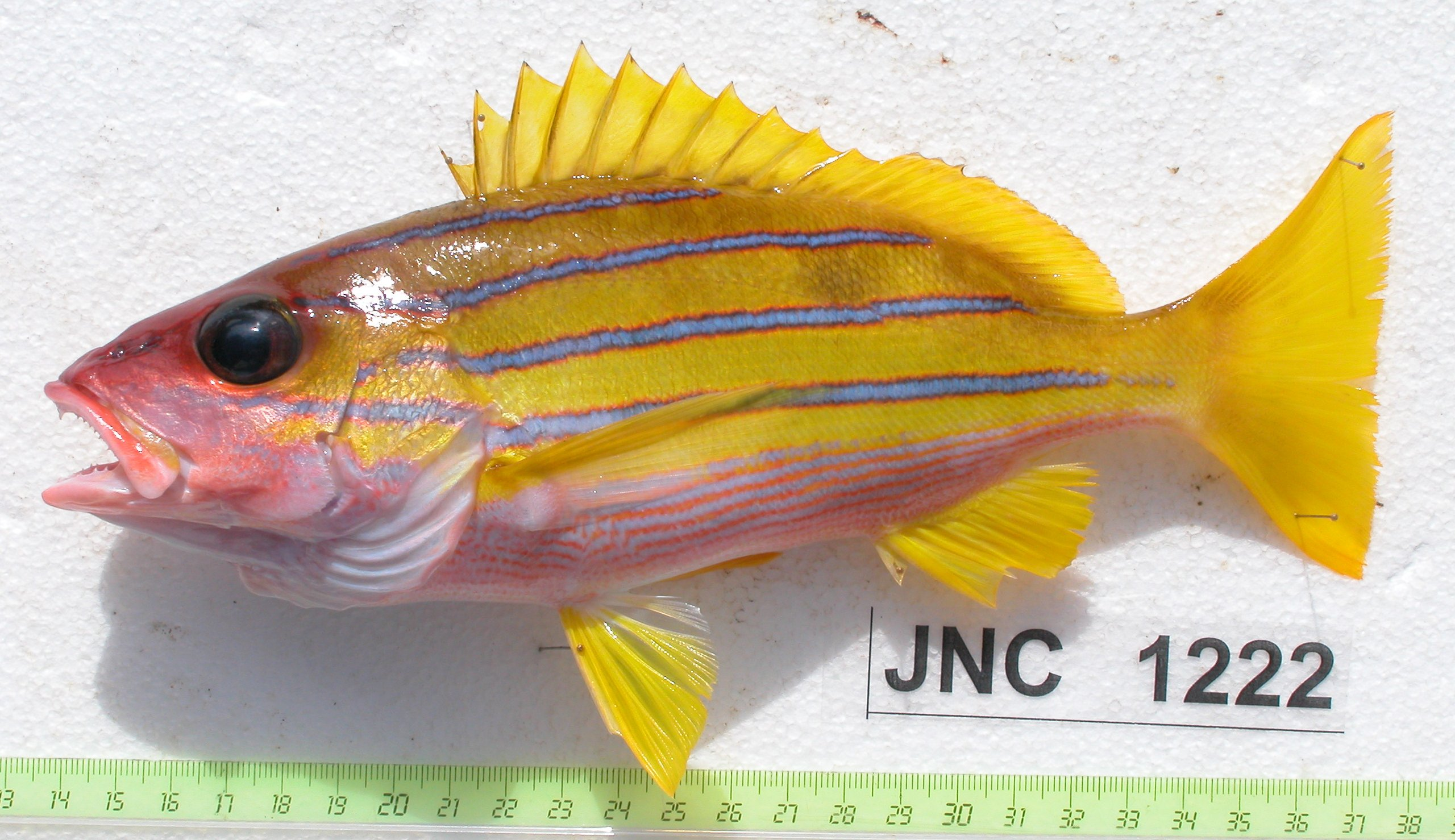
Lutjanus kasmira

- Aphareus furca (native), small toothed jobfish
- Aphareus rutilans (native), rusty jobfish
- Aprion virescens (native), green jobfish
- Apsilus fuscus (questionable), African forktail snapper
- Etelis carbunculus (native), ruby snapper
- Etelis coruscans (native), flame snapper
- Etelis radiosus (native), scarlet snapper
- Lipocheilus carnolabrum (native), Tang's snapper
- Lutjanus argentimaculatus (native), river snapper, mangrove red snapper
- Lutjanus bengalensis (native), Bengal snapper
- Lutjanus biguttatus (native), two-spot banded snapper
- Lutjanus bohar (native), two-spot red snapper
- Lutjanus carponotatus (native), Spanish flag snapper
- Lutjanus decussatus (native), checkered snapper
- Lutjanus ehrenbergii (native), blackspot snapper
- Lutjanus erythropterus (native), crimson snapper
- Lutjanus fulviflamma (native), dory snapper
- Lutjanus fulvus (native), blacktail snapper
- Lutjanus gibbus (native), humpback red snapper
- Lutjanus guilcheri (native), yellowfin red snapper
- Lutjanus johnii (native), John's snapper
- Lutjanus kasmira (native), common bluestripe snapper
- Lutjanus lemniscatus (native), yellowstreaked snapper
- Lutjanus lunulatus (native), lunartail snapper
- Lutjanus lutjanus (native), bigeye snapper
- Lutjanus madras (native), Indian snapper
- Lutjanus malabaricus (native), Malabar blood snapper
- Lutjanus monostigma (native), onespot snapper
- Lutjanus quinquelineatus (native), five-lined snapper
- Lutjanus rivulatus (native), blubberlip snapper
- Lutjanus rufolineatus (questionable), yellow-lined snapper
- Lutjanus russellii (native), Russell's snapper
- Lutjanus sanguineus (native), humphead snapper
- Lutjanus sebae (native), emperor red snapper
- Lutjanus vitta (native), brownstripe red snapper
- Macolor niger (native), black and white snapper
- Paracaesio sordida (native), dirty ordure snapper
- Paracaesio xanthura (native), yellowtail blue snapper
- Pinjalo lewisi (native), slender pinjalo
- Pinjalo pinjalo (native), pinjalo
- Pristipomoides filamentosus (native), crimson jobfish
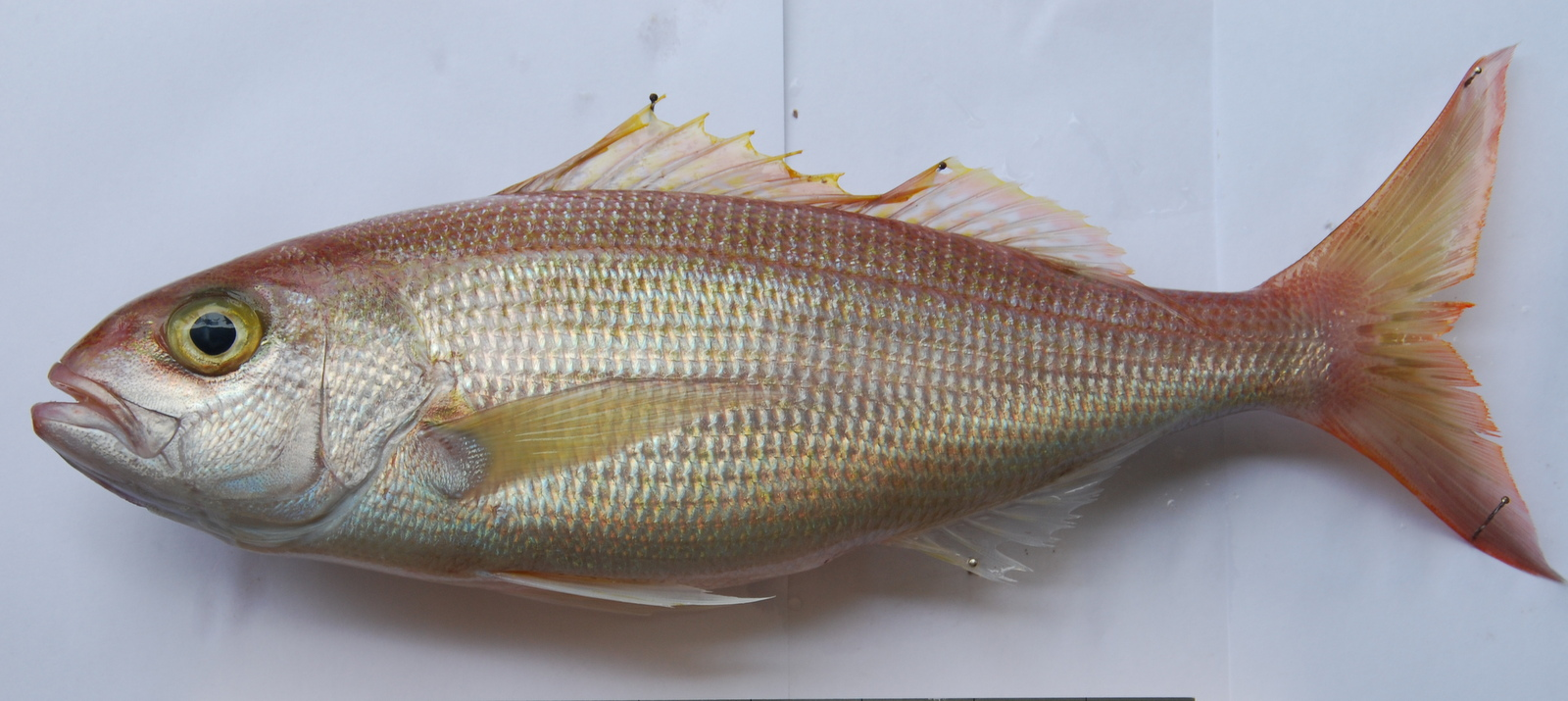
  Pristipomoides filamentosus
- Pristipomoides multidens (native), goldbanded jobfish
- Pristipomoides sieboldii (native), lavender jobfish
- Pristipomoides typus (questionable), sharptooth jobfish
- Pristipomoides zonatus (native), oblique-banded snapper

=== Malacanthidae (tilefishes) ===
- Hoplolatilus fronticinctus (native), pastel tilefish
- Malacanthus latovittatus (native), blue blanquillo

=== Menidae (moonfish) ===
- Mene maculata (native), moonfish

=== Monodactylidae (moonyfishes or fingerfishes) ===
- Monodactylus argenteus (native), silvery moony, silver moony
- Monodactylus falciformis (native), full moony

=== Mugilidae (mullets) ===
- Crenimugil crenilabis (native), fringelip mullet
- Liza carinata (native), keeled mullet
- Liza klunzingeri (native), Klunzinger's mullet
- Liza macrolepis (native), largescale mullet
- Liza mandapamensis (native), Indian mullet
- Liza melinoptera (native), giantscale mullet, otomebora mullet
- Liza parmata (questionable), broad-mouthed mullet
- Liza parsia (native), goldspot mullet, gold-spot mullet
- Liza subviridis (native), greenback mullet, greenback mullet
- Liza tade (native), Tade mullet
- Liza vaigiensis (native), squaretail mullet
- Mugil cephalus (native), flathead mullet
- Oedalechilus labiosus (native), hornlip mullet
- Rhinomugil corsula (native), corsula mullet, corsula
- Sicamugil cascasia (native), yellowtail mullet
- Sicamugil hamiltonii (questionable), Burmese mullet
- Valamugil buchanani (native), bluetail mullet
- Valamugil cunnesius (native), longarm mullet
- Valamugil seheli (native), bluespot mullet
- Valamugil speigleri (native), Speigler's mullet

=== Mullidae (goatfishes) ===
- Mulloidichthys flavolineatus (native), yellowstripe goatfish
- Parupeneus barberinus (native), dash-and-dot goatfish
- Parupeneus ciliatus (native), whitesaddle goatfish
- Parupeneus cyclostomus (native), goldsaddle goatfish
- Parupeneus heptacanthus (native), cinnabar goatfish
- Parupeneus indicus (native), Indian goatfish
- Parupeneus macronemus (native), longbarbel goatfish
- Parupeneus margaritatus (questionable), pearly goatfish
- Parupeneus multifasciatus (native), manybar goatfish
- Parupeneus pleurostigma (native), sidespot goatfish
- Parupeneus trifasciatus (native), doublebar goatfish
- Upeneus arge (native), band-tail goatfish
- Upeneus japonicus (questionable), Bensasi goatfish
- Upeneus luzonius (questionable), dark-barred goatfish
- Upeneus moluccensis (native), goldband goatfish
- Upeneus sulphureus (native), sunrise goatfish, sulphur goatfish
- Upeneus sundaicus (native), ochre-banded goatfish
- Upeneus taeniopterus (native), finstripe goatfish
- Upeneus tragula (native), freckled goatfish
- Upeneus vittatus (native), yellowstriped goatfish

=== Nandidae (Asian leaffishes) ===
- Nandus nandus (native), mottled nandus, Gangetic leaffish
- Pristolepis marginata (endemic), Malabar catopra, Malabar leaffish
- Pristolepis rubripinnis (endemic),
- Pristolepis pentacantha (endemic), aattuchemballi

=== Nemipteridae (threadfin breams, whiptail breams) ===
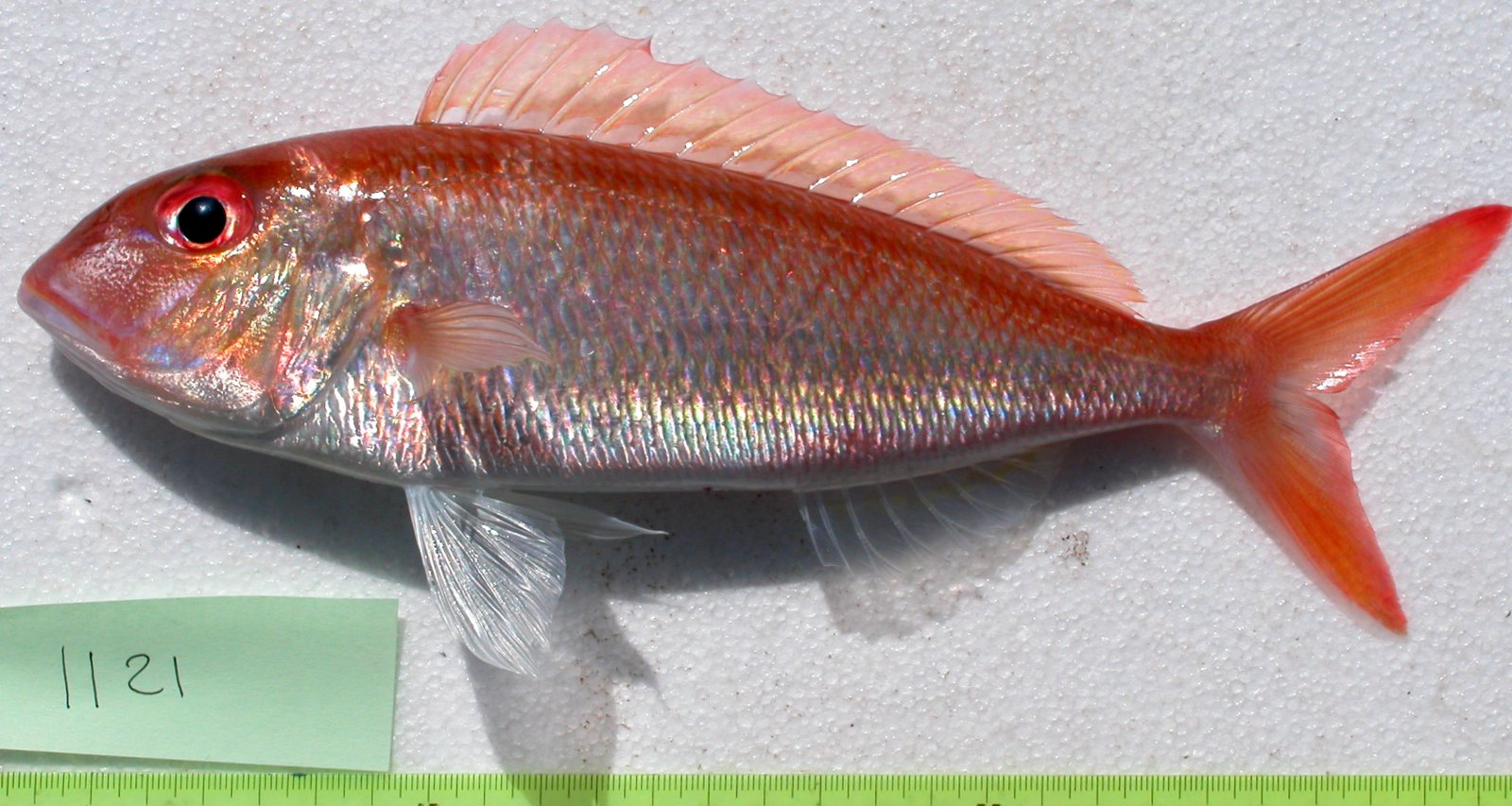
Nemipterus furcosus

- Nemipterus bipunctatus (native), Delagoa threadfin bream
- Nemipterus furcosus (native), fork-tailed threadfin bream
- Nemipterus hexodon (native), ornate threadfin bream
- Nemipterus japonicus (native), Japanese threadfin bream
- Nemipterus marginatus (questionable), red filament threadfin bream
- Nemipterus mesoprion (questionable), mauvelip threadfin bream
- Nemipterus nematophorus (native), doublewhip threadfin bream
- Nemipterus nemurus (questionable), redspine threadfin bream
- Nemipterus peronii (native), notchedfin threadfin bream
- Nemipterus randalli (native), Randall's threadfin bream
- Nemipterus zysron (native), slender threadfin bream
- Parascolopsis aspinosa (native), smooth dwarf monocle bream
- Parascolopsis boesemani (endemic), redfin dwarf monocle bream
- Parascolopsis eriomma (native), rosy dwarf monocle bream
- Parascolopsis inermis (native), unarmed dwarf monocle bream
- Parascolopsis townsendi (native), scaly dwarf monocle bream
- Pentapodus setosus (questionable), butterfly whiptail
- Scolopsis aurata (native), yellowstripe monocle bream
- Scolopsis bilineata (native), two-lined monocle bream
- Scolopsis bimaculatus (native), thumbprint monocle bream
- Scolopsis ciliata (native), saw-jawed monocle bream
- Scolopsis frenatus (native), bridled monocle bream
- Scolopsis ghanam (native), Arabian monocle bream
- Scolopsis lineata (native), striped monocle bream
- Scolopsis margaritifera (questionable), pearly monocle bream
- Scolopsis taeniatus (native), black-streaked monocle bream
- Scolopsis taenioptera (questionable), lattice monocle bream
- Scolopsis vosmeri (native), whitecheek monocle bream
- Scolopsis xenochrous (native), oblique-barred monocle bream

=== Nomeidae (driftfishes) ===
- Cubiceps squamiceps (native), Indian driftfish
- Psenes cyanophrys (native), freckled driftfish

=== Osphronemidae (gouramies) ===
- Belontia signata (questionable), Ceylonese combtail
- Colisa fasciata (native), giant gourami, banded gourami, Indian gourami
- Colisa lalia (native), dwarf gourami
- Ctenops nobilis (native), Indian paradisefish, frail gourami
- Osphronemus goramy (introduced), giant gouramy
- Parasphaerichthys ocellatus (questionable), eyespot gourami
- Pseudosphromenus cupanus (native), Day's paradise fish, spiketail paradisefish
- Pseudosphromenus dayi (endemic)
- Trichogaster chuna (native), sunset gourami, honey gourami

=== Pempheridae (sweepers) ===
- Parapriacanthus ransonneti (native), pigmy sweeper
- Pempheris mangula (native), black-edged sweeper
- Pempheris molucca (questionable)
- Pempheris oualensis (native), silver sweeper
- Pempheris vanicolensis (native), Vanikoro sweeper

=== Percophidae (duckbills) ===
- Bembrops caudimacula (native)
- Bembrops platyrhynchus (native), Natal duckbill

=== Pinguipedidae (sandperches) ===
- Parapercis alboguttata (native), whitespot sandsmelt
- Parapercis clathrata (questionable), latticed sandperch
- Parapercis hexophtalma (native), speckled sandperch
- Parapercis maculata (native), harlequin sandperch
- Parapercis pulchella (native), harlequin sandsmelt
- Parapercis punctata (native)
- Parapercis quadrispinosa (native)
- Parapercis tetracantha (native), reticulated sandperch

=== Plesiopidae (roundheads) ===
- Acanthoplesiops indicus (native), Scottie
- Plesiops coeruleolineatus (native), crimsontip longfin
- Plesiops corallicola (native), bluegill longfin

=== Polynemidae (threadfins) ===
- Eleutheronema tetradactylum (native), white salmon, fourfinger threadfin
- Filimanus heptadactyla (native), sevenfinger threadfin
- Filimanus similis (native)
- Filimanus xanthonema (native), yellowthread threadfin
- Leptomelanosoma indicum (native), Indian threadfin
- Polydactylus macrochir (native), king threadfin
- Polydactylus microstomus (native), small-mouthed threadfin
- Polydactylus mullani (native)
- Polydactylus multiradiatus (questionable), Australian threadfin
- Polydactylus plebeius (native), striped threadfin
- Polydactylus sexfilis (native), sixfinger threadfin
- Polydactylus sextarius (native), blackspot threadfin, blackspot threadfin
- Polynemus dubius (questionable), Borneo threadfin, eastern paradise fish
- Polynemus paradiseus (native), paradise threadfin, paradise threadfin

=== Pomacanthidae (angelfishes) ===
- Apolemichthys xanthurus (native), yellowtail angelfish
- Centropyge bicolor (native), bicolor angelfish
- Centropyge eibli (native), blacktail angelfish
- Centropyge multispinis (native), dusky angelfish
- Chaetodontoplus melanosoma (native), black-velvet angelfish
- Pomacanthus annularis (native), ringed angle fish, bluering angelfish
- Pomacanthus imperator (native), emperor angelfish
- Pomacanthus semicirculatus (native), semicircle angelfish

=== Pomacentridae (damselfishes) ===
- Abudefduf bengalensis (native), Bengal sergeant
- Abudefduf saxatilis (misidentification), sergeant major
- Abudefduf septemfasciatus (native), banded sergeant
- Abudefduf sexfasciatus (native), scissortail sergeant
- Abudefduf sordidus (native), blackspot sergeant
- Abudefduf vaigiensis (native), Indo-Pacific sergeant
- Amphiprion bicinctus (questionable), twoband anemonefish
- Amphiprion chrysogaster (questionable), Mauritian anemonefish
- Amphiprion ephippium (native), saddle anemonefish
- Amphiprion frenatus (questionable), tomato clownfish
- Amphiprion nigripes (questionable), Maldive anemonefish
- Amphiprion ocellaris (native), clown anemonefish
- Amphiprion percula (questionable), orange clownfish
- Amphiprion polymnus (questionable), saddleback clownfish
- Amphiprion sebae (native), sebae anemonefish
- Cheiloprion labiatus (native), big-lip damsel
- Chromis caerulea (native), green chromis
- Chromis chrysura (questionable), stout chromis
- Chromis dimidiata (native), chocolatedip chromis
- Chromis opercularis (native), doublebar chromis
- Chromis ternatensis (native), Ternate chromis
- Chromis viridis (native), blue green damselfish
- Chromis weberi (native), Weber's chromis
- Chrysiptera biocellata (native), twinspot damselfish
- Chrysiptera brownriggii (native), surge damselfish
- Chrysiptera cyanea (native), sapphire devil
- Chrysiptera glauca (native), grey demoiselle
- Chrysiptera unimaculata (native), onespot demoiselle
- Dascyllus aruanus (native), whitetail dascyllus
- Dascyllus reticulatus (questionable), reticulate dascyllus
- Dascyllus trimaculatus (native), threespot dascyllus
- Dischistodus perspicillatus (native), white damsel
- Dischistodus prosopotaenia (native), honey-head damsel
- Lepidozygus tapeinosoma (native), fusilier damselfish
- Neopomacentrus taeniurus (native), freshwater demoiselle
- Plectroglyphidodon dickii (native), blackbar devil
- Plectroglyphidodon lacrymatus (native), whitespotted devil
- Plectroglyphidodon leucozonus (native), singlebar devil
- Pomacentrus albicaudatus (questionable), whitefin damsel
- Pomacentrus brachialis (questionable), charcoal damsel
- Pomacentrus littoralis (questionable), smoky damsel
- Pomacentrus pavo (native), sapphire damsel
- Premnas biaculeatus (native), spinecheek anemonefish
- Pristotis obtusirostris (native), gulf damselfish
- Stegastes albifasciatus (native), whitebar gregory
- Stegastes lividus (native), blunt snout gregory
- Stegastes nigricans (native), dusky farmerfish
- Stegastes obreptus (native), western gregory

=== Pomatomidae (bluefishes) ===
- Pomatomus saltatrix (native), bluefish

=== Priacanthidae (Bigeyes or catalufas) ===
- Heteropriacanthus cruentatus (native), glasseye
- Priacanthus hamrur (native), moontail bullseye
- Priacanthus macracanthus (native), red bigeye
- Priacanthus prolixus (native), elongate bulleye
- Priacanthus tayenus (native), purple-spotted bigeye
- Pristigenys niphonia (native), Japanese bigeye

=== Pseudochromidae (dottybacks) ===
- Congrogadus subducens (native), carpet eel-blenny
- Halidesmus thomaseni (native), Thomasen's snakelet
- Pseudochromis caudalis (native)
- Pseudochromis tapeinosoma (native), blackmargin dottyback

=== Ptereleotridae ===
- Ptereleotris evides (native), blackfin dartfish
- Ptereleotris microlepis (native), blue gudgeon

=== Rachycentridae (cobia) ===
- Rachycentron canadum (native), cobia

=== Scaridae (parrotfishes) ===
- Calotomus spinidens (native), spinytooth parrotfish
- Calotomus viridescens (questionable), Viridescent parrotfish
- Chlorurus enneacanthus (native), captain parrotfish
- Chlorurus gibbus (native), heavybeak parrotfish
- Chlorurus oedema (native), knothead parrotfish
- Chlorurus sordidus (native), daisy parrotfish
- Hipposcarus harid (native), candelamoa parrotfish
- Leptoscarus vaigiensis (native), marbled parrotfish
- Scarus ghobban (native), blue-barred parrotfish
- Scarus globiceps (native), globehead parrotfish
- Scarus niger (native), dusky parrotfish
- Scarus prasiognathos (native), Singapore parrotfish
- Scarus psittacus (native), common parrotfish
- Scarus quoyi (native), Quoy's parrotfish
- Scarus rubroviolaceus (native), ember parrotfish
- Scarus russelii (native), eclipse parrotfish
- Scarus scaber (native), fivesaddle parrotfish
- Scarus tricolor (native), tricolour parrotfish

=== Scatophagidae (scats) ===
- Scatophagus argus (native), spotted scat

=== Schindleriidae ===
- Schindleria pietschmanni (questionable)
- Schindleria praematura (questionable), Schindler's fish

=== Sciaenidae (drums or croakers) ===
- Argyrosomus amoyensis (native), Amoy croaker
- Argyrosomus hololepidotus (misidentification), Madagascar meagre
- Argyrosomus japonicus (native), Japanese meagre
- Atrobucca alcocki (native)
- Atrobucca antonbruun (native)
- Atrobucca nibe (native), longfin kob
- Atrobucca trewavasae (native)
- Bahaba chaptis (native), chaptis bahaba
- Chrysochir aureus (native), Reeve's croaker
- Daysciaena albida (native), two-bearded croaker, Bengal corvina
- Dendrophysa russelii (native), goatee croaker
- Johnius amblycephalus (native), bearded croaker
- Johnius belangerii (native), Belanger's croaker
- Johnius borneensis (native), sharpnose hammer croaker
- Johnius carouna (native), Caroun croaker
- Johnius carutta (native), Karut croaker
- Johnius coitor (native), coitor croaker
- Johnius dussumieri (native), sharptooth hammer croaker, sin croaker
- Johnius elongatus (native), spindle croaker
- Johnius gangeticus (endemic), Gangetic bola
- Johnius glaucus (native), pale spotfin croaker
- Johnius macropterus (native), largefin croaker
- Johnius macrorhynus (native), big-snout croaker
- Johnius mannarensis (native), mannar croaker
- Johnius plagiostoma (native), large-eye croaker
- Kathala axillaris (native), kathala croaker
- Macrospinosa cuja (native), cuja bola
- Nibea chui (questionable), Chu's croaker
- Nibea maculata (native), blotched croaker
- Nibea soldado (native), soldier croaker
- Otolithes cuvieri (native), lesser tigertooth croaker
- Otolithes ruber (native), tiger-toothed croaker
- Otolithoides biauritus (native), bronze croaker
- Otolithoides pama (native), pama, pama croaker
- Panna heterolepis (native), Hooghly croaker
- Panna microdon (misidentification), panna croaker
- Paranibea semiluctuosa (native), half-mourning croaker
- Pennahia anea (native), greyfin croaker
- Pennahia macrocephalus (questionable), big-head pennah croaker
- Pennahia ovata (native)
- Protonibea diacanthus (native), spotted croaker, blackspotted croaker
- Pterotolithus maculatus (native), blotched tiger-toothed croaker
- Umbrina canariensis (native), canary drum

=== Scombridae (mackerels, tunas, bonitos) ===
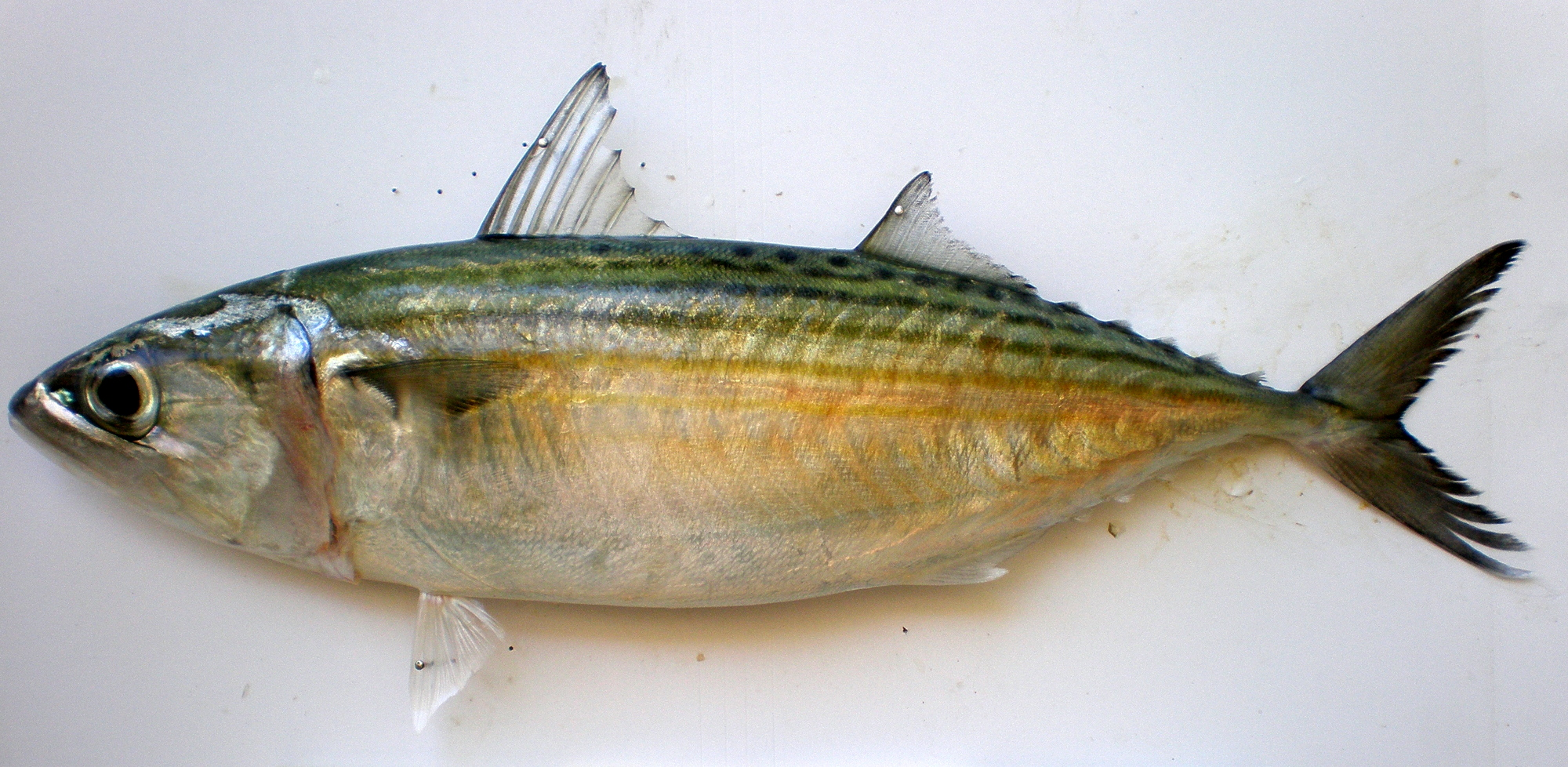
Indian mackerel, Rastrelliger kanagurta

- Acanthocybium solandri (native), wahoo
- Auxis rochei rochei (native), bullet tuna
- Auxis thazard thazard (native), frigate tuna
- Euthynnus affinis (native), mackerel tuna, kawakawa
- Grammatorcynus bicarinatus (questionable), shark mackerel
- Gymnosarda unicolor (native), dogtooth tuna, dogtooth tuna
- Katsuwonus pelamis (native), skiy jack, skipjack tuna
- Rastrelliger brachysoma (native), short mackerel
- Rastrelliger faughni (native), island mackerel
- Rastrelliger kanagurta (native), rake gillat mackerel, Indian mackerel
- Sarda orientalis (native), oriental bonito, striped bonito
- Scomber japonicus (native), chub mackerel
- Scomberomorus commerson (native), king seer, narrow-barred Spanish mackerel
- Scomberomorus guttatus (native), spotted Spanish mackerel, Indo-Pacific king mackerel
- Scomberomorus koreanus (native), Korean seerfish
- Scomberomorus lineolatus (native), streaked seer, streaked seerfish
- Thunnus alalunga (native), albacore
- Thunnus albacares (native), yellow fin tuna, yellowfin tuna
- Thunnus obesus (native), bigeye tuna
- Thunnus orientalis (native), Pacific bluefin tuna
- Thunnus tonggol (native), blue fin tuna, longtail tuna

=== Serranidae (sea basses: groupers and fairy basslets) ===
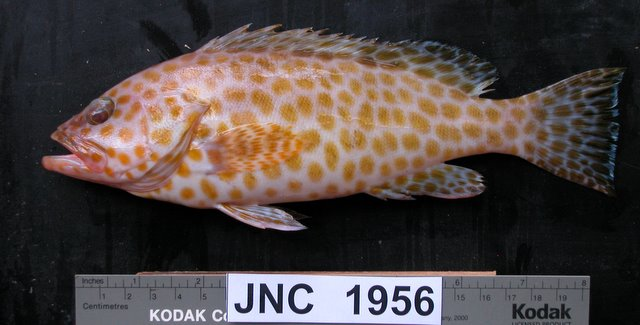
Epinephelus areolatus

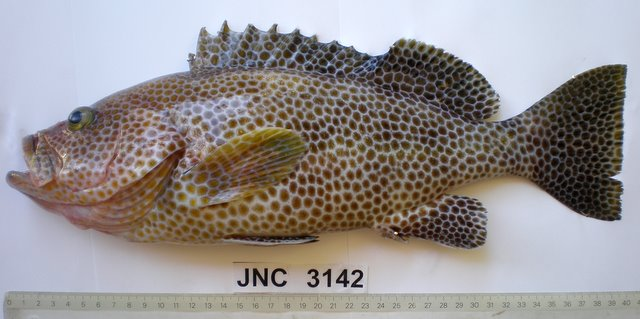
Epinephelus chlorostigma

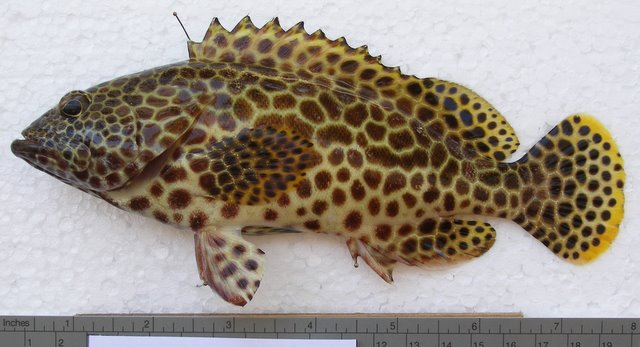
Epinephelus merra

- Aethaloperca rogaa (native), redmouth grouper
- Anyperodon leucogrammicus (native), slender grouper
- Aporops bilinearis (native), blotched podge
- Aulacocephalus temminckii (native), goldribbon soapfish
- Cephalopholis argus (native), balufana, peacock hind
- Cephalopholis aurantia (native), golden hind
- Cephalopholis boenak (native), chocolate hind
- Cephalopholis formosa (native), bluelined hind
- Cephalopholis leopardus (native), leopard hind
- Cephalopholis miniata (native), coral hind
- Cephalopholis sexmaculata (native), sixblotch hind
- Cephalopholis sonnerati (native), tomato hind
- Cephalopholis urodeta (native), darkfin hind
- Chelidoperca investigatoris (native)
- Cromileptes altivelis (native), humpback grouper
- Diploprion bifasciatum (native), barred soapfish
- Epinephelus areolatus (native), areolate grouper
- Epinephelus bleekeri (native), duskytail grouper
- Epinephelus chabaudi (native), moustache grouper
- Epinephelus chlorostigma (native), brownspotted grouper
- Epinephelus coeruleopunctatus (native), whitespotted grouper
- Epinephelus coioides (native), orange-spotted grouper
- Epinephelus corallicola (questionable), coral grouper
- Epinephelus diacanthus (native), spinycheek grouper
- Epinephelus epistictus (native), dotted grouper
- Epinephelus erythrurus (native), cloudy grouper
- Epinephelus fasciatus (native), blacktip grouper
- Epinephelus faveatus (native), barred-chest grouper
- Epinephelus flavocaeruleus (native), blue and yellow grouper
- Epinephelus fuscoguttatus (native), brown-marbled grouper
- Epinephelus hexagonatus (native), starspotted grouper
- Epinephelus lanceolatus (native), gridlebass, giant grouper
- Epinephelus latifasciatus (native), striped grouper
- Epinephelus longispinis (native), longspine grouper
- Epinephelus macrospilos (native), snubnose grouper
- Epinephelus maculatus (native), highfin grouper
- Epinephelus malabaricus (native), Malabar rockcod, Malabar grouper
- Epinephelus marginatus (questionable), dusky grouper
- Epinephelus melanostigma (native), one-blotch grouper
- Epinephelus merra (native), honeycomb grouper
- Epinephelus morrhua (native), comet grouper
- Epinephelus octofasciatus (native), eightbar grouper
- Epinephelus poecilonotus (native), dot-dash grouper
- Epinephelus polylepis (native), smallscaled grouper
- Epinephelus polyphekadion (native), camouflage grouper
- Epinephelus quoyanus (native), longfin grouper
- Epinephelus radiatus (native), oblique-banded grouper
- Epinephelus rivulatus (native), halfmoon grouper
- Epinephelus spilotoceps (native), foursaddle grouper
- Epinephelus stoliczkae (native), epaulet grouper
- Epinephelus summana (questionable), summan grouper
- Epinephelus tauvina (native), greasy rockcod, greasy grouper
- Epinephelus tukula (native), potato grouper
- Epinephelus undulosus (native), wavy-lined grouper
- Grammistes sexlineatus (native), sixline soapfish
- Plectropomus areolatus (native), squaretail coralgrouper
- Plectropomus maculatus (questionable), spotted coralgrouper
- Pogonoperca punctata (native), spotted soapfish
- Pseudanthias cichlops (questionable)
- Pseudanthias conspicuus (native)
- Pseudanthias cooperi (native), red-bar anthias
- Pseudanthias squamipinnis (native), sea goldie
- Pseudogramma polyacanthum (native), honeycomb podge
- Variola louti (native), yellow-edged lyretail

=== Siganidae (rabbitfishes) ===
- Siganus argenteus (native), streamlined spinefoot
- Siganus canaliculatus (native), white-spotted spinefoot
- Siganus corallinus (native), blue-spotted spinefoot
- Siganus fuscescens (native), mottled spinefoot
- Siganus guttatus (native), orange-spotted spinefoot
- Siganus javus (native), streaked spinefoot
- Siganus lineatus (native), golden-lined spinefoot
- Siganus magnificus (questionable), magnificent rabbitfish
- Siganus puelloides (native), blackeye rabbitfish
- Siganus punctatus (questionable), goldspotted spinefoot
- Siganus spinus (native), little spinefoot
- Siganus stellatus (native), brownspotted spinefoot
- Siganus vermiculatus (native), vermiculated spinefoot
- Siganus virgatus (native), barhead spinefoot

=== Sillaginidae (smelt-whitings) ===
- Sillaginopsis panijus (native), Gangetic whiting, flathead sillago
- Sillago aeolus (native), oriental sillago
- Sillago argentifasciata (questionable), silver-banded sillago
- Sillago chondropus (native), clubfoot sillago
- Sillago indica (endemic), Indian sillago
- Sillago ingenuua (native), bay sillago
- Sillago intermedius (native), intermediate sillago
- Sillago lutea (native), mud sillago
- Sillago macrolepis (questionable), large-scale sillago
- Sillago maculata (questionable), trumpeter sillago
- Sillago parvisquamis (questionable), small-scale sillago
- Sillago sihama (native), silver sillago, silver sillago
- Sillago soringa (endemic), soringa sillago
- Sillago vincenti (endemic), estuarine whiting, Vincent's sillago

=== Sparidae (porgies) ===
- Acanthopagrus berda (native), riverbream, Picnic seabream
- Acanthopagrus bifasciatus (native), twobar seabream
- Acanthopagrus latus (native), yellow seabream, yellowfin seabream
- Argyrops spinifer (native), king soldierbream
- Cheimerius nufar (native), santer seabream
- Crenidens crenidens (native), karanteen, karenteen seabream
- Diplodus noct (questionable), Red Sea seabream
- Diplodus sargus kotschyi (native), one spot seabream
- Rhabdosargus sarba (native), Natal stumpnose, goldlined seabream
- Sparidentex hasta (native), sobaity seabream

=== Sphyraenidae (barracudas) ===
- Sphyraena acutipinnis (native), sharpfin barracuda
- Sphyraena barracuda (native), great barracuda
- Sphyraena chrysotaenia (native), yellowstripe barracuda
- Sphyraena flavicauda (native), yellowtail barracuda
- Sphyraena forsteri (native), bigeye barracuda
- Sphyraena jello (native), pickhandle barracuda
- Sphyraena novaehollandiae (questionable), Australian barracuda
- Sphyraena obtusata (native), obtuse barracuda
- Sphyraena putnamae (native), sawtooth barracuda
- Sphyraena qenie (native), blackfin barracuda
- Pampus argenteus (native), silver pomfret
- Pampus chinensis (native), Chinese pomfret, Chinese silver pomfret

=== Symphysanodontidae ===
- Symphysanodon andersoni (native)

=== Terapontidae (grunters or tigerperches) ===
- Pelates quadrilineatus (native), fourlined terapon, fourlined terapon
- Pelates sexlineatus (questionable), six-lined trumpeter
- Terapon jarbua (native), jarbua terapon, jarbua terapon
- Terapon puta (native), smallscale terapon, small-scaled terapon
- Terapon theraps (native), banded grunter, largescaled therapon

=== Toxotidae (archerfishes) ===
- Toxotes chatareus (native), spotted archerfish, largescale archerfish
- Toxotes jaculatrix (native), banded archerfish, banded archerfish

=== Trichiuridae (cutlassfishes) ===
- Benthodesmus oligoradiatus (native), sparse-rayed frostfish
- Benthodesmus tenuis (questionable), slender frostfish
- Eupleurogrammus glossodon (native), longtooth hairtail
- Eupleurogrammus muticus (native), smallhead hairtail
- Lepidopus caudatus (questionable), silver scabbardfish
- Lepturacanthus pantului (native), Coromandal ribbonfish, Coromandel hairtail
- Lepturacanthus savala (native), small headed ribbon fish, Savalani hairtail
- Trichiurus auriga (native), pearly hairtail
- Trichiurus gangeticus (native), Gangetic ribbonfish, Ganges hairtail
- Trichiurus lepturus (native), largehead hairtail
- Trichiurus russelli (native), short-tailed hairtail

=== Trichonotidae (sanddivers) ===
- Trichonotus cyclograptus (native)
- Trichonotus setiger (native), spotted sand-diver

=== Tripterygiidae (threefin blennies) ===
- Enneapterygius elegans (native), hourglass triplefin
- Enneapterygius fasciatus (native)
- Enneapterygius pusillus (native), highcrest triplefin
- Helcogramma ellioti (native)
- Helcogramma gymnauchen (questionable), red-finned triplefin
- Helcogramma trigloides (questionable)

=== Uranoscopidae (stargazers) ===
- Ichthyscopus lebeck (native), longnosed stargazer
- Uranoscopus crassiceps (native)
- Uranoscopus guttatus (native)

=== Xenisthmidae ===
- Kraemericus smithi (endemic)

=== Xiphiidae (swordfish) ===
- Xiphias gladius (native), swordfish

=== Zanclidae (Moorish idol) ===
- Zanclus cornutus (native), Moorish idol

== Pleuronectiformes ==
=== Bothidae (lefteye flounders) ===
- Arnoglossus aspilos (native), spotless lefteye flounder
- Arnoglossus tapeinosoma (native)
- Bothus leopardinus (questionable), Pacific leopard flounder
- Bothus mancus (native), flowery flounder
- Bothus myriaster (native), Indo-Pacific oval flounder
- Bothus pantherinus (native), leopard flounder
- Chascanopsetta lugubris (native), pelican flounder
- Crossorhombus valderostratus (native), broadbrow flounder
- Engyprosopon cocosensis (native), Cocos Island flounder
- Engyprosopon grandisquama (native), largescale flounder
- Grammatobothus polyophthalmus (native), threespot flounder
- Psettina brevirictis (native)

=== Citharidae (citharids) ===
- Brachypleura novaezeelandiae (native), yellow-dabbled flounder

=== Cynoglossidae (tonguefishes) ===
- Cynoglossus arel (native), largescale tonguesole
- Cynoglossus bilineatus (native), fourlined tonguesole
- Cynoglossus carpenteri (native), hooked tonguesole
- Cynoglossus cynoglossus (native), Gangetic tonguesole, Bengal tongue sole
- Cynoglossus dispar (native), roundhead tonguesole
- Cynoglossus dubius (native), carrot tonguesole
- Cynoglossus itinus (questionable)
- Cynoglossus kopsii (native), shortheaded tonguesole
- Cynoglossus lachneri (questionable), Lachner's tonguesole
- Cynoglossus lida (native), shoulder spot tongue, roughscale tonguesole
- Cynoglossus lingua (native), long tonguesole, long tongue sole
- Cynoglossus macrostomus (native), Malabar-sole, Malabar tonguesole
- Cynoglossus monopus (native)
- Cynoglossus puncticeps (native), speckled tonguesole
- Cynoglossus semifasciatus (native), Malabar sole, Bengal tongue-sole
- Paraplagusia bilineata (native), fingerlip tonguesole, doublelined tonguesole
- Paraplagusia blochii (native), Bloch's tonguesole
- Symphurus trifasciatus (native), threeband tonguesole

=== Paralichthyidae (large-tooth flounders) ===
- Cephalopsetta ventrocellatus (native)
- Pseudorhombus arsius (native), largetooth flounder
- Pseudorhombus dupliciocellatus (native), ocellated flounder
- Pseudorhombus elevatus (native), deep flounder
- Pseudorhombus javanicus (native), Javan flounder
- Pseudorhombus malayanus (native), Malayan flounder
- Pseudorhombus micrognathus (native)
- Pseudorhombus natalensis (native), Natal flounder
- Pseudorhombus triocellatus (native), three spot flounder, three spotted flounder

=== Pleuronectidae (righteye flounders) ===
- Marleyella bicolorata (native), comb flounder
- Poecilopsetta colorata (native), coloured righteye flounder
- Poecilopsetta praelonga (native), Alcock's narrow-body righteye flounder

=== Psettodidae (psettodids) ===
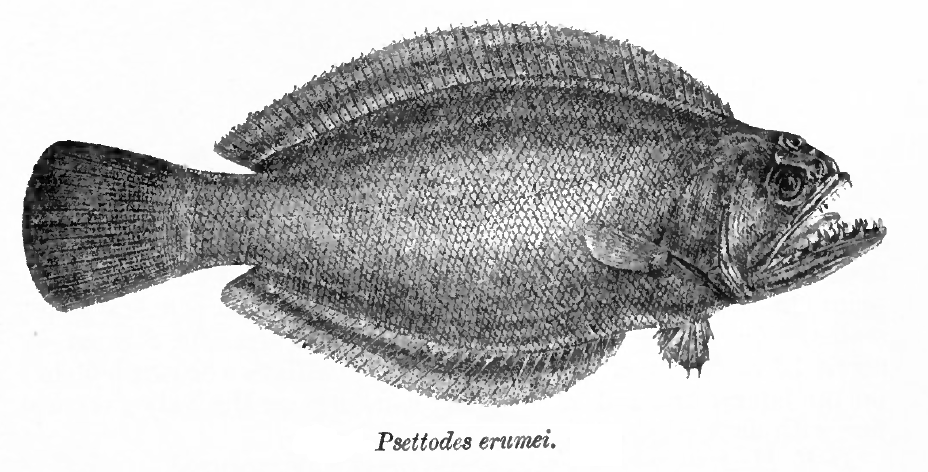
Psettodes erumei

- Psettodes erumei (native), Indian halibut, Indian spiny turbot

=== Samaridae ===
- Samaris cristatus (native), cockatoo righteye flounder
- Samariscus longimanus (native), longfinned flounder

=== Soleidae (soles) ===
- Aesopia cornuta (native), unicorn sole
- Brachirus macrolepis (native)
- Brachirus orientalis (native), oriental-sole, oriental sole
- Brachirus pan (native), pan sole, pan sole
- Brachirus panoides (questionable)
- Heteromycteris oculus (native), eyed sole
- Liachirus melanospilos (native)
- Pardachirus marmoratus (native), finless sole
- Pardachirus pavoninus (native), peacock sole
- Solea elongata (native), elongate sole
- Solea heinii (native)
- Solea ovata (native), ovate sole
- Soleichthys heterorhinos (native)
- Synaptura albomaculata (native), Kaup's sole
- Synaptura commersonnii (native), Commerson's sole
- Zebrias altipinnis (native)
- Zebrias annandalei (native)
- Zebrias japonica (questionable), wavyband sole
- Zebrias keralensis (native)
- Zebrias maculosus (native)
- Zebrias quagga (native), fringefin zebra sole
- Zebrias synapturoides (native), Indian zebra sole
- Zebrias zebra (questionable), zebra sole

== Polymixiiformes ==
=== Polymixiidae (beardfishes) ===
- Polymixia fusca (native)
- Polymixia japonica (questionable), silver eye

== Pristiformes ==
=== Pristidae (sawfishes) ===
- Anoxypristis cuspidata (native), knifetooth sawfish
- Pristis microdon (native), smalltooth sawfish, largetooth sawfish
- Pristis pectinata (native), smooth-tooth sawfish, smalltooth sawfish
- Pristis pristis (questionable), common sawfish
- Pristis zijsron (native), longcomb sawfish

== Rajiformes ==
=== Dasyatidae (stingrays) ===
- Dasyatis bennetti (native), Bennett's stingray
- Dasyatis kuhlii (native), bluespotted stingray
- Dasyatis microps (native), smalleye stingray
- Dasyatis pastinaca (questionable), common stingray
- Dasyatis zugei (native), pale-edged stingray
- Himantura alcockii (native), pale-spot whip ray
- Himantura bleekeri (native), whiptail stingray, Bleeker's whipray
- Himantura chaophraya (questionable), freshwater whipray
- Himantura fai (native), pink whipray
- Himantura fluviatilis (native), Gangetic stingray, Ganges stingray
- Himantura gerrardi (native), sharpnose stingray
- Himantura imbricata (native), scaly stingray, scaly whipray
- Himantura jenkinsii (native), pointed-nose stingray
- Himantura marginata (native), blackedged stingray, blackedge whipray
- Himantura uarnak (native), leopard stingray, honeycomb stingray
- Himantura undulata (native), leopard whipray
- Himantura walga (questionable), dwarf whipray
- Pastinachus sephen (native), feathertail stingray, cowtail stingray
- Taeniura lymma (native), bluespotted ribbontail ray
- Taeniura meyeni (native), blotched fantail ray
- Urogymnus asperrimus (native), porcupine ray

=== Gymnuridae (butterfly rays) ===
- Aetoplatea tentaculata (native), tentacled butterfly ray
- Aetoplatea zonura (native), zonetail butterfly ray
- Gymnura japonica (questionable), Japanese butterflyray
- Gymnura micrura (questionable), smooth butterfly ray
- Gymnura poecilura (native), longtail butterfly ray

=== Myliobatidae (eagle and manta rays) ===
- Aetobatus flagellum (native), plain eagleray, longheaded eagle ray
- Aetobatus guttatus (native), sharpwing eagle ray
- Aetobatus narinari (native), spotted eagleray, spotted eagle ray
- Aetobatus ocellatus (native)
- Aetomylaeus maculatus (native), mottled eagle ray
- Aetomylaeus milvus (native)
- Aetomylaeus nichofii (native), Nieuhof's eagle ray, banded eagle ray
- Manta birostris (native), giant manta
- Mobula eregoodootenkee (native), pygmy devilray
- Mobula japanica (native), spinetail mobula
- Mobula kuhlii (native), shortfin devil ray
- Mobula mobular (questionable), devil fish
- Mobula thurstoni (native), smooth-tail mobula
- Rhinoptera adspersa (native), rough cownose ray
- Rhinoptera javanica (native), Javanese cownose ray

=== Plesiobatidae (deepwater stingray) ===
- Plesiobatis daviesi (native), deepwater stingray

=== Rajidae (skates) ===
- Dipturus johannisdavisi (native), Travancore skate
- Fenestraja mamillidens (native), prickly skate
- Okamejei powelli (native), Indian ringed skate

=== Rhinobatidae (guitarfishes) ===
- Rhina ancylostoma (native), bowmouth guitarfish
- Rhinobatos annandalei (native), Annandale's shovelnose ray, Annandale's guitarfish
- Rhinobatos granulatus (native), sharpnose guitarfish
- Rhinobatos halavi (native), Halavi's guitarfish
- Rhinobatos lionotus (native), Norman's shovelnose ray, smoothback guitarfish
- Rhinobatos obtusus (native), widenose guitarfish
- Rhinobatos thouin (native), clubnose guitarfish
- Rhinobatos typus (questionable), giant shovelnose ray
- Rhinobatos variegatus (native), stripenose guitarfish
- Rhynchobatus djiddensis (native), giant guitarfish
- Zanobatus schoenleinii (questionable), striped panray

== Salmoniformes ==
=== Salmonidae (salmonids) ===
- Oncorhynchus mykiss (introduced), rainbow trout
- Oncorhynchus nerka (questionable), sockeye salmon
- Salmo trutta fario (introduced), brown trout
- Salmo trutta trutta (introduced), sea trout
- Salvelinus fontinalis (introduced), brook trout

== Scorpaeniformes ==
=== Apistidae ===
- Apistus carinatus (native), ocellated waspfish

=== Aploactinidae (velvetfishes) ===
- Acanthosphex leurynnis (native)
- Cocotropus roseus (native)

=== Bembridae (deepwater flatheads) ===
- Bembras japonica (questionable)

=== Caracanthidae (orbicular velvetfishes) ===
- Caracanthus maculatus (native), spotted coral croucher
- Caracanthus unipinna (native), pygmy coral croucher

=== Dactylopteridae (flying gurnards) ===
- Dactyloptena gilberti (native)
- Dactyloptena macracantha (native), spotwing flying gurnard
- Dactyloptena orientalis (native), oriental flying gurnard
- Dactyloptena peterseni (native), starry flying gurnard

=== Peristediidae (armored searobins or armored gurnards) ===
- Peristedion investigatoris (native)
- Satyrichthys adeni (native)

=== Platycephalidae (flatheads) ===
- Cociella crocodila (native), crocodile flathead
- Eurycephalus carbunculus (native), papillose flathead
- Grammoplites scaber (native), rough flathead
- Grammoplites suppositus (native), spotfin flathead
- Inegocia japonica (native), Japanese flathead
- Kumococius rodericensis (native), spiny flathead
- Platycephalus indicus (native), bartail flathead
- Rogadius asper (native), olive-tailed flathead
- Rogadius serratus (native), serrated flathead
- Sorsogona tuberculata (native), tuberculated flathead
- Suggrundus macracanthus (native), large-spined flathead
- Sunagocia otaitensis (native), fringelip flathead
- Thysanophrys celebica (native), Celebes flathead
- Thysanophrys chiltonae (native), longsnout flathead

=== Scorpaenidae (scorpionfishes or rockfishes) ===
- Brachypterois serrulata (native)
- Dendrochirus brachypterus (native), shortfin turkeyfish
- Ebosia falcata (native)
- Parascorpaena picta (questionable), northern scorpionfish
- Pteroidichthys amboinensis (native)
- Pterois antennata (native), broadbarred firefish
- Pterois mombasae (native), frillfin turkeyfish
- Pterois radiata (native), radial firefish
- Pterois russelii (native), Russell's fire fish, plaintail turkeyfish
- Pterois volitans (native), red lionfish
- Scorpaenodes guamensis (native), Guam scorpionfish
- Scorpaenodes muciparus (native)
- Scorpaenodes parvipinnis (native), lowfin scorpionfish
- Scorpaenopsis cirrosa (questionable), weedy stingfish
- Scorpaenopsis gibbosa (native), humpback scorpionfish
- Sebastapistes nuchalis (native)
- Sebastapistes strongia (native), barchin scorpionfish
- Taenianotus triacanthus (native), leaf scorpionfish

=== Setarchidae ===
- Setarches guentheri (native), deepwater scorpionfish

=== Synanceiidae (stonefishes) ===
- Choridactylus multibarbus (native), orangebanded stingfish
- Inimicus caledonicus (native), Chinese ghoul
- Inimicus sinensis (native), spotted ghoul
- Minous dempsterae (native), obliquebanded stingfish
- Minous inermis (native), Alcock's scorpionfish
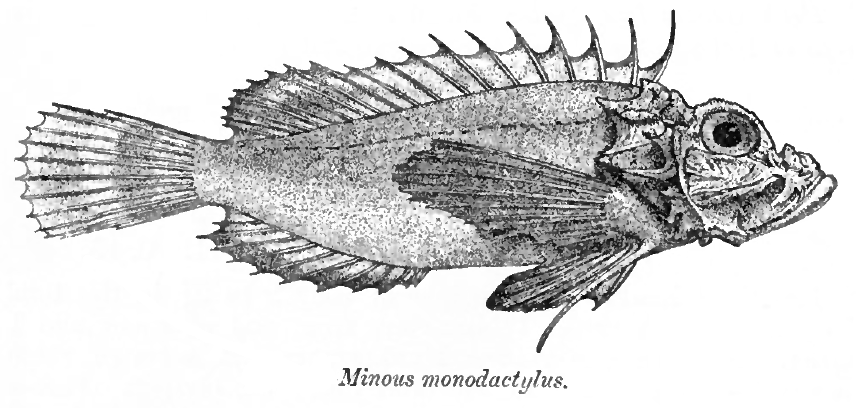
  Minous monodactylus
- Minous monodactylus (native), grey goblin fish, grey stingfish
- Synanceia horrida (native), estuarine stonefish
- Synanceia verrucosa (native), stonefish
- Trachicephalus uranoscopus (native), stargazing stonefish

=== Tetrarogidae (wasp fishes) ===
- Ocosia ramaraoi (native)
- Paracentropogon longispinis (native), wispy waspfish
- Pseudovespicula dracaena (native), draco waspfish
- Richardsonichthys leucogaster (native), whiteface waspfish
- Snyderina guentheri (native), Günther's waspfish
- Tetraroge niger (native)

=== Triglidae (searobins) ===
- Lepidotrigla bispinosa (native), bullhorn gurnard
- Lepidotrigla faurei (native), scalybreast gurnard
- Lepidotrigla longipinnis (native)
- Lepidotrigla omanensis (native), Oman gurnard
- Pterygotrigla hemisticta (native), blackspotted gurnard

== Siluriformes ==
=== Amblycipitidae (torrent catfishes) ===
- Amblyceps laticeps (native)
- Amblyceps mangois (native), Indian torrent catfish, Indian torrent catfish
- Amblyceps tenuispinis (native)
- Amblyceps apangi

=== Ariidae (sea catfishes) ===
- Arius arius (native), threadfin sea catfish
- Arius bilineatus (native), bronze catfish
- Arius caelatus (native), engraved catfish
- Arius crossocheilos (native), roughback sea catfish
- Arius dussumieri (native), blacktip sea catfish
- Arius gagora (native), gagora catfish, Gagora catfish
- Arius gagorides (native)
- Arius jella (native), blackfin sea catfish
- Arius macronotacanthus (questionable)
- Arius maculatus (native), spotted catfish
- Arius nenga (native)
- Arius parvipinnis (native)
- Arius platystomus (native), flatmouth sea catfish
- Arius sagor (native), sagor catfish
- Arius satparanus (native)
- Arius sona (native), Sona sea-catfish, Sona sea catfish
- Arius subrostratus (native), shovelnose sea catfish
- Arius sumatranus (native), goat catfish
- Arius tenuispinis (native), thinspine sea catfish
- Arius thalassinus (native), giant sea catfish
- Arius venosus (native), veined catfish
- Batrachocephalus mino (native), frog-headed catfish, beardless sea catfish
- Hemipimelodus jatius (native), river catfish, River catfish
- Ketengus typus (native), bigmouth sea catfish
- Osteogeneiosus militaris (native), soldier catfish

=== Bagridae (bagrid catfishes) ===
- Batasio batasio (native), Tista batasio
- Batasio merianiensis (native)
- Batasio sharavatiensis (native)
- Batasio tengana (native), Assamese batasio
- Batasio travancoria (endemic), Malabar batasio
- Hemibagrus maydelli (endemic), Krishna mystus
- Hemibagrus menoda (native), menoda catfish
- Hemibagrus microphthalmus (native), Irrawaddy mystus
- Hemibagrus punctatus (endemic), Nilgiri mystus
- Horabagrus brachysoma (endemic), Günther's catfish
- Horabagrus nigricollaris (endemic)
- Mystus armatus (native), Kerala mystus
- Mystus bleekeri (native), Day's mystus
- Mystus canarensis (native)
- Mystus cavasius (native), Gangetic mystus, Gangetic mystus
- Mystus gulio (native), long-whiskered catfish, long whiskers catfish
- Mystus keletius (native), Keletius mystus
- Mystus malabaricus (endemic), Jerdon's mystus
- Mystus montanus (endemic), Wynaad mystus
- Mystus oculatus (endemic), Malabar mystus
- Mystus tengara (native), Tengara mystus
- Mystus vittatus (native), striped dwarf catfish
- Pseudobagrus chryseus (native)
- Rama chandramara (native), Asian cory
- Rita chrysea (endemic), Mahanadi rita
- Rita gogra (endemic), Gogra rita
- Rita kuturnee (endemic), Deccan rita
- Rita macracanthus (native)
- Rita rita (native), rita
- Sperata aor (native), long-whiskered catfish
- Sperata aorella (native)
- Sperata sarwari (native)
- Sperata seenghala (native), giant river-catfish

=== Chacidae (squarehead or angler catfish) ===
- Chaca chaca (native), Indian chaca, squarehead catfish

=== Clariidae (airbreathing catfishes) ===
- Clarias batrachus (native), magur, walking catfish
- Clarias dayi (endemic), Malabar clariid
- Clarias dussumieri (endemic), Valenciennes clariid
- Clarias gariepinus (introduced), North African catfish
- Horaglanis alikunhii (native)
- Horaglanis krishnai (endemic), Indian blind catfish, Indian blind catfish

=== Erethistidae ===
- Conta conta (native), conta catfish
- Conta pectinata (native)
- Erethistes pusillus (native)
- Erethistoides montana montana (endemic)
- Erethistoides montana pipri (endemic)
- Erethistoides sicula (native)
- Laguvia manipurensis (native)
- Pseudolaguvia foveolata (native)
- Pseudolaguvia kapuri (endemic)
- Pseudolaguvia ribeiroi (native), painted catfish
- Pseudolaguvia shawi (native)

=== Heteropneustidae (airsac catfishes) ===
- Heteropneustes fossilis (native), stinging catfish
- Heteropneustes longipectoralis (native)
- Heteropneustes microps (native)

=== Olyridae (longtail catfishes) ===
- Olyra burmanica (questionable), longtail catfish
- Olyra horae (native), Hora olyra
- Olyra kempi (native)
- Olyra longicaudata (native), Himalayan olyra

=== Pangasiidae (shark catfishes) ===
- Pangasius pangasius (native), pungas, yellowtail catfish

=== Plotosidae (eeltail catfishes) ===
- Plotosus canius (native), canine catfish-eel, gray eel-catfish
- Plotosus limbatus (native), darkfin eel catfish
- Plotosus lineatus (native), striped eel catfish

=== Schilbeidae (schilbid catfishes) ===
- Ailia coila (native), Gangetic ailia
- Ailia punctata (native), Jamuna ailia
- Clupisoma bastari (endemic), Bastar garua
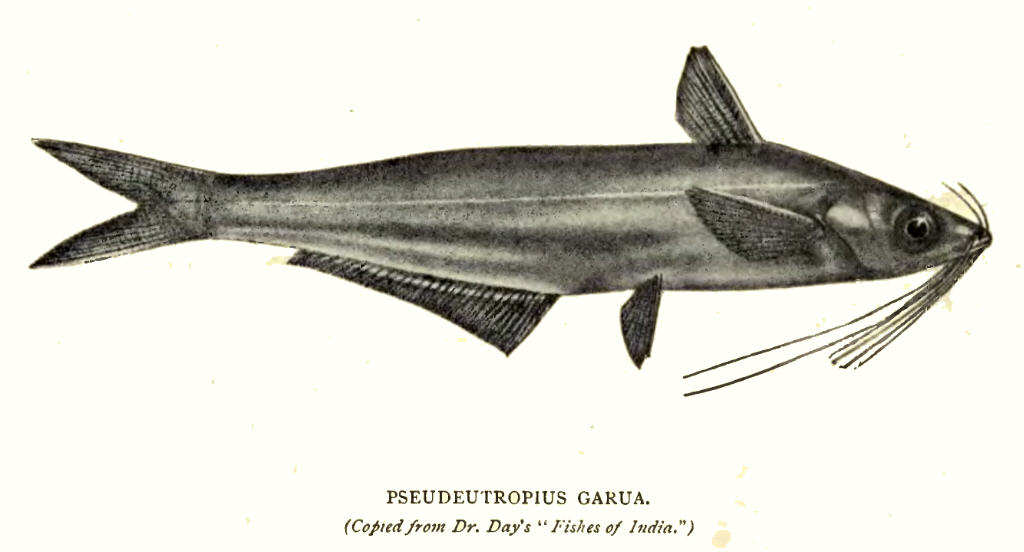
  Clupisoma garua
- Clupisoma garua (native), guarchcha, garua bachcha
- Clupisoma montana (native), kocha garua
- Clupisoma prateri (questionable), Burmese garua
- Eutropiichthys goongwaree (endemic)
- Eutropiichthys murius (native), murius vacha
- Eutropiichthys vacha (native), batchwa vacha
- Neotropius khavalchor (endemic), khavalchor catfish
- Proeutropiichthys taakree macropthalmos (questionable), Burmese taakree
- Proeutropiichthys taakree taakree (endemic), Indian taakree
- Pseudeutropius atherinoides (native), Indian potasi
- Pseudeutropius buchanani (native)
- Pseudeutropius mitchelli (endemic), Malabar patashi
- Silonia childreni (endemic), white catfish
- Silonia silondia (native), silondia vacha, Silond catfish

=== Siluridae (sheatfishes) ===
- Ompok bimaculatus (native), Indian butter-catfish, butter catfish
- Ompok goae (native)
- Ompok malabaricus (endemic), Goan catfish
- Ompok pabda (native), pabdah catfish
- Ompok pabo (native), Pabo catfish
- Pterocryptis afghana (native), Afghanistan silurus
- Pterocryptis berdmorei (questionable), Burmese silurus
- Pterocryptis cochinchinensis (questionable)
- Pterocryptis gangelica (native)
- Pterocryptis indicus (endemic)
- Pterocryptis wynaadensis (endemic), Malabar silurus
- Silurus morehensis (native), ching ngaten
- Wallago attu (native), boal, wallago

=== Sisoridae (sisorid catfishes) ===
- Bagarius bagarius (native), Gangetic goonch, dwarf goonch
- Bagarius yarrelli (native), goonch
- Euchiloglanis kishinouyei (questionable)
- Exostoma labiatum (native)
- Gagata cenia (native), Indian gagata
- Gagata gagata (native)
- Gagata itchkeea (native), Deccan nangra
- Gagata sexualis (endemic)
- Gagata youssoufi (native)
- Glyptosternon maculatum (native)
- Glyptosternon reticulatum (native), Turkestan catfish
- Glyptothorax annandalei (native)
- Glyptothorax botius (native)
- Glyptothorax brevipinnis (native)
- Glyptothorax cavia (native)
- Glyptothorax coheni (endemic)
- Glyptothorax conirostre (native)
- Glyptothorax davissinghi (native)
- Glyptothorax dorsalis (native)
- Glyptothorax garhwali (endemic)
- Glyptothorax gracilis (native)
- Glyptothorax housei (endemic)
- Glyptothorax indicus (native)
- Glyptothorax kashmirensis (native)
- Glyptothorax lonah (endemic)
- Glyptothorax madraspatanum (endemic)
- Glyptothorax manipurensis
- Glyptothorax nelsoni (endemic)
- Glyptothorax pectinopterus (native), river cat
- Glyptothorax platypogonides (questionable)
- Glyptothorax poonaensis (endemic)
- Glyptothorax punjabensis (native)
- Glyptothorax saisii (endemic)
- Glyptothorax sinensis (native)
- Glyptothorax stolickae (native)
- Glyptothorax striatus (endemic)
- Glyptothorax telchitta (native)
- Glyptothorax trewavasae (endemic)
- Glyptothorax trilineatus (native), three-lined catfish
- Glyptothorax ventrolineatus (sp. nov.), Chindwin basin.
- Gogangra viridescens (native), Huddah nangra
- Hara hara (native), Kosi hara
- Hara horai (endemic), Terai hara
- Hara jerdoni (native), Sylhet hara
- Hara serratus (native)
- Myersglanis jayarami (native)
- Nangra assamensis (native)
- Nangra carcharhinoides (native)
- Nangra nangra (native), Kosi nangra
- Nangra robusta (questionable)
- Parachiloglanis hodgarti (native), torrent catfish
- Pareuchiloglanis kamengensis (native)
- Pareuchiloglanis macrotrema (native)
- Pseudecheneis sulcata (native), sulcatus catfish, sucker throat catfish
- Sisor chennuah (native)
- Sisor rabdophorus (native), sisor catfish
- Sisor rheophilus (native)
- Sisor torosus (native)

== Squaliformes ==
=== Centrophoridae ===
- Centrophorus moluccensis (native), smallfin gulper shark

=== Dalatiidae (sleeper sharks) ===
- Centroscyllium ornatum (native), ornate dogfish
- Centroscymnus crepidater (native), longnose velvet dogfish

=== Echinorhinidae (bramble sharks) ===
- Echinorhinus brucus (native), bramble shark

== Stomiiformes ==
=== Gonostomatidae (bristlemouths) ===
- Cyclothone microdon (native), veiled anglemouth
- Cyclothone signata (questionable), showy bristlemouth
- Gonostoma elongatum (native), elongated bristlemouth fish

=== Phosichthyidae (lightfishes) ===
- Vinciguerria lucetia (questionable), Panama lightfish

=== Sternoptychidae ===
- Polyipnus spinosus (questionable)

=== Stomiidae (barbeled dragonfishes) ===
- Chauliodus pammelas (native)
- Chauliodus sloani (native), Sloane's viperfish
- Stomias affinis (native), Günther's boafish

== Synbranchiformes ==
=== Chaudhuriidae ===
- Chaudhuria caudata (questionable), Burmese spineless eel
- Garo khajuriai (endemic), Garo spineless eel
- Pillaia indica (endemic), hillstream spineless eel

=== Mastacembelidae (spiny eels) ===
- Macrognathus aculeatus (native), lesser spiny eel
- Macrognathus aral (native), one-stripe spinyeel
- Macrognathus caudiocellatus (questionable)
- Macrognathus guentheri (endemic), Malabar spinyeel
- Macrognathus malabaricus (native)
- Macrognathus morehensis (native)
- Macrognathus pancalus (native), striped spinyeel, barred spiny eel
- Mastacembelus armatus (native), baam, zig-zag eel

=== Synbranchidae (swamp-eels) ===
- Monopterus albus (native), rice swampeel, swamp eel
- Monopterus cuchia (native), cuchia
- Monopterus digressus (native)
- Monopterus eapeni (endemic)
- Monopterus fossorius (endemic), Malabar swampeel
- Monopterus hodgarti (endemic), Indian spaghetti-eel
- Monopterus indicus (endemic), Bombay swampeel
- Monopterus roseni (native)
- Ophisternon bengalense (native), Bengal mudeel, Bengal eel

== Syngnathiformes ==
=== Aulostomidae (trumpetfishes) ===
- Aulostomus chinensis (native), Chinese trumpetfish

=== Centriscidae (snipefishes and shrimpfishes) ===
- Centriscus scutatus (native), grooved razor-fish

=== Fistulariidae (cornetfishes) ===
- Fistularia petimba (native), red cornetfish

=== Solenostomidae (ghost pipefishes) ===
- Solenostomus cyanopterus (native), ghost pipefish

=== Syngnathidae (pipefishes and seahorses) ===
- Bhanotia fasciolata (native)
- Choeroichthys brachysoma (native), short-bodied pipefish
- Choeroichthys sculptus (native), sculptured pipefish
- Corythoichthys intestinalis (questionable), scribbled pipefish
- Doryrhamphus excisus excisus (native), bluestripe pipefish
- Hippichthys cyanospilos (native), blue-spotted pipefish
- Hippichthys heptagonus (native), belly pipefish
- Hippichthys penicillus (native), beady pipefish
- Hippichthys spicifer (native), bellybarred pipefish
- Hippocampus fuscus (questionable), Chilka seahorse, sea pony
- Hippocampus histrix (native), thorny seahorse
- Hippocampus kelloggi (native), great seahorse
- Hippocampus kuda (native), spotted seahorse
- Hippocampus trimaculatus (native), longnose seahorse
- Ichthyocampus carce (native), freshwater pipefish, freshwater pipefish
- Microphis brachyurus brachyurus (native), short-tailed pipefish
- Microphis cuncalus (native), crocodile-tooth pipefish
- Microphis deocata (native), deocata pipefish
- Microphis insularis (native), Andaman pipefish
- Phoxocampus belcheri (native), rock pipefish
- Syngnathoides biaculeatus (native), alligator pipefish
- Trachyrhamphus serratus (native)

== Tetraodontiformes ==
=== Balistidae (triggerfishes) ===
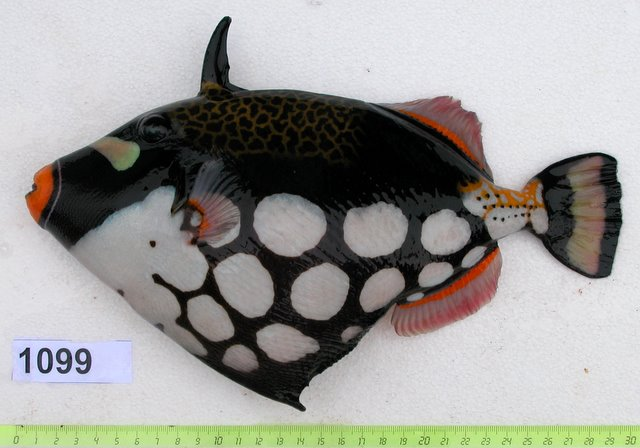
Balistoides conspicillum

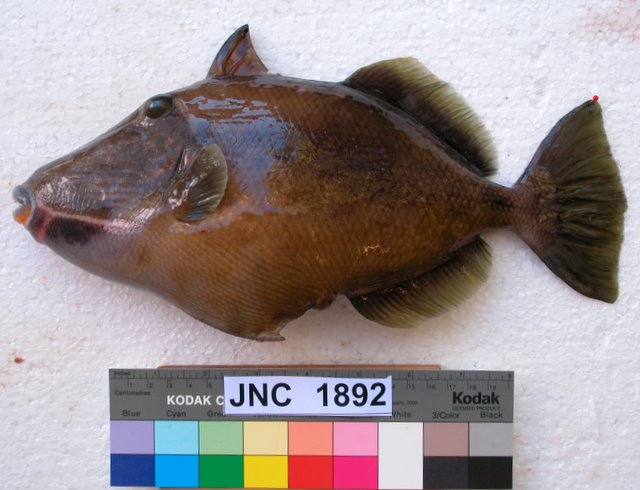
Sufflamen fraenatum

- Abalistes stellaris (native), starry triggerfish
- Balistapus undulatus (native), orange-lined triggerfish
- Balistes ellioti (native)
- Balistes rotundatus (native)
- Balistes vetula (questionable), queen triggerfish
- Balistoides conspicillum (native), clown triggerfish
- Balistoides viridescens (native), titan triggerfish
- Melichthys niger (native), black triggerfish
- Odonus niger (native), redtoothed triggerfish
- Pseudobalistes flavimarginatus (native), yellowmargin triggerfish
- Pseudobalistes fuscus (native), yellow-spotted triggerfish
- Rhinecanthus aculeatus (native), blackbar triggerfish
- Rhinecanthus rectangulus (native), wedge-tail triggerfish
- Sufflamen chrysopterum (native), halfmoon triggerfish
- Sufflamen fraenatum (native), masked triggerfish

=== Diodontidae (porcupinefishes, burrfishes) ===
- Cyclichthys orbicularis (native), birdbeak burrfish
- Cyclichthys spilostylus (native), spotbase burrfish
- Diodon holocanthus (native), bloched porcupine fish, long-spine porcupinefish
- Diodon hystrix (native), spotted porcupine fish, spot-fin porcupinefish
- Lophodiodon calori (native), four-bar porcupinefish

=== Molidae (molas or ocean sunfishes) ===
- Mola mola (native), ocean sunfish

=== Monacanthidae (filefishes) ===
- Acreichthys tomentosus (native), bristle-tail file-fish
- Aluterus monoceros (native), unicorn leatherjacket
- Aluterus scriptus (native), scrawled filefish
- Anacanthus barbatus (native), bearded leatherjacket
- Cantherhines sandwichiensis (questionable), Sandwich Isle file
- Lalmohania velutina (native)
- Oxymonacanthus longirostris (native), harlequin filefish
- Paraluteres prionurus (native), blacksaddle filefish
- Paramonacanthus choirocephalus (questionable), pig faced leather jacket
- Paramonacanthus japonicus (native), hairfinned leatherjacket
- Paramonacanthus oblongus (native), hair-finned filefish
- Paramonacanthus tricuspis (native)
- Thamnaconus modestoides (native), modest filefish

=== Ostraciidae (boxfishes) ===
- Lactoria cornuta (native), longhorn cowfish
- Ostracion cubicus (native), yellow boxfish
- Ostracion meleagris (native), whitespotted boxfish
- Ostracion nasus (native), shortnose boxfish
- Tetrosomus gibbosus (native), humpback turretfish

=== Tetraodontidae (puffers) ===
- Arothron hispidus (native), white spotted blow fish, white-spotted puffer
- Arothron immaculatus (native), immaculate blow fish, immaculate puffer
- Arothron leopardus (native), banded leopardblowfish
- Arothron meleagris (native), guineafowl puffer
- Arothron nigropunctatus (native), black spotted blow fish, blackspotted puffer
- Arothron reticularis (native), reticulated blowfish, reticulated pufferfish
- Arothron stellatus (native), star blaasop, starry toadfish
- Canthigaster amboinensis (native), spider-eye puffer
- Canthigaster bennetti (native), Bennett's sharpnose puffer
- Canthigaster coronata (native), crowned puffer
- Canthigaster margaritata (native)
- Carinotetraodon imitator (endemic)
- Carinotetraodon travancoricus (endemic), Malabar pufferfish
- Chelonodon patoca (native), Gangetic pufferfish, milkspotted puffer
- Lagocephalus guentheri (native), diamondback puffer
- Lagocephalus inermis (native), smooth-backed blowfish, smooth blaasop
- Lagocephalus lagocephalus lagocephalus (native), oceanic puffer
- Lagocephalus lunaris (native), moontail blaasop, green rough-backed puffer
- Lagocephalus spadiceus (native), Chinese blaasop, half-smooth golden pufferfish
- Takifugu oblongus (native), lattice blaasop
- Tetraodon cutcutia (native), ocellated pufferfish
- Tetraodon fluviatilis (native), green pufferfish
- Tetraodon nigroviridis (native), Burmese pufferfish, spotted green pufferfish
- Torquigener hypselogeneion (native), orange-spotted toadfish
- Tylerius spinosissimus (native), spiny blaasop

=== Triacanthidae (triplespines) ===
- Pseudotriacanthus strigilifer (native), long spined tripod fish, long-spined tripodfish
- Triacanthus biaculeatus (native), short-nosed tripodfish
- Triacanthus nieuhofii (native), silver tripodfish
- Tripodichthys oxycephalus (native), short-tail tripodfish

=== Triacanthodidae (spikefishes) ===
- Macrorhamphosodes platycheilus (native), trumpetsnout spikefish
- Triacanthodes ethiops (native), shortsnout spikefish

== Torpediniformes ==
=== Narcinidae (numbfishes) ===
- Benthobatis moresbyi (native), dark blind ray
- Heteronarce prabhui (native), Quilon electric ray
- Narcine brunnea (native), brown numbfish
- Narcine indica (questionable), largespotted numbfish
- Narcine lingula (native), Chinese numbfish
- Narcine prodorsalis (questionable), Tonkin numbfish
- Narcine timlei (native), blackspotted numbfish
- Narke dipterygia (native), spottail sleeper ray

=== Torpedinidae (electric rays) ===
- Torpedo fuscomaculata (questionable), black-spotted torpedo
- Torpedo panthera (native), panther electric ray
- Torpedo sinuspersici (native), marbled electric ray

== Zeiformes ==
=== Caproidae (boarfishes) ===
- Antigonia indica (native)
- Antigonia rubescens (questionable), Indo-Pacific boarfish

=== Parazenidae (parazen) ===
- Cyttopsis rosea (native), rosy dory

=== Zeidae (dories) ===
- Zenopsis conchifera (native), silvery John Dory
- Zenopsis nebulosa (native), mirror dory

== See also ==
- Indian carp
- List of fishes of Pune district
- Wildlife of India
