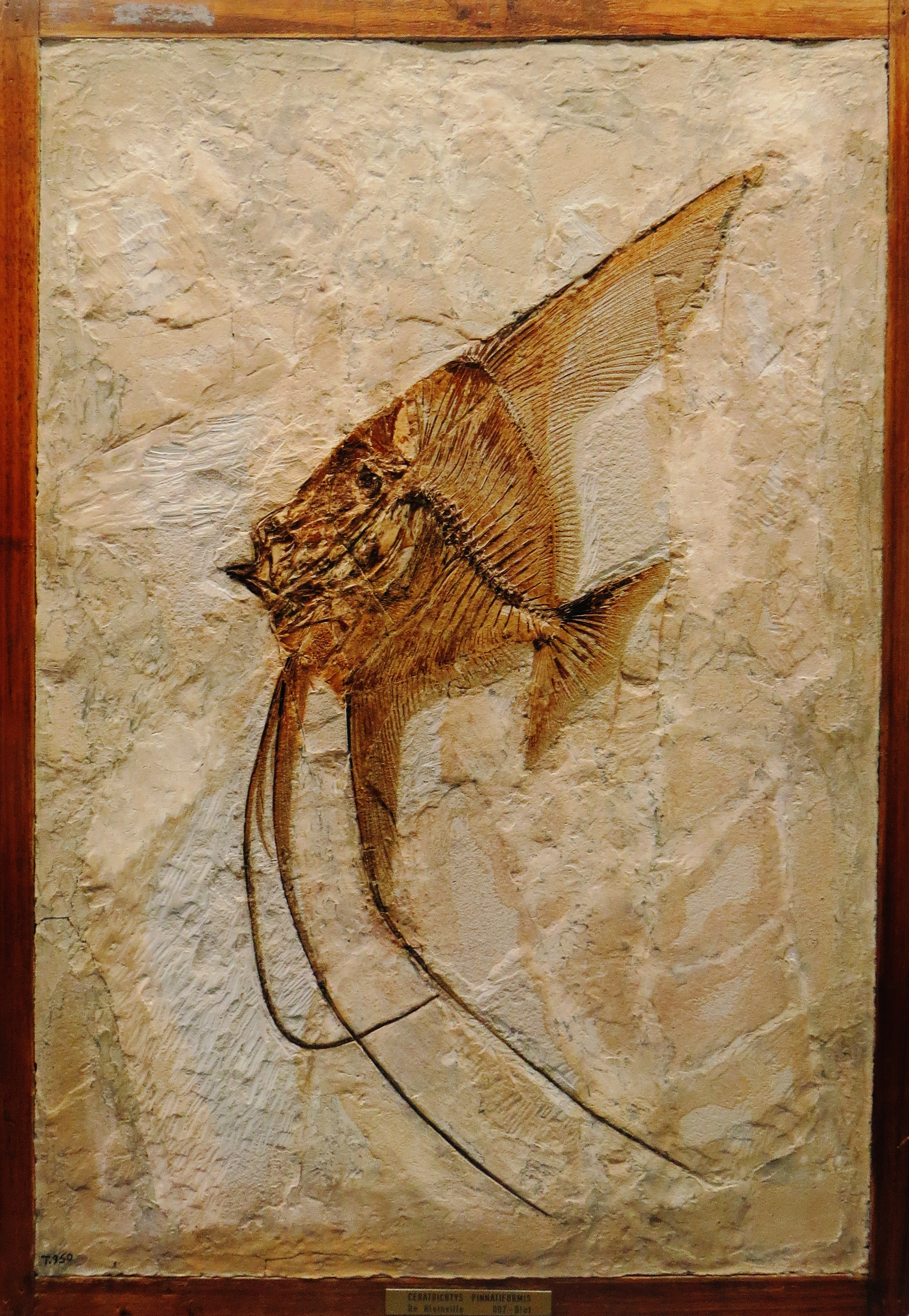
- Fossil specimen

Scientific classification
- Domain: Eukaryota
- Kingdom: Animalia
- Phylum: Chordata
- Class: Actinopterygii
- Order: Carangiformes
- Suborder: Carangoidei
- Family: Carangidae
- Subfamily: †Vomeropsinae
- Genus: †Ceratoichthys; Blot, 1969
- Species: †C. pinnatiformis

Binomial name
- †Ceratoichthys pinnatiformis (Blainville, 1818)

= Ceratoichthys =

Ceratoichthys Temporal range: Early Eocene

Extinct species of fish

Ceratoichthys is an extinct genus of lookdown-like prehistoric jackfish that lived during the late Ypresian epoch, of the Early Eocene. It contains a single species, C. pinnatiformis of Monte Bolca, Italy. It and Vomeropsis are the only known members of the extinct subfamily Vomeropsinae.

The dorsal and anal fins of C. pinnatiformis had very high, narrow crests, and it also had very long, thin pelvic fins. Its fins give it a superficial resemblance to a freshwater angelfish, leading some people to erroneously refer to C. pinnatiformis as an "angelfish," too.

It is the official symbol of the Società Paleontologica Italiana (Italian Paleontological Society).

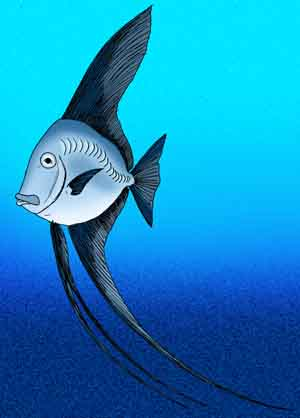
Artist's reconstruction

== See also ==
- Prehistoric fish
- List of prehistoric bony fish
