= Lookdown (disambiguation) =

Lookdown usually refers to a single species of fish, Selene vomer

Lookdown may also refer to the following fish:

- Selene brevoortii, known as the Airfin lookdown, Hairfin lookdown, or Mexican lookdown
- Lookdown dory, Cyttus traversi
