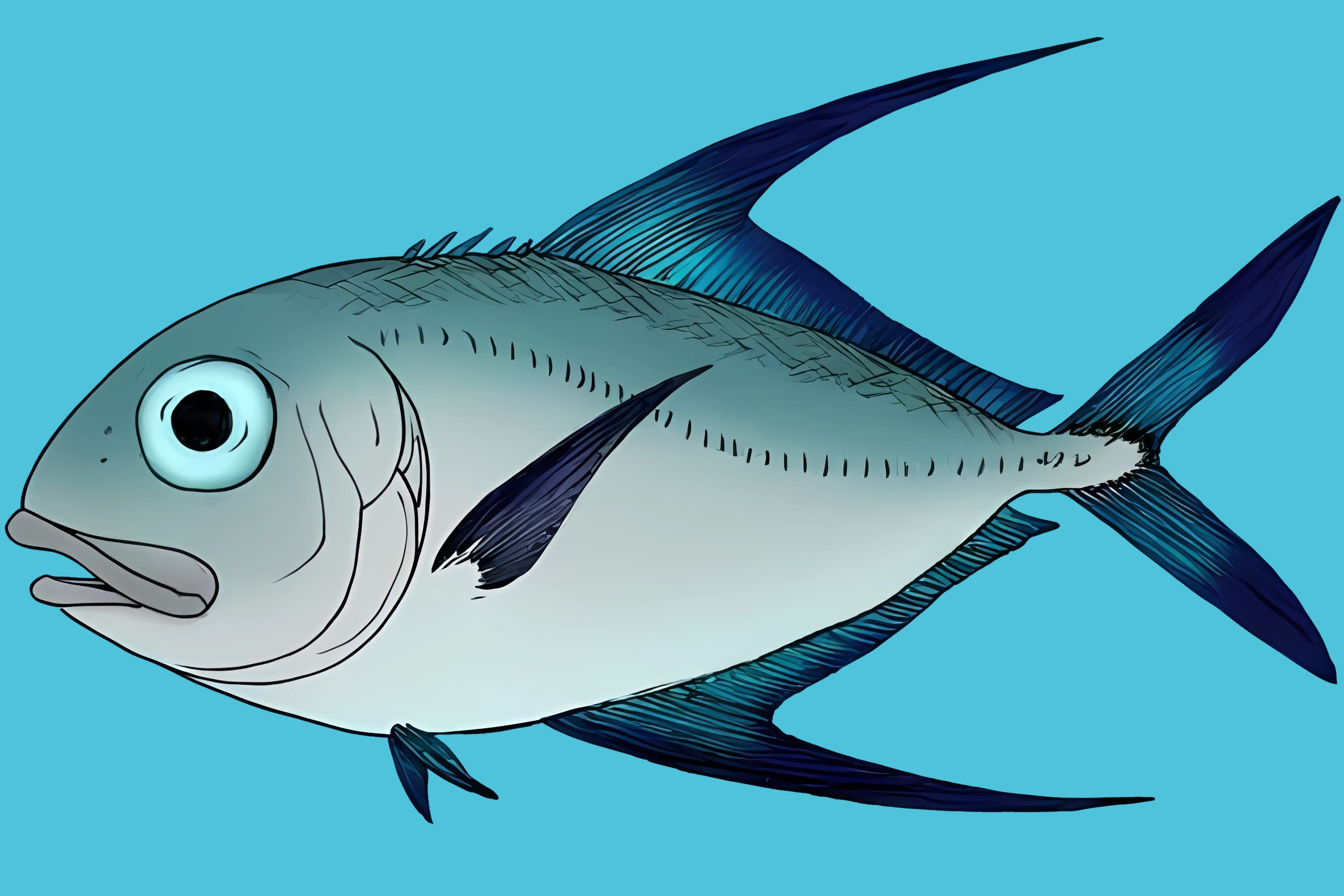
- Artist's reconstruction

Scientific classification
- Kingdom: Animalia
- Phylum: Chordata
- Class: Actinopterygii
- Order: Carangiformes
- Suborder: Carangoidei
- Family: Carangidae
- Genus: †Pseudovomer
- Species: †P. minutus

Binomial name
- †Pseudovomer minutus Sauvage, 1870

= Pseudovomer =

Pseudovomer Temporal range: Messinian

Extinct species of fish

Pseudovomer minutus is an extinct species of prehistoric, Miocene carangid similar to the modern-day lookdown, Selene vomer, that lived during the Messinian subepoch of what is now Sicily.

== See also ==
- Prehistoric fish
- List of prehistoric bony fish
