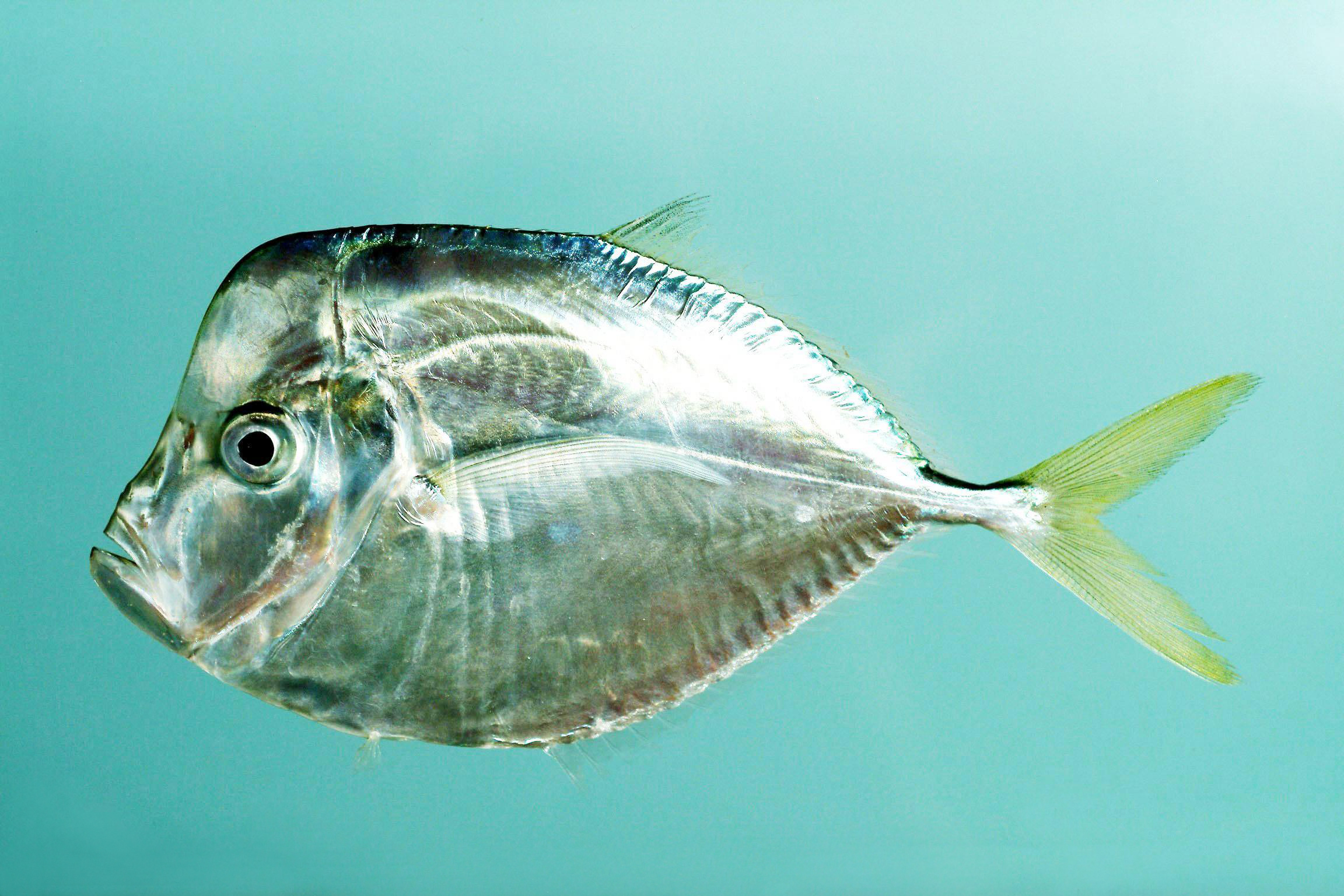

Conservation status
- Least Concern (IUCN 3.1)

Scientific classification
- Kingdom: Animalia
- Phylum: Chordata
- Class: Actinopterygii
- Division: Teleostei
- Order: Carangiformes
- Suborder: Carangoidei
- Family: Carangidae
- Genus: Selene
- Species: S. setapinnis

Binomial name
- Selene setapinnis (Mitchill, 1815)

Synonyms
- Zeus setapinnis Mitchill, 1815; Vomer setapinnis (Mitchill, 1815)

= Selene setapinnis =

Species of fish

Selene setapinnis, the Atlantic moonfish, is a West Atlantic fish belonging to the family Carangidae.

== Description ==
The Atlantic moonfish is a slender, deep-bodied fish that is extremely compressed. It has a dorsal fin with 8 spines and an anal fin with 2 spines. They also have 21 dorsal soft rays and 17 anal soft rays. The upper jaw is short and lower jaw is protruding, extending longer than the upper jaw. They have a sloped, bent forehead and rather large eyes. They have a forked caudal fin that is attached to a large and hard caudal peduncle. The Atlantic moonfish have a faint spot on the base of their pectoral fins. They have a silvery or metallic blue color with a yellowish caudal fin. The dorsal and caudal peduncle regions are lined with a dark edging. Atlantic Moonfish grow to a maximum length of 39 centimeters.

== Diet ==
Adults feed on small fish and crustaceans.

== Habitat ==
Atlantic moonfish can be found in schools at the bottoms of inshore waters. Juveniles can be found on muddy bottoms of brackish waters. Their depth range is 0–55 m, and they prefer subtropical regions.

== Distribution ==
Western Atlantic: Nova Scotia, Canada, along coasts of Gulf of Mexico and South America, Argentina. Replaced by Selene dorsalis in eastern Atlantic.

== Naming and etymology ==
Selene setapinnis was formally described by the American ichthyologist Samuel L. Mitchill as Zeus setapinnis in 1815 with the type locality given as the Bay of New York, New York, U.S.A. The generic name Selene is from the Greek for "moon", referring to the vague moon-shape of S. vomer while the specific name is a compound of seta meaning "bristle" and pinnis meaning "fin" and refers to the bristle-like points of the dorsal fin and the anal fin.
