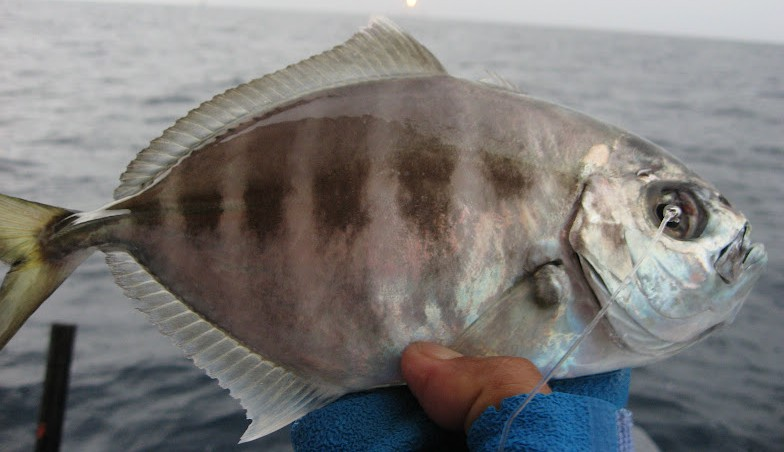

Conservation status
- Least Concern (IUCN 3.1)

Scientific classification
- Kingdom: Animalia
- Phylum: Chordata
- Class: Actinopterygii
- Order: Carangiformes
- Suborder: Carangoidei
- Family: Carangidae
- Genus: Uraspis
- Species: U. uraspis

Binomial name
- Uraspis uraspis (Günther, 1860)

Synonyms
- Caranx uraspis Günther, 1860; Uraspis carangoides Bleeker, 1855; Caranx guptae B. L. Chaudhuri, 1909; Leucoglossa herklotsi Herre, 1932; Uraspis pectoralis Fowler, 1938

= Uraspis uraspis =

Species of fish

Uraspis uraspis is a species of jack in the family Carangidae. It is found in the Indo-Pacific.

== Distribution and habitat ==
This fish is found in the Indo-Pacific. Its range extends from the Red Sea and the Persian Gulf to Sri Lanka in the Indian Ocean, and from the Philippines to the Ryukyu Islands in Japan and east towards Hawaii.

== Description ==
Adults can grow up to 28 centimetres (11 in).
