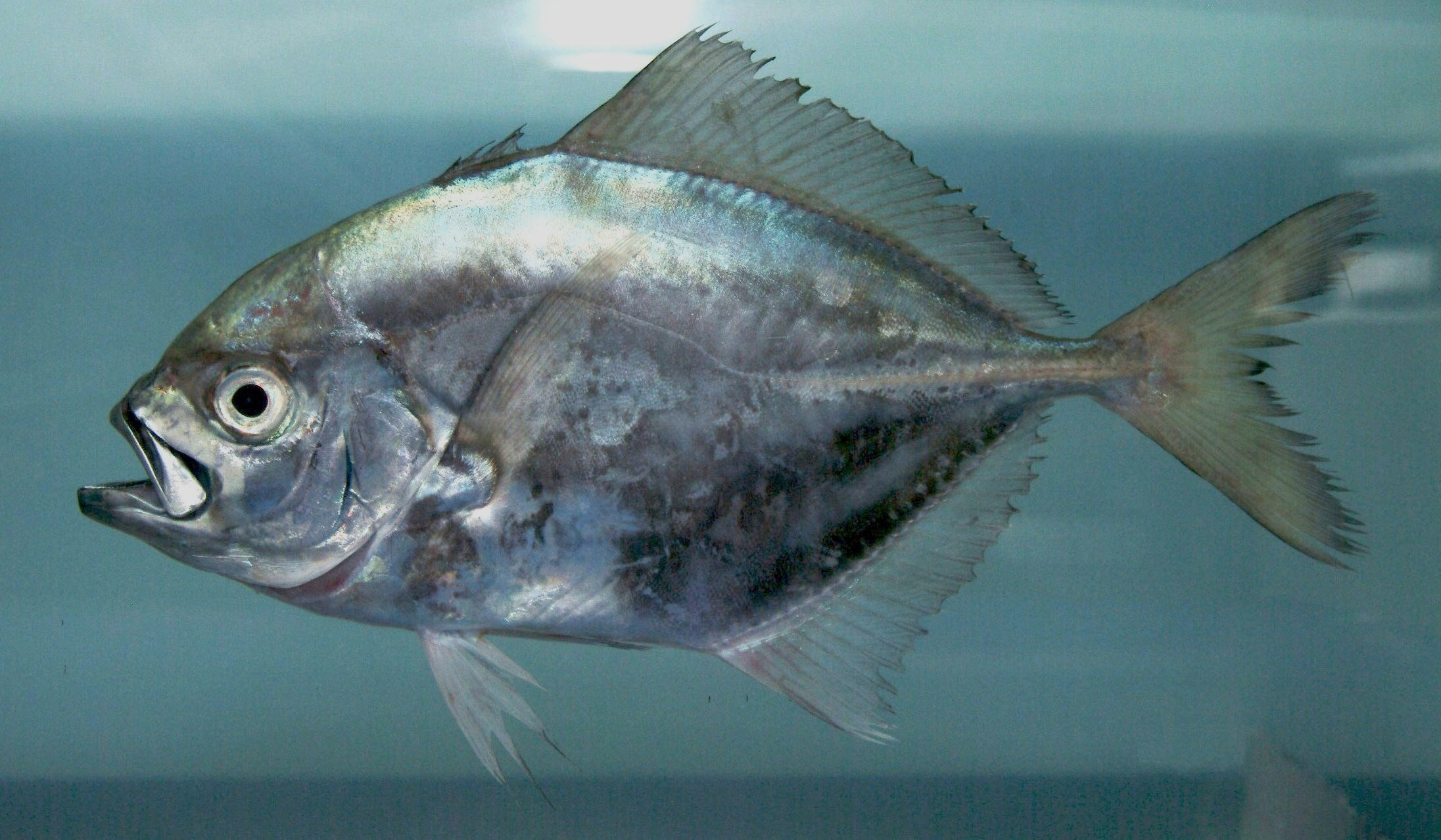

Conservation status
- Least Concern (IUCN 3.1)

Scientific classification
- Kingdom: Animalia
- Phylum: Chordata
- Class: Actinopterygii
- Order: Carangiformes
- Suborder: Carangoidei
- Family: Carangidae
- Genus: Uraspis
- Species: U. secunda

Binomial name
- Uraspis secunda (Poey, 1860)

Synonyms
- Caranx secundus Poey, 1860; Caranx hullianus McCulloch, 1909; Bassetina hullianus (McCulloch, 1909); Leucoglossa albilinguis Jordan, Evermann & Wakiya, 1927; Uraspis reversa Jordan, Evermann & Wakiya, 1927; Uraspis riukiuensis Wakiya, 1927; Uraspis heidi Fowler, 1938; Uraspis wakiyai Williams, 1961; Uraspis cadenati Blache & Rossignol, 1962

= Cottonmouth jack =

Species of fish

The cottonmouth jack (Uraspis secunda) is a gamefish in the family Carangidae. It was first described in 1860 by Cuban zoologist Felipe Poey in his two-volume work Historia Natural de la Isla de Cuba, or "Natural History of the Island of Cuba". It is also known as the cottonmouth trevally.

== Description ==
Adult cottonmouth jack are usually dark in color, while juveniles are pale with six or seven brown, vertical bars along their sides. They are named "cottonmouth" because they are distinguished from other members of their family by their bleach-white mouth and tongue. The cottonmouth jack's dorsal fin has a total of nine spines and twenty seven to thirty two soft rays. The anal fin has only three spines and nineteen to twenty three soft rays.

The longest known cottonmouth jack measured 50 cm and the greatest published weight was 2.04 kg.

== Distribution and habitat ==
The cottonmouth jack is pelagic and found throughout many oceans at depths from 1 to 36 m (3.3 to 118.1 ft). In the Western Indian Ocean, they are found off the coast of Tanzania, in the Eastern Pacific Ocean, they are known from California to Costa Rica and Hawaii. In the western Atlantic, cottonmouth jack are found off Massachusetts to Brazil. They are also known from the northern Gulf of Mexico. In the eastern Atlantic, Cottonmouth jack are known from Mauritania to Angola and have also been found off the western coast of South Africa

Cottonmouth jack usually swim throughout the water column but they are occasionally seen feeding on the bottom near islands. They do not live in large numbers and are usually seen as individuals or in small schools.

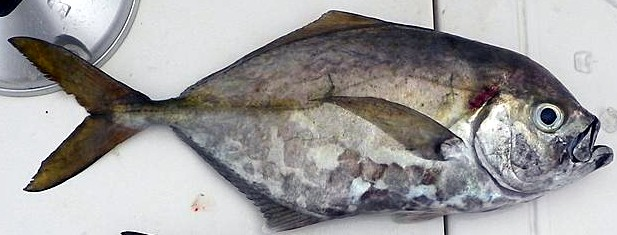
A Cottonmouth jack caught off Key West.

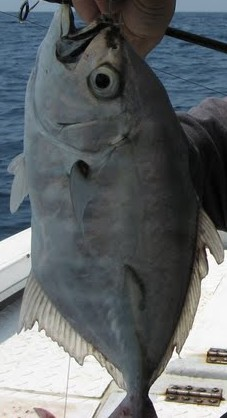
Another from off the coast of Sri Lanka.

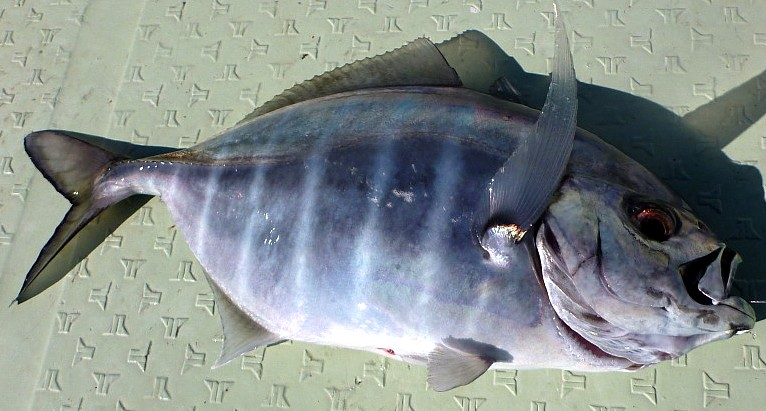
From the waters near Fiji.
