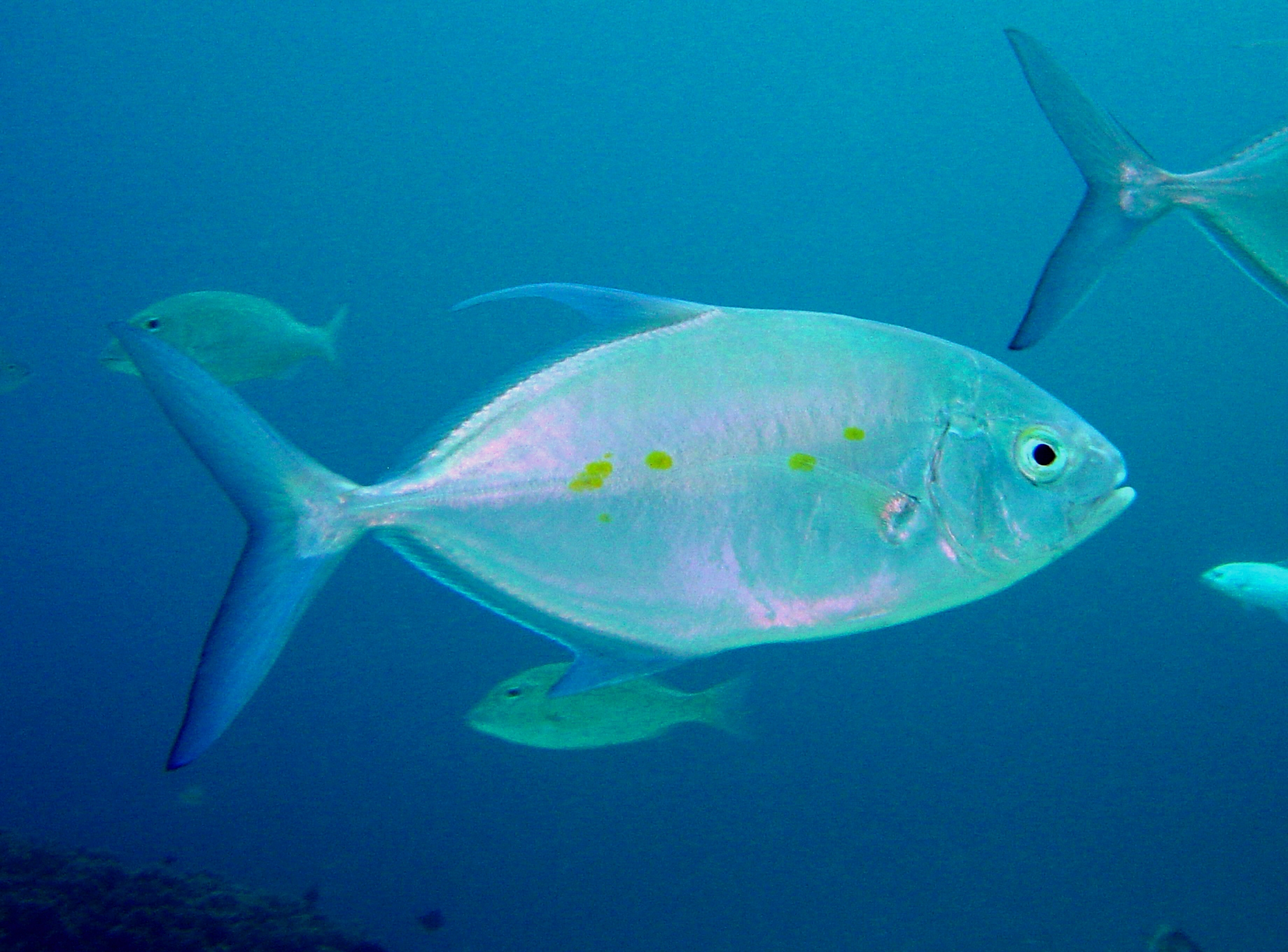

Conservation status
- Least Concern (IUCN 3.1)

Scientific classification
- Kingdom: Animalia
- Phylum: Chordata
- Class: Actinopterygii
- Order: Carangiformes
- Suborder: Carangoidei
- Family: Carangidae
- Genus: Ferdauia
- Species: F. orthogrammus

Binomial name
- Ferdauia orthogrammus (D. S. Jordan & C. H. Gilbert, 1881)
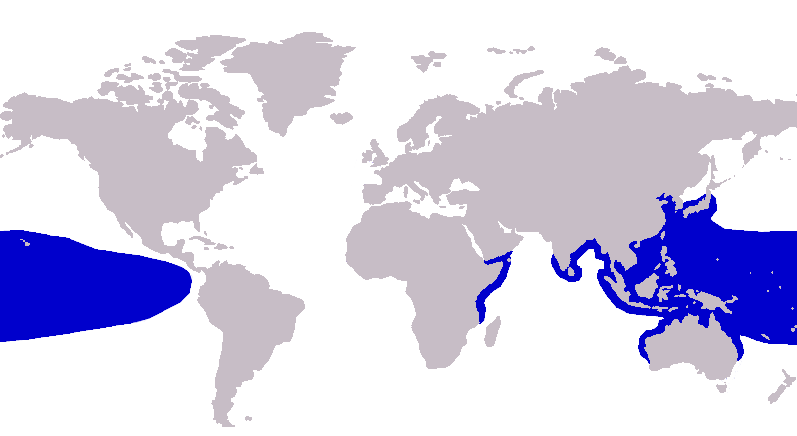
- Approximate range of the island trevally

Synonyms
- Caranx orthogrammus Jordan & Gilbert, 1882; Carangoides orthogrammus (Jordan & Gilbert, 1882); Carangoides gymnostethoides evermanni Nichols, 1921; Carangoides jordani Nichols, 1922; Carangoides ferdau jordani Nichols, 1922; Carangoides nitidus M.M. Smith, 1972

= Island trevally =

Species of ray-finned fish

The island trevally, island jack, thicklip trevally or false bluefin trevally (Ferdauia orthogrammus) is a widespread species of offshore marine ray-finned fish classified in the jack family Carangidae. The island trevally is common through the tropical regions of the Indian and Pacific Oceans, ranging from Mozambique and the Seychelles in the west to Hawaii and the Revillagigedo Islands in the central and eastern Pacific. The species is almost completely absent from the continental shelves, instead inhabiting offshore islands, where it is found in lagoons and on reef systems. It is a moderately large fish, growing to a maximum recorded length of 75 cm and 6.6 kg in weight, and is distinguishable by its angular snout and yellow spots, as well as more detailed anatomical features. The island trevally often moves in small schools, preying on a variety of small fishes and crustaceans. It is of moderate importance to fisheries throughout its range, often taken by trawls, hook-and-line, and various inshore netting methods, and is sold fresh or salted at market.

== Taxonomy and naming ==
The island trevally is classified in the genus Ferdauia together with the blue trevally (Ferdauia ferdau). Ferdauia falls into the jack and horse mackerel family Carangidae, and Carangidae is part of the order Carangiformes.

The species was first scientifically described by the American ichthyologists Jordan and Gilbert in 1881 based on a specimen taken from the Revillagigedo Islands, which was designated to be the holotype. They named this new species Caranx orthogrammus, but it was later moved to Carangoides after further revision of the family had occurred. The species was independently redescribed a number of times, with the fish placed in subspecies status twice. John Treadwell Nichols considered his C. ferdau jordani to be separate from C. orthogrammus, or possibly a subspecies of the blue trevally, C. ferdau, and was later transferred to C. jordani. It was also considered a subspecies or a synonym of the bludger, C. gymnostethoides, and was also renamed as C. nitidus. The fish is now considered a separate species, with the subspecies names and the later names rendered invalid under the ICZN naming rules. The species is commonly known as island trevally in reference to its preferred offshore habitat, with the names thicklip trevally and false bluefin trevally also used as descriptive names. The specific epithet means "straight lined" in Greek.

== Description ==
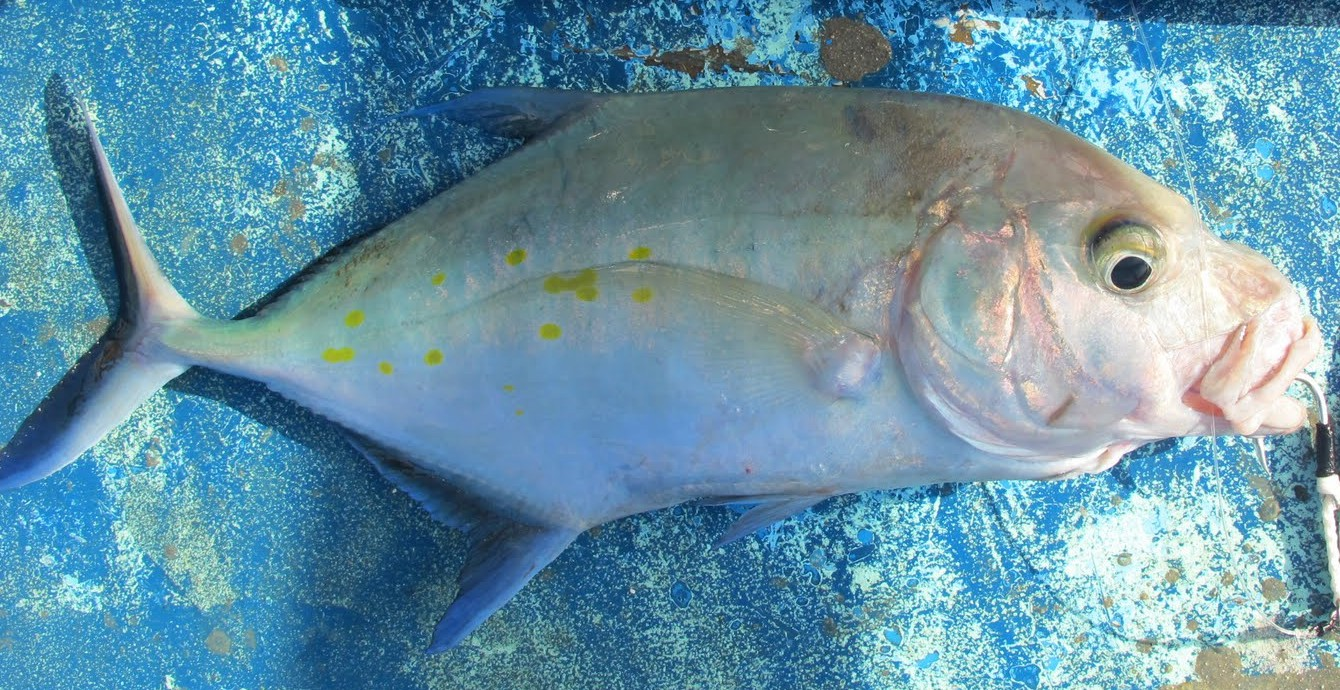
The fleshy lips of the island trevally are a distinguishing feature.

The island trevally is a moderately large fish, growing to a maximum recorded length of 75 cm and 6.61 kg in weight. The species is quite similar to F. ferdau, although the prominent yellow spots serve as a quick identifying feature. The island trevally has a compressed oblong shaped body with the dorsal profile more convex than the ventral profile and the snout usually being slightly rounded. The dorsal fin is in two sections, the first consisting of eight spines and the second of one spine and 28 to 31 soft rays, with the lobe of the second dorsal fin being slightly falcate in younger individuals, but is always shorter than the head length. The anal fin has two detached spines followed by one spine attached to 24 to 26 soft rays, while the pelvic fin has one spine attached to 21 or 22 soft rays. The lateral line has a very slight anterior arch, with the intersection of the straight and curved sections between the 15th and 19th soft rays of the dorsal fin. The curved section contains 96 to 106 scales, while the straight section contains 20 to 30 scales and 21 to 28 scutes. The breast is scaleless ventrally until the origin of pelvic fins, often with a small patch of prepelvic scales. Laterally, this naked area of the breast is separated from the naked base of the pectoral fins by a moderate band of scales. The lips are notably fleshy in adults, with both jaws containing narrow bands of villiform teeth which become obsolescent with age. There are 28 to 32 gill rakers in total and 24 vertebrae.

The island trevally is a pale blue-green above, becoming more silvery below, with adults having several quite large, elliptical, yellow to brassy spots scattered on their bodies close to the midline. Nine 9 or 10 dark vertical bars may be on the body from the head to the caudal peduncle. The soft dorsal, anal, and caudal fins are a pale brownish- to brilliant-blue, with all other fins being pale green to hyaline in colour.

== Distribution and habitat ==
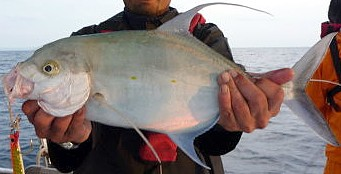
Anglers catch of island trevally

The island trevally is distributed throughout the offshore waters of the tropical and subtropical regions of the Indian and Pacific Oceans. In the Indian Ocean, it ranges from Mozambique on the east coast of Africa north to the Gulf of Aden, but has not been recorded further north until India and Sri Lanka. Its range extends throughout Southeast Asia, Indonesia, and northern Australia in the eastern Indian Ocean. In the Pacific, the species has been recorded from Taiwan, Japan, and Hawaii to the Revillagigedo Islands off Mexico in the eastern Pacific, as well as many Pacific islands.

As the species common name partly suggests, the island trevally very rarely is found on the continental shelves, instead living around offshore islands formed by volcanic activity or isolated slivers of continental material remaining from continental drifting. These islands are often quite large, and have most of the geographical features of the continental environment, including beaches, reefs, lagoons, and even estuaries. The island trevally is known from all of these habitats, as well as slightly deeper seaward reefs up to 50 m deep. In Hawaii, the species is less frequently found inside protected bays, and more often slightly further offshore presumably due to competition with other species. The island trevally is one of a number of carangid species known to be attracted to man-made fish-attracting devices, which are installed to aggregate fish for anglers.

== Biology and fishery ==
The island trevally moves both as a solitary individual or in small schools through its habitat, with the species often accounting for large proportions of an areas immediate biomass when moving in schools. The species' diet consists of small fish species and crustaceans, with studies on their exact diet composition finding these fish take different species and different ratios of prey throughout their range. A study conducted in New Caledonia found the species consumed 98% fish, with only 1% crabs and shrimp, while a large study in Hawaii found it took 64.7% crustaceans including crabs, shrimp, and stomatopods, while taking only 32.3% fish consisting of gobies and benthic fishes of the order Scorpaeniformes, as well as 2% cephalopods. In this setting, the major carangid species in the region apparently alter their diets to reduce interspecific competition, but change this partitioning elsewhere in their range where they co-occur. Reproduction and growth are poorly studied in the species, with only a general estimate of spawning timing of March in the Solomon Islands.

The island trevally is of moderate importance to fisheries throughout its range, often taken by hook and line, trawls, and various types of artisanal gear. The species is generally only caught as bycatch, with catch numbers often very small in comparison to the target species of the fishery. Throughout most of its range, catch statistics are not kept. The species is marketed fresh, dry, or salted, and is considered a good table fish.

== See also ==
- Blue trevally
