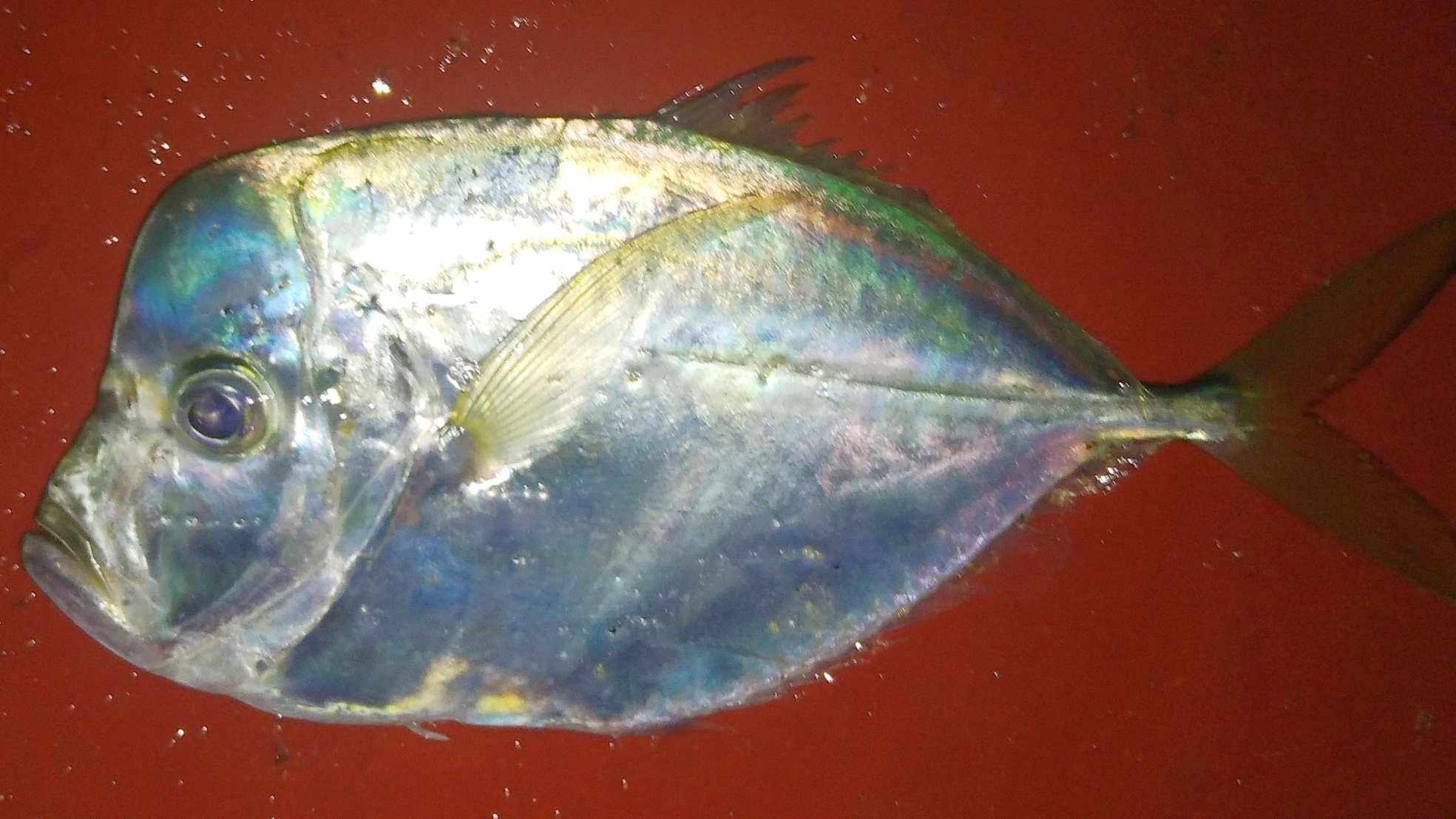

Conservation status
- Least Concern (IUCN 3.1)

Scientific classification
- Kingdom: Animalia
- Phylum: Chordata
- Class: Actinopterygii
- Order: Carangiformes
- Suborder: Carangoidei
- Family: Carangidae
- Genus: Selene
- Species: S. peruviana

Binomial name
- Selene peruviana (Guichenot, 1866)

Synonyms
- Vomer peruvianus Guichenot, 1866; Vomer declivifrons Meek & Hildebrand, 1925

= Selene peruviana =

Species of ray-finned fish

Selene peruviana, the Peruvian moonfish or Pacific moonfish, is a species of ray-finned fish in the family Carangidae. It is found in the eastern Pacific Ocean.

== Distribution and habitat ==
The Peruvian moonfish is found in the eastern Pacific Ocean. Its range extends from the southern California in the United States to central South America.

== Description ==
Adults of this species can grow up to 40 cm (16 in) TL but usually grow up to 24 cm (9.4 in) FL.
