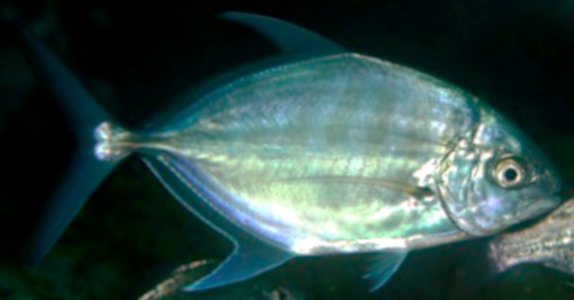

Conservation status
- Least Concern (IUCN 3.1)

Scientific classification
- Kingdom: Animalia
- Phylum: Chordata
- Class: Actinopterygii
- Order: Carangiformes
- Suborder: Carangoidei
- Family: Carangidae
- Genus: Ferdauia
- Species: F. ferdau

Binomial name
- Ferdauia ferdau (Forsskål, 1775)
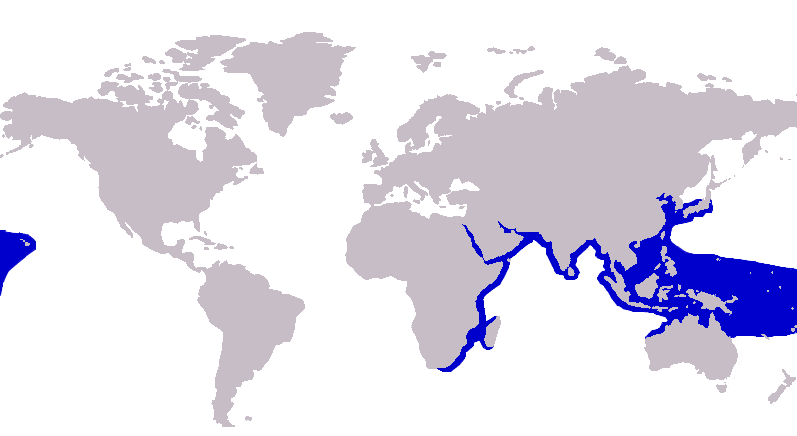
- Approximate range of the blue trevally

Synonyms
- Scomber ferdau Forsskål, 1775; Caranx ferdau (Forsskål, 1775); Carangoides ferdau (Forsskål, 1775); Carangoides hemigymnostethus Bleeker, 1851; Caranx hemigymnostethus (Bleeker, 1851); Caranx laticaudis Alleyne & Macleay, 1877; Carangoides laticaudis (Alleyne & Macleay, 1877); Caranx gilberti Jordan & Seale, 1906; Ferdauia lindemanensis Whitley, 1951

= Blue trevally =

Species of ray-finned fish

The blue trevally (Ferdauia ferdau), also known as the banded trevally, barred trevally, Ferdau's trevally or Forskaal's jackfish, is a common, widespread species of pelagic marine fish classified in the jack family, Carangidae. The blue trevally is distributed throughout the tropical and subtropical waters of the Indo-Pacific and central Pacific regions, ranging from South Africa in the west to Hawaii in the east. It is a moderately large fish, growing to a recorded maximum length of 70 cm, with the number of rays in the second dorsal fin and the colouring serving as diagnostic features of the species. The species inhabits waters to depths of 60 m, generally inhabiting reefs, beaches, lagoons, and areas with sandy substrates. It is a predatory fish, taking other fish, prawns, crabs, and molluscs, and very little is known of the species' reproductive biology. The blue trevally is of varying importance to fisheries throughout its range, with some regions having high catches of the fish. It is considered to be a gamefish, and is sought after for its excellent eating qualities.

== Taxonomy and naming ==
The blue trevally is classified within the genus Ferdauia. Ferdauia falls into the jack and horse mackerel family Carangidae, and Carangidae is part of the order Carangiformes.

The species was first described by the Swedish naturalist Peter Forsskål in 1775 based on a specimen taken from the Red Sea. He named the species Scomber ferdau, thus relating it to the mackerels before the family Carangidae was bought into existence with the creation of Lacépède's genus Caranx. With the advent of carangid taxonomy, the species was transferred first to Caranx and later to Carangoides, and is now placed in the genus Ferdauia together with the island trevally (Ferdauia orthogrammus). The species was independently described and named a number of times after its initial naming, with this and confusion with F. orthogrammus in the Indo-Pacific giving rise to a complex history of synonymies. These later names were often transferred between genera before being finally sunk into the name Ferdauia ferdau and as such are considered to be invalid junior synonyms. The specific epithet ferdau refers to a person named Ferdau, probably the collector of the holotype specimen.

== Description ==
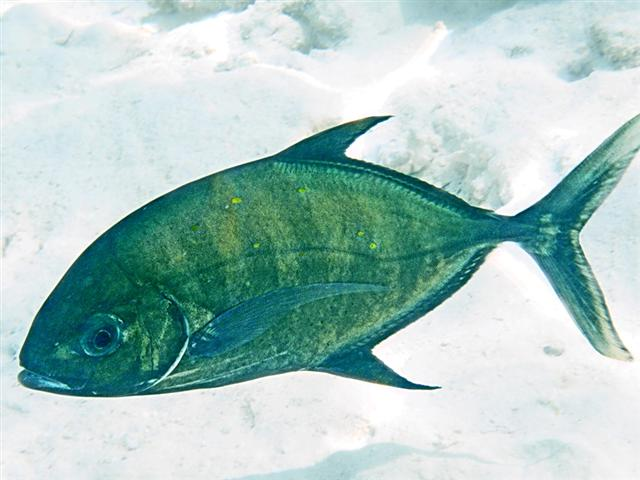
A darker-pigmented individual

The blue trevally is a moderately large fish, growing to a recorded maximum length of 70 cm and a weight of 8 kg. The species has a compressed, oblong body, with the dorsal profile more convex than the ventral profile. The snout is bluntly rounded, resembling the snouts of the pompanos of the genus Trachinotus and the lips of adults are notably fleshy. Two separate dorsal fins are found, the first having eight spines, while the second consists of one spine and 26 to 34 soft rays. In young adults, the lobe of the second dorsal fin is often falcate, but usually shorter than the head length. The anal fin has two anteriorly detached spines followed by a single spine attached to 21 to 26 soft rays, while the pelvic fin has one spine attached to 20 or 21 soft rays. The lateral line has a gentle anterior arch, with the junction of the curved and straight sections vertically below the 15th to 20th soft rays of the second dorsal fin. The curved section of the lateral line contains 82 to 90 scales, while the straight section has 12 to 17 scales and 26 to 31 scutes. The breast is naked ventrally to origin of the pelvic fins and the base of the pectoral fins, but is interrupted laterally by a moderate band of scales. The upper jaw is highly protractile, containing narrow bands of villiform teeth, which become obsolescent with age, as is the case in the lower jaw. It has a total of 24 to 29 gill rakers and 24 vertebrae.

The body is a blue-green to yellow-green above, becoming silvery below, with adults having five or six dusky vertical bands which usually persist after death. Numerous, inconspicuous golden spots often are present on the sides, mostly above the level of the pectoral fins. The soft dorsal and anal fins are pale yellowish-green, and the anterior lobes of both often have white to blue tips. The caudal fin is yellow green, having a dark trailing edge and tips, while the pelvic fins are whitish to hyaline.

== Distribution and habitat ==
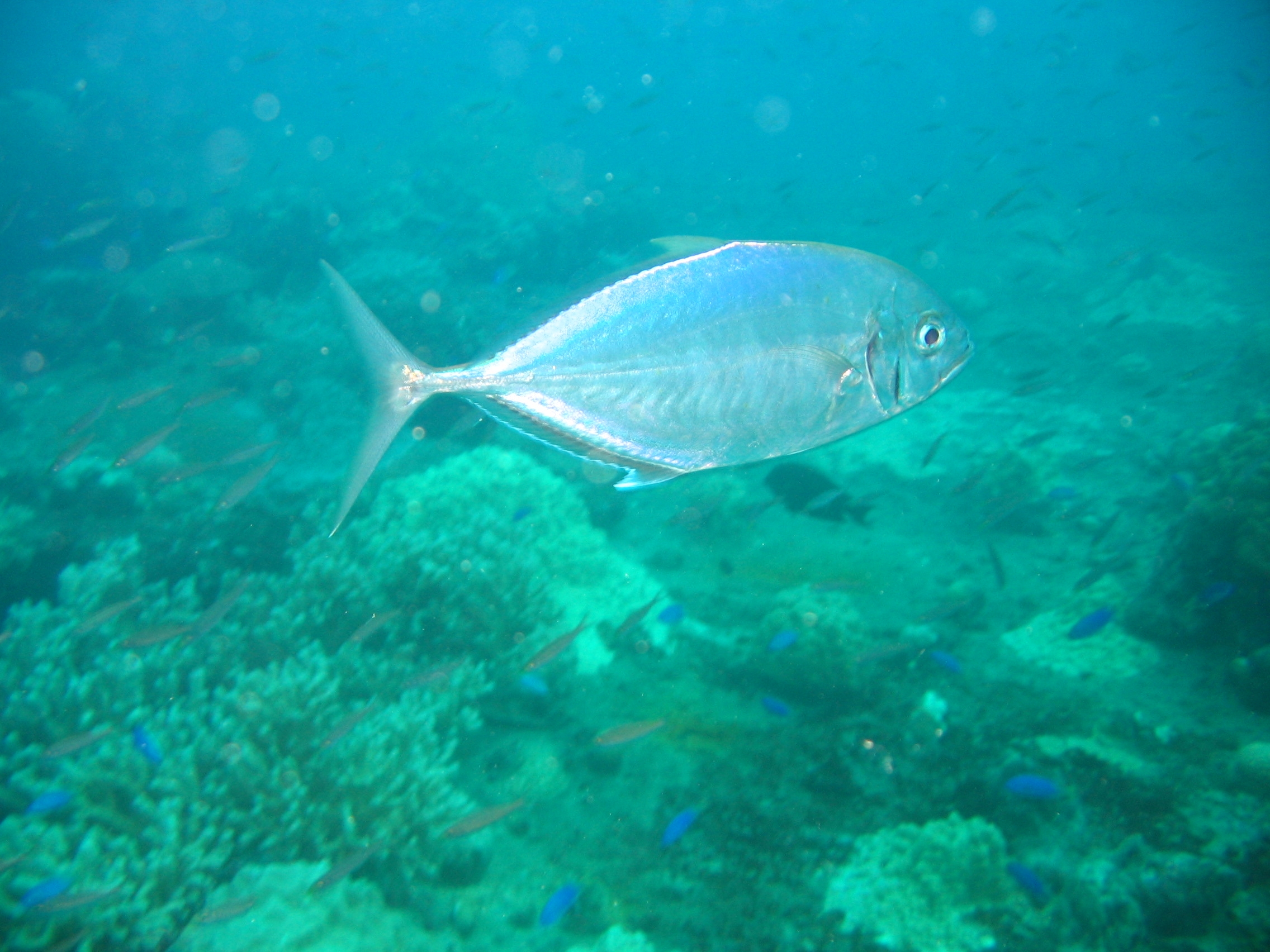
A blue trevally patrolling a Micronesian reef

The blue trevally has a wide distribution, inhabiting the tropical and subtropical waters of the Indian, West Pacific and Central Pacific Oceans. It ranges from South Africa in the west, north along the East African coast to the Red Sea and across to India and Southeast Asia. The species ranges south to Australia and Indonesia, and as far as Japan, Hawaii, and a number of Pacific islands, including Micronesia, New Caledonia, and Tonga.

The blue trevally inhabits coastal waters to a depth of 60 m, over reefs, beaches, lagoons, and areas with sandy substrates. The species lives pelagically, allowing movement between islands and atolls. It is rarely found in estuaries, suggesting a poor tolerance to low salinities.

== Biology and fishery ==
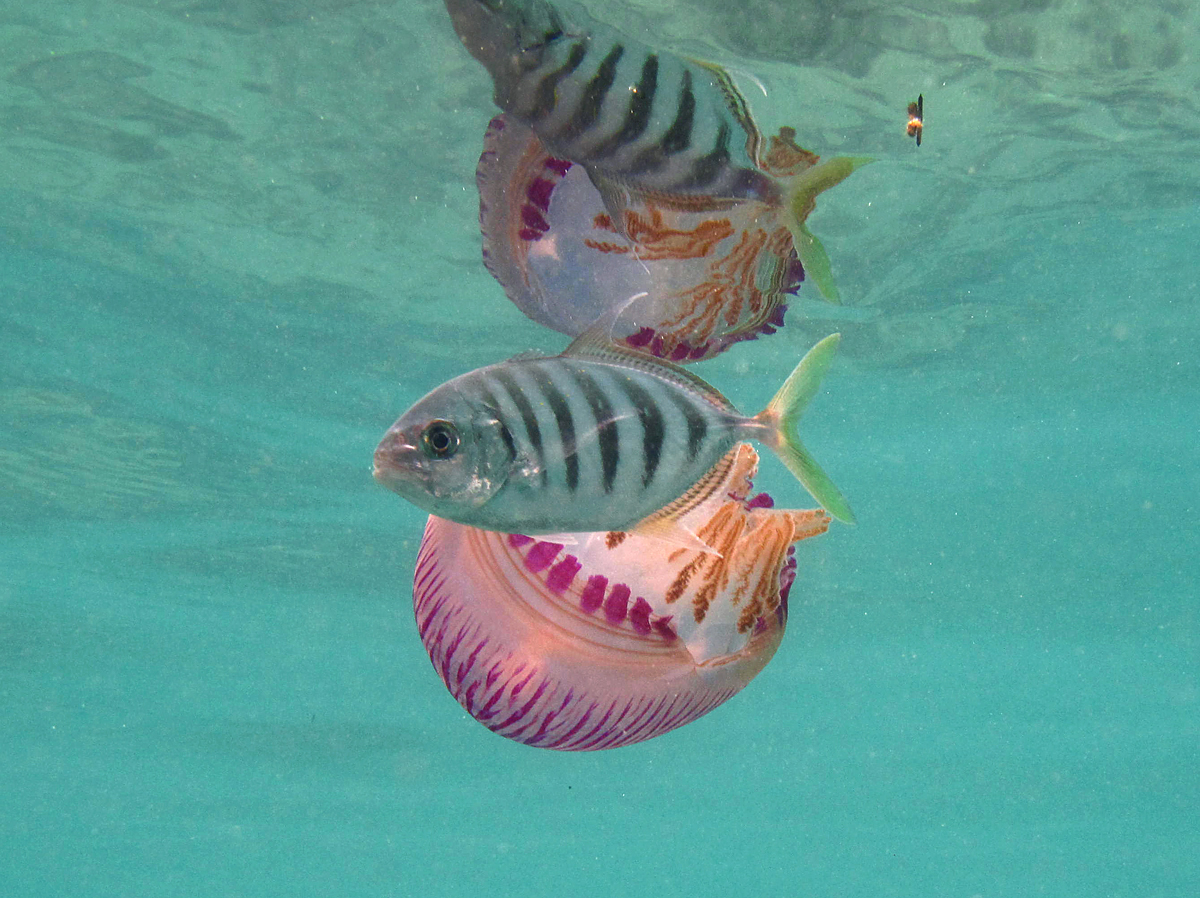
A young blue trevally with its jellyfish Thysanostoma loriferum.

Like many Indo-Pacific carangids, the biology and ecology of the blue trevally is poorly known, with the only data on the species relating to its diet. It is a fast-swimming predator which often forms small schools, and takes a variety of small fish (specifically mackerel and filefish), crustaceans including prawns, crabs, and sea lice, soft molluscs, and other soft prey. In Hawaii, they have been observed following foraging bonefish or goatfish, consuming any scraps uncovered by the foragers. The species appears to be in constant abundance all year, but ripe individuals have rarely been reported. No information regarding the reproduction and growth of the species is available, although larvae of the species are known to appear during February in the waters off Taiwan, suggesting a December spawning period, and make up a high proportion of the larval abundance. Juveniles are known to sometimes shelter among the tentacles of large pelagic jellyfish.

The species is of commercial importance in a number of areas due to its high abundance, or more often taken as bycatch in other major fisheries. Catch statistics for the individual species are rarely kept, though, and it is generally grouped with other trevallies. It is caught mainly on hook and line and with gill nets and various traps. In South Africa, it is considered a popular gamefish, and is often taken by anglers using various small baits, with the best catches had at dawn and dusk. It is considered to be an excellent table fish, although ciguatera poisoning attributed to this fish has been reported rarely.
