= Uraspis helvola =

Conservation status
- Least Concern (IUCN 3.1)

Scientific classification
- Kingdom: Animalia
- Phylum: Chordata
- Class: Actinopterygii
- Division: Teleostei
- Order: Carangiformes
- Suborder: Carangoidei
- Family: Carangidae
- Genus: Uraspis
- Species: U. helvola

Binomial name
- Uraspis helvola (J. R. Forster, 1801)

Synonyms
- Scomber helvolus Forster, 1801; Caranx helvolus (Forster, 1801); Caranx micropterus Rüppell, 1836; Leucoglossa candens Jordan, Evermann & Wakiya, 1927

Species of fish

The whitetongue jack (Uraspis helvola) is a species of jack in the family Carangidae. It is found in all tropical and subtropical oceans worldwide. Adults can grow up to 58 centimetres (23 in).

== Distribution and habitat ==
This species of fish is found in tropical and subtropical oceans worldwide. In the Atlantic Ocean, it is found in west Africa. In the Indian Ocean, its range is from the Red Sea, and the Persian Gulf south to eastern Africa, Madagascar, Seychelles, and Comoros. It is also found in western India, the Maldives, Sri Lanka, the Andaman Sea, western Sumatra, southern Indonesia, and western and southern Australia. In the Pacific Ocean, it is found off eastern Asia, around Hawaii, and New Zealand.

== Description ==
Adults can grow up to 58 centimetres (23 in) but usually grow up to 35 centimetres (14 in). This fish has 9 dorsal spines, 25 to 30 dorsal soft rays, 3 anal spines, and 19 to 22 anal soft rays.
