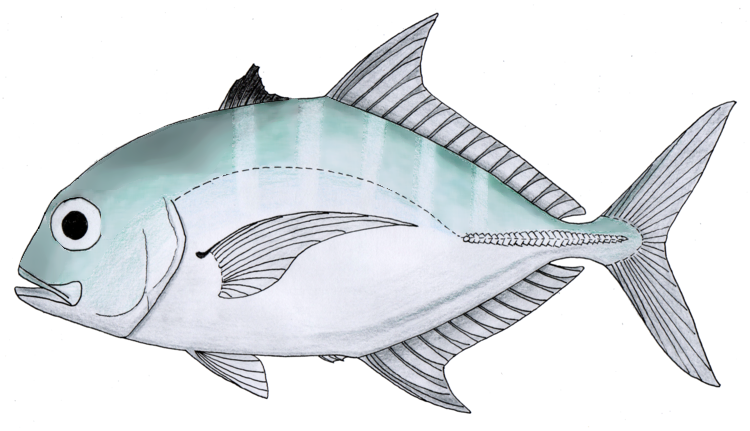

Conservation status
- Least Concern (IUCN 3.1)

Scientific classification
- Kingdom: Animalia
- Phylum: Chordata
- Class: Actinopterygii
- Order: Carangiformes
- Suborder: Carangoidei
- Family: Carangidae
- Genus: Carangichthys
- Species: C. humerosus

Binomial name
- Carangichthys humerosus (McCulloch, 1915)
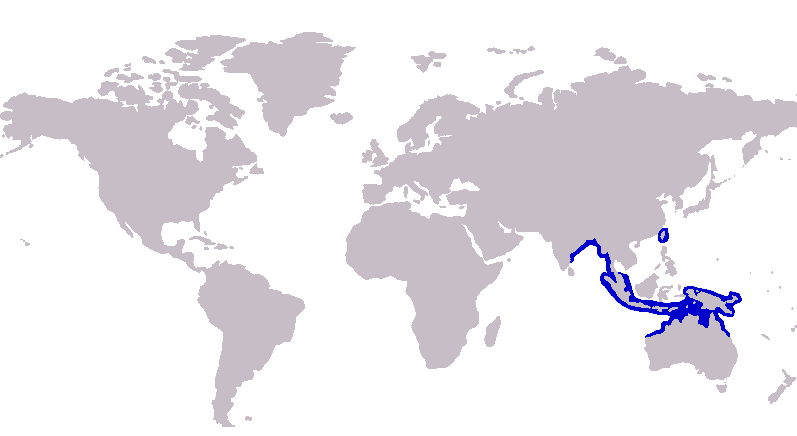
- Known range of the duskyshoulder trevally

Synonyms
- Carangoides humerosus (McCulloch, 1915); Caranx humerosus McCulloch, 1915

= Duskyshoulder trevally =

Species of ray-finned fish

The duskyshoulder trevally (Carangichthys humerosus) or epaulet trevally, is a species of small inshore marine fish in the family Carangidae. It is distributed through the eastern Indian and western Pacific Oceans, ranging from eastern India to northern Australia and Taiwan. It is relatively small by carangid standards, reaching only 27 cm maximum length, and can be distinguished by the large, black blotches on its shoulders. The duskyshoulder trevally is an inshore fish living in waters less than 50 m deep, over sandy substrates in bays and on the continental shelf. It is a predatory fish, taking demersal fishes, crustaceans, and cephalopods, with nothing known of its reproductive habits. It is of little value to fisheries, often taken as bycatch in prawn trawling operations.

== Taxonomy and naming ==
The duskyshoulder trevally is classified within the genus Carangichthys. Carangichthys falls into the jack and horse mackerel family Carangidae, and Carangidae is part of the order Carangiformes.

The species was first scientifically described by the Australian ichthyologist Allan Riverstone McCulloch in 1915 based on the holotype specimen taken from Bustard Head in Queensland, Australia. He named the species Caranx humerosus, with the specific epithet literally meaning "having shoulders" in reference to the species prominent dark shoulder colouring. The species was later transferred to the genus Carangoides, but Eschmeyer's Catalog of Fishes and FishBase now include it in Carangichthys. The species has not been redescribed under another name, which is rare amongst the Carangidae. The common name 'duskyshoulder trevally' refers to the prominent shoulder markers, as does the name 'epaulet trevally'.

== Description ==
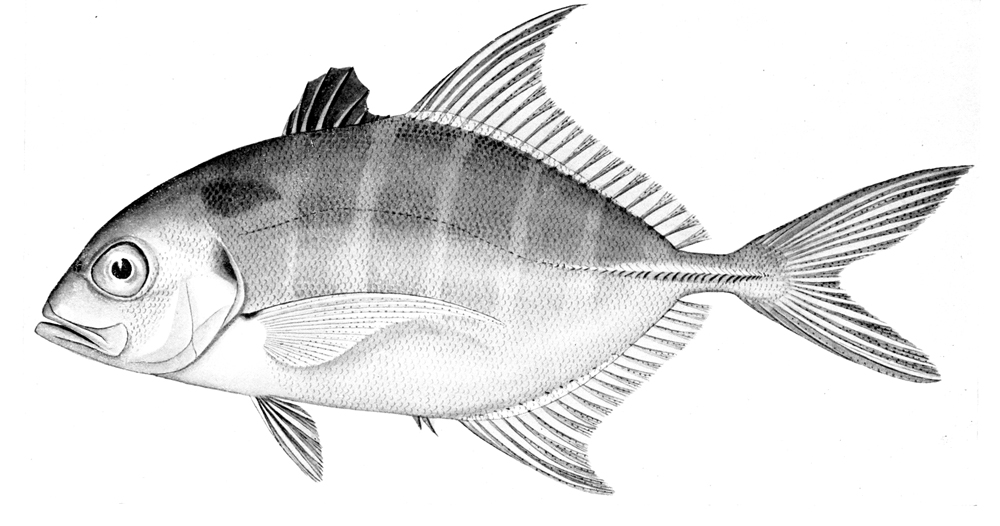
Carangoides humerosus by McCulloch

The duskyshoulder trevally is a small fish reaching only 27 cm in length. The species is similar to other jacks in its overall body profile, having a compressed ovate to oblong shape, with the dorsal profile more convex than the ventral profile. The head profile is gently sloping and slightly convex, with large males having a distinct bulge that is absent in females and juveniles of both sexes. Both of the jaws contain anteriorly widening bands of small villiform teeth, with older individuals also having a number of larger outer teeth. Two separate dorsal fins occur, the first consisting of eight spines and the second of one spine and 20 to 22 soft rays. The anal fin has two detached anterior spines, followed by one spine and 17 to 19 soft rays. The lobe of the soft dorsal fin is falcate, being about the same length as the head. The pelvic fin consists of one spine and 18 or 19 soft rays. The lateral line is moderately curved anteriorly, with the curve having 62 to 72 scales present on it, while the straight section contains three to eight scales and 24 to 32 scutes. The breast of the duskyshoulder trevally is scaleless, extending up to behind the pelvic fin origin and laterally to the pectoral fin base. It has six to 10 gill rakers on the first arch and 16 to 20 on the second arch, and the species has 24 vertebrae.

The duskyshoulder trevally is a dusky green colour above, fading to silver below, with adults and juveniles often having five or six dark broad crossbars running vertically down their bodies. A large black spot is usually present on the shoulder, with smaller dark spots on the operculum and pectoral fin axil. The soft dorsal, anal, and caudal fins are dusky, with the spinous dorsal fin black. The pectoral and pelvic fins are hyaline to white in colour.

== Distribution and habitat ==
The duskyshoulder trevally inhabits the tropical and subtropical regions of the eastern Indian Ocean and western Pacific Ocean, recorded only from the coastlines of India, Indonesia, Papua New Guinea, northern Australia, and possibly Taiwan. The species probably inhabits offshore areas of more islands in the region, but due to inadequate sampling, has not been recorded.

The species lives in waters shallower than 50 m, generally inhabiting the sandy substrates and reefs of the continental shelf, also venturing into bays and inhabiting beaches and mangrove-lined creeks.

== Biology and fishery ==
The duskyshoulder trevally is poorly studied in most aspects of its biology with the exception of its diet. It is a benthic predator, with studies in the Gulf of Carpentaria indicating it preys mostly on various species of small teleost fishes and crustaceans, with particular preference for brachyurans. Other less commonly taken prey include penaeid prawns, other crustaceans, molluscs, and cephalopods. Nothing is known of the movements or reproduction in the species.

The duskyshoulder trevally is of little importance to either commercial fisheries or anglers, but is commonly taken as bycatch in other trawl fisheries, especially the northern Australian prawn fishery. It is mostly discarded when taken, rarely sold at market.
