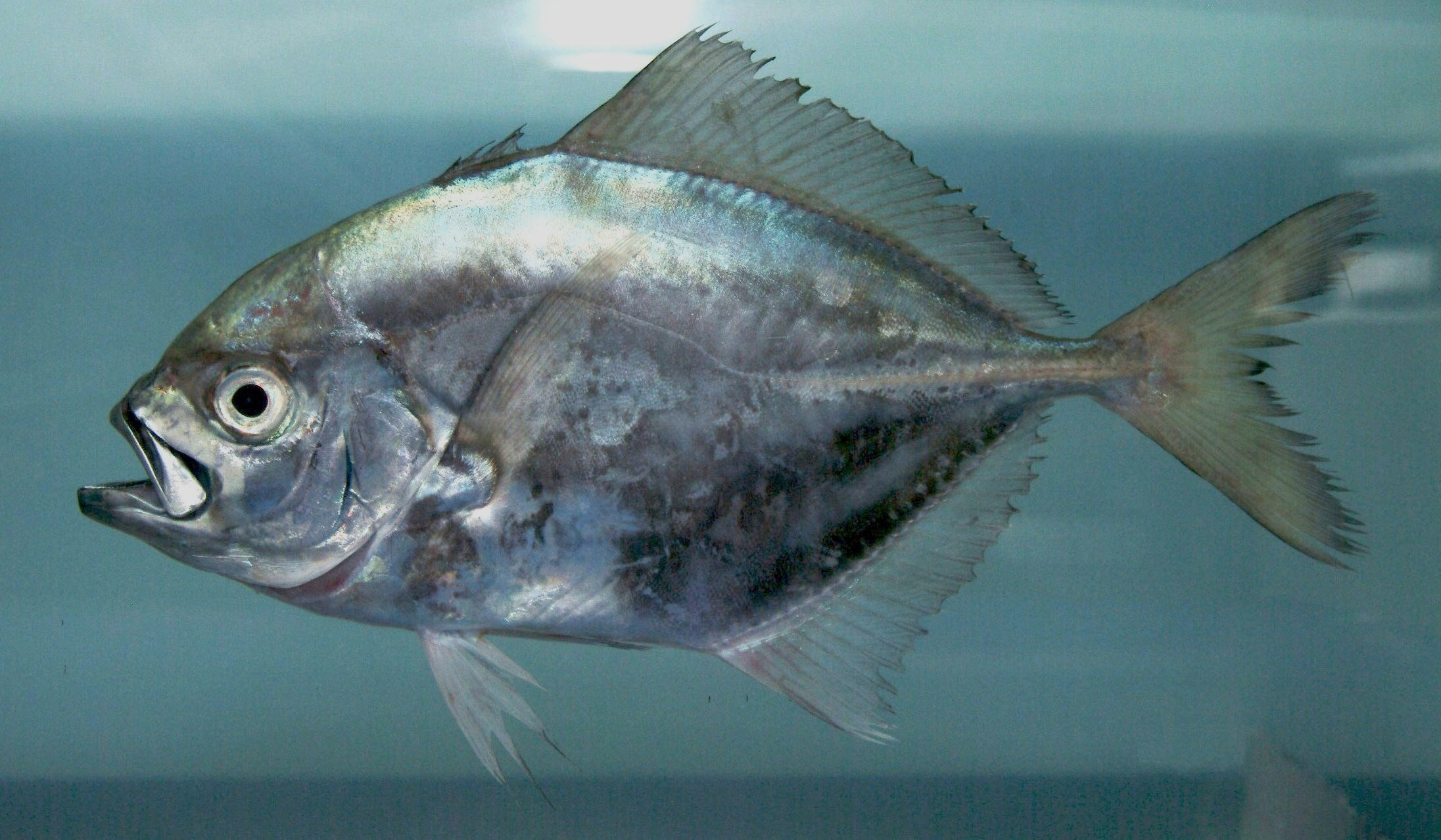
- Uraspis secunda

Scientific classification
- Kingdom: Animalia
- Phylum: Chordata
- Class: Actinopterygii
- Order: Carangiformes
- Suborder: Carangoidei
- Family: Carangidae
- Subfamily: Caranginae
- Genus: Uraspis (Bleeker, 1855)

Type species
- Uraspis carangoides (Bleeker, 1855)

Synonyms
- Bassetina Whitley, 1941; Leucoglossa Jordan & Evermann, 1927; Platyuraspis Fowler, 1938; Zamora Whitley, 1931

= Uraspis =

Genus of fishes

Uraspis is a genus of jacks.

== Species ==
The currently recognized species in this genus are:

Image	Scientific name	Common name	Distribution
	Uraspis helvola (J. R. Forster, 1801)	whitetongue jack	Atlantic Ocean, it is found in west Africa. In the Indian Ocean, its range is from the Red Sea, and the Persian Gulf south to eastern Africa, Madagascar, Seychelles, and Comoros. It is also found in western India, the Maldives, Sri Lanka, the Andaman Sea, western Sumatra, southern Indonesia, and western and southern Australia. In the Pacific Ocean, it is found off eastern Asia, around Hawaii, and New Zealand.
	Uraspis secunda (Poey, 1860)	cottonmouth jack	Western Indian Ocean, they are found off the coast of Tanzania, in the Eastern Pacific Ocean, they are known from California to Costa Rica and Hawaii.
	Uraspis uraspis (Günther, 1860)	whitemouth jack	the Red Sea and the Persian Gulf to Sri Lanka in the Indian Ocean, and from the Philippines to the Ryukyu Islands in Japan and east towards Hawaii.
