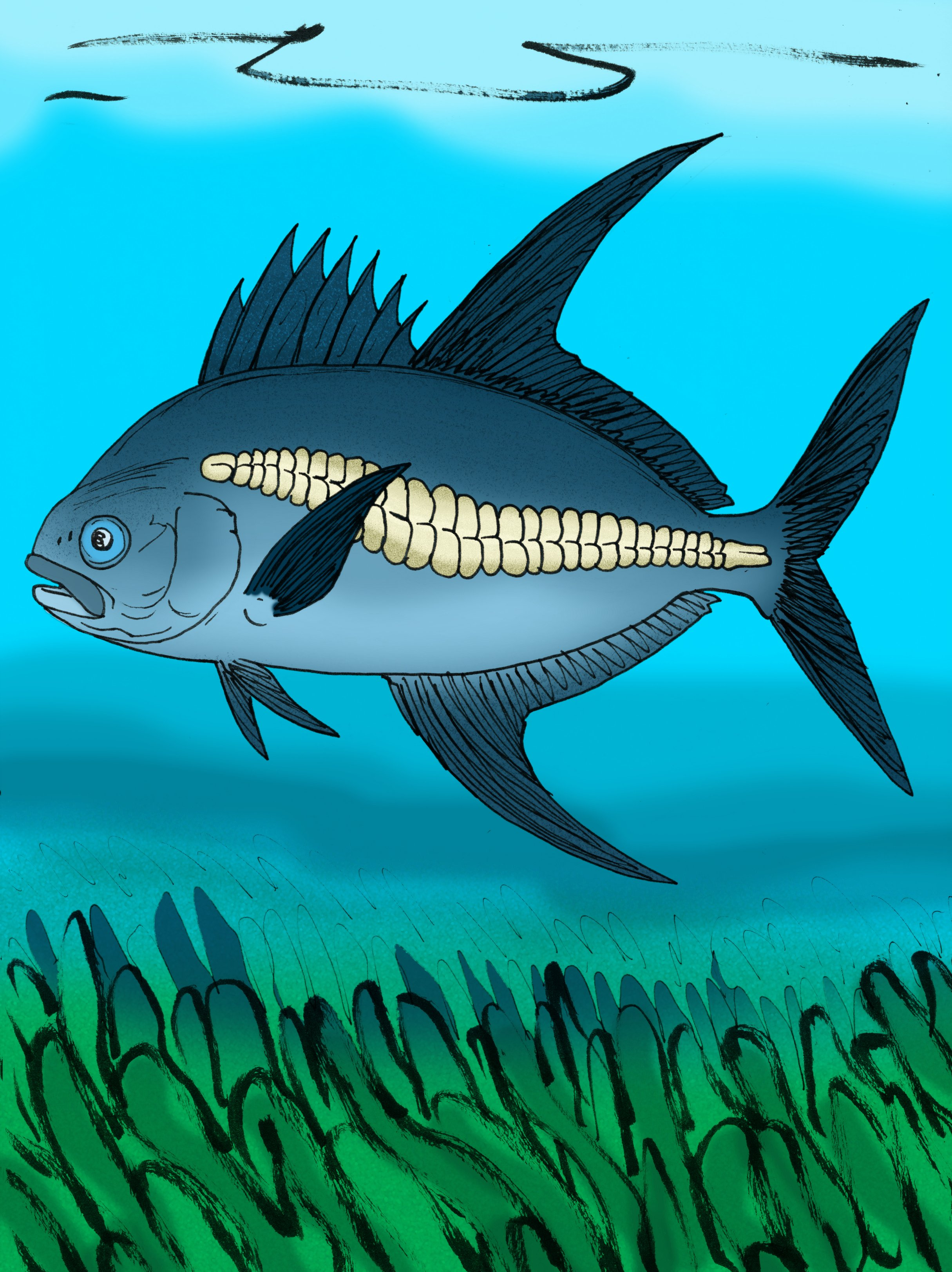
- Restoration of Eothynnus salmoneus as a carangid

Scientific classification
- Kingdom: Animalia
- Phylum: Chordata
- Class: Actinopterygii
- Order: Carangiformes
- Suborder: Carangoidei
- Family: Carangidae
- Genus: †Eothynnus; Woodward, 1901
- Species: †E. salmoneus

Binomial name
- †Eothynnus salmoneus Woodward, 1901

= Eothynnus =

Eothynnus Temporal range: Ypresian

Extinct species of fish

Eothynnus is an extinct species of prehistoric jackfish that lived during the lower Eocene of Europe and eastern North America. It contains a single species, E. salmoneus. It is known primarily from some preserved skulls from what is now the Isle of Sheppey (as a part of the London Clay Lagerstatten) in England. A single vertebra is also known from the Nanjemoy Formation of Virginia, US.

It was originally thought to be a tuna or mackerel, hence the generic name translating as "dawn" or "Eocene tuna." Later, it was reappraised to be a jackfish, related to Teratichthys and Eastmanalepes (syn. "Caranx primaevus"). It is one of the largest fish known from the London Clay.
