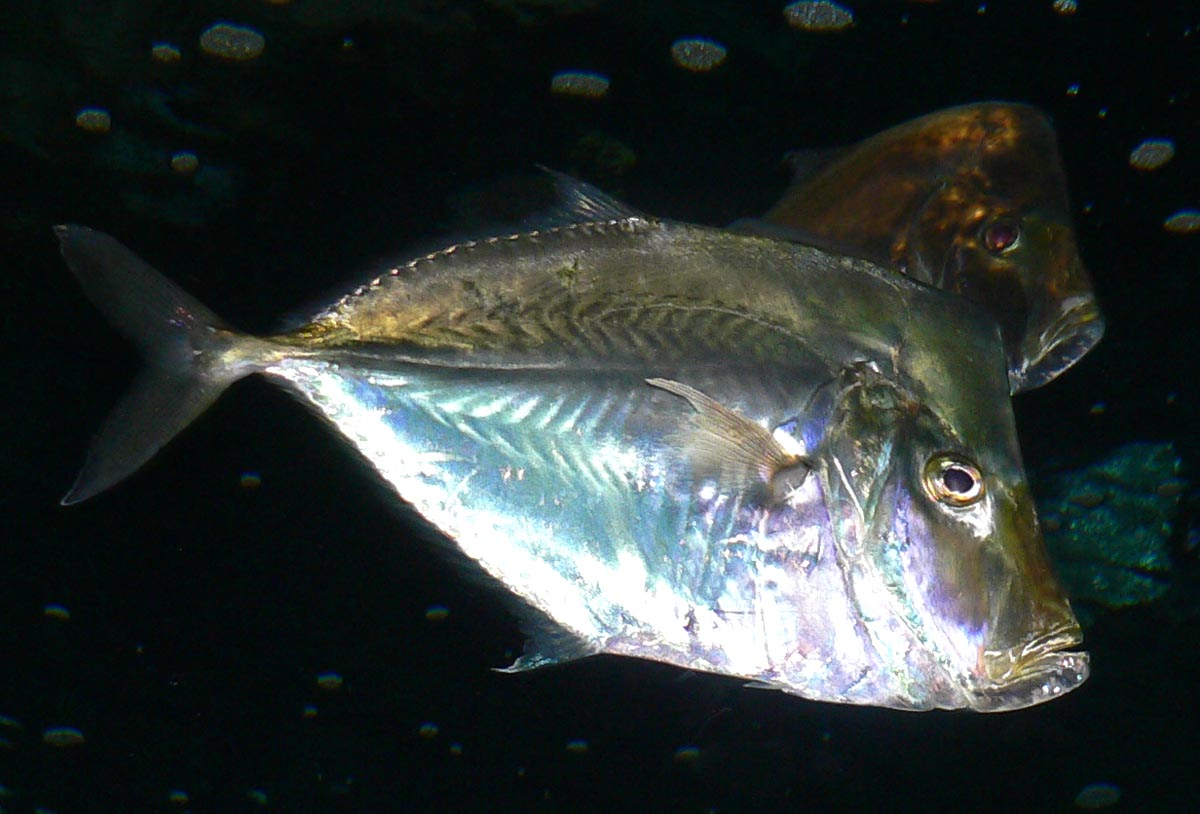
- Lookdown (S. vomer)
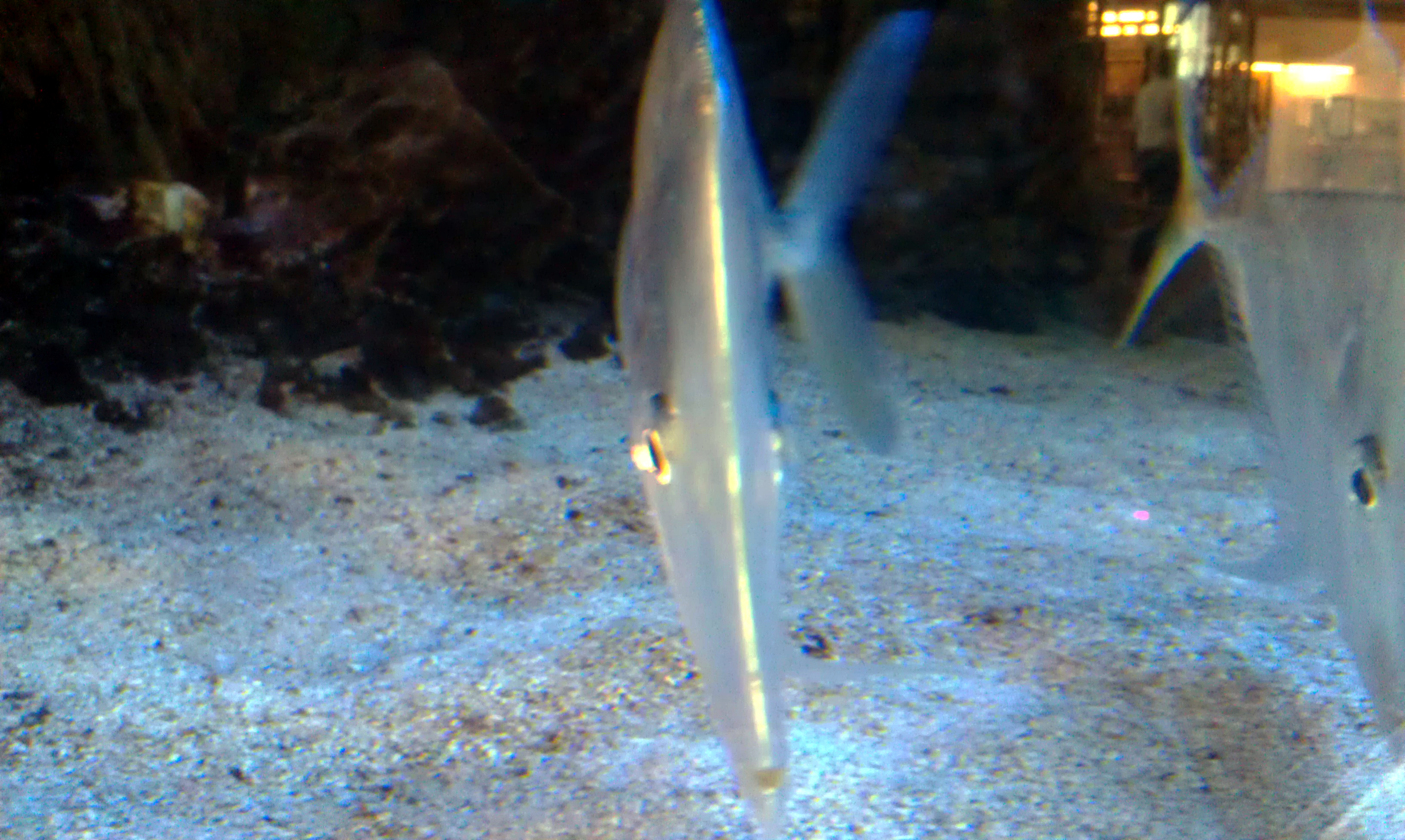
- Hairfin lookdown (S. brevoorti), frontal view

Scientific classification
- Kingdom: Animalia
- Phylum: Chordata
- Class: Actinopterygii
- Division: Teleostei
- Order: Carangiformes
- Suborder: Carangoidei
- Family: Carangidae
- Subfamily: Caranginae
- Genus: Selene; Lacépède, 1802

Type species
- Selene argentea Lacépède, 1802

Synonyms
- Argyreiosus Lacepède, 1802; Platysomus Swainson, 1839; Vomer Cuvier, 1816

= Selene (fish) =

Genus of ray-finned fishes

Selene is a genus of carangids, commonly known as lookdowns and moonfishes, native to the Atlantic Ocean and the eastern Pacific Ocean.

== Species ==
There are currently seven recognized species in this genus. The Mexican moonfish was formerly included here as well, but is now placed in the genus Paraselene.

Image	Scientific name	Common name	Distribution
	Selene brevoortii (T. N. Gill, 1863)	Hairfin lookdown	East Pacific where it is found from southernmost California, United States to northern Peru (occasionally south as far as Chile).
	Selene brownii (G. Cuvier, 1816)	Caribbean moonfish	Western Atlantic: continental shelf from Mexico to Colombia and Brazil, and from Cuba to Guadeloupe.
	Selene dorsalis (T. N. Gill, 1863)	African moonfish	Eastern Atlantic: Portugal to South Africa, including Madeira and Cape Verde
	Selene peruviana (Guichenot, 1866)	Peruvian moonfish	southern California in the United States to central South America.
	Selene setapinnis (Mitchill, 1815)	Atlantic moonfish	Western Atlantic: Nova Scotia, Canada, along coasts of Gulf of Mexico and South America, Argentina.
	Selene spixii (Castelnau, 1855)		Mexico to Espirito Santo, Brazil.
	Selene vomer (Linnaeus, 1758)	Lookdown	Canada and Maine south to Uruguay, including Bermuda and the Gulf of Mexico.
