= Carangichthys =

Scientific classification
- Kingdom: Animalia
- Phylum: Chordata
- Class: Actinopterygii
- Order: Carangiformes
- Suborder: Carangoidei
- Family: Carangidae
- Subfamily: Caranginae
- Genus: Carangichthys; Bleeker, 1853

Species
- See text

Genus of ray-finned fishes

Carangichthys is a genus of ray-finned fish in the family Carangidae. Its members were previously included in the genus Carangoides.

== Species ==
The currently recognized species in this genus are:

Image	Scientific name	Common name	Distribution
	Carangichthys dinema (Bleeker, 1851)	shadow trevally	the Indian and west Pacific Oceans, from South Africa in the west to Japan and Samoa in the east, reaching as far south as Indonesia and New Caledonia.
	Carangichthys humerosus (McCulloch, 1915)	duskyshoulder trevally	eastern Indian and western Pacific Oceans, ranging from eastern India to northern Australia and Taiwan.
	Carangichthys oblongus (Cuvier, 1833)	coachwhip trevally	Indo-west Pacific region, ranging from South Africa in the west to Fiji and Japan in the east
