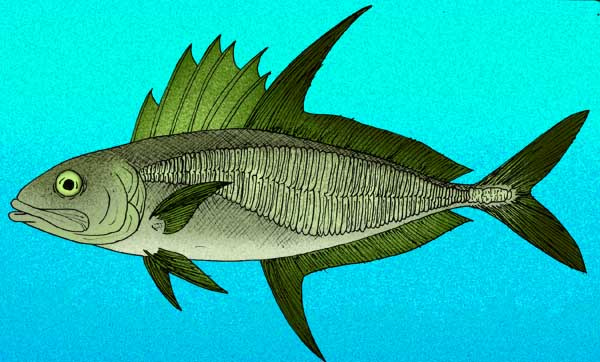
- E. primaevus

Scientific classification
- Kingdom: Animalia
- Phylum: Chordata
- Class: Actinopterygii
- Order: Carangiformes
- Suborder: Carangoidei
- Family: Carangidae
- Genus: †Eastmanalepes; Bannikov, 1984
- Species: †E. primaevus

Binomial name
- †Eastmanalepes primaevus (Eastman, 1904)

Synonyms
- Caranx primaevus Eastman, 1904

= Eastmanalepes =

Eastmanalepes Temporal range: Early Eocene

Extinct species of fish

Eastmanalepes (meaning "Eastman's scale) is an extinct genus of prehistoric jackfish known from the Eocene of Europe. It contains a single species, E. primaevus, known from the late Ypresian of the Monte Bolca site in Italy. It was originally described as a species of the jackfish genus Caranx, which it has a superficially similar outline to. However, it differs from Caranx, and almost all other jackfish, in that it has very large, very pronounced scutes along its lateral line. According to Bannikov, E. primaevus is probably more related to the extinct jackfish genera, Eothynnus and Teratichthys.

== See also ==
- Prehistoric fish
- List of prehistoric bony fish
