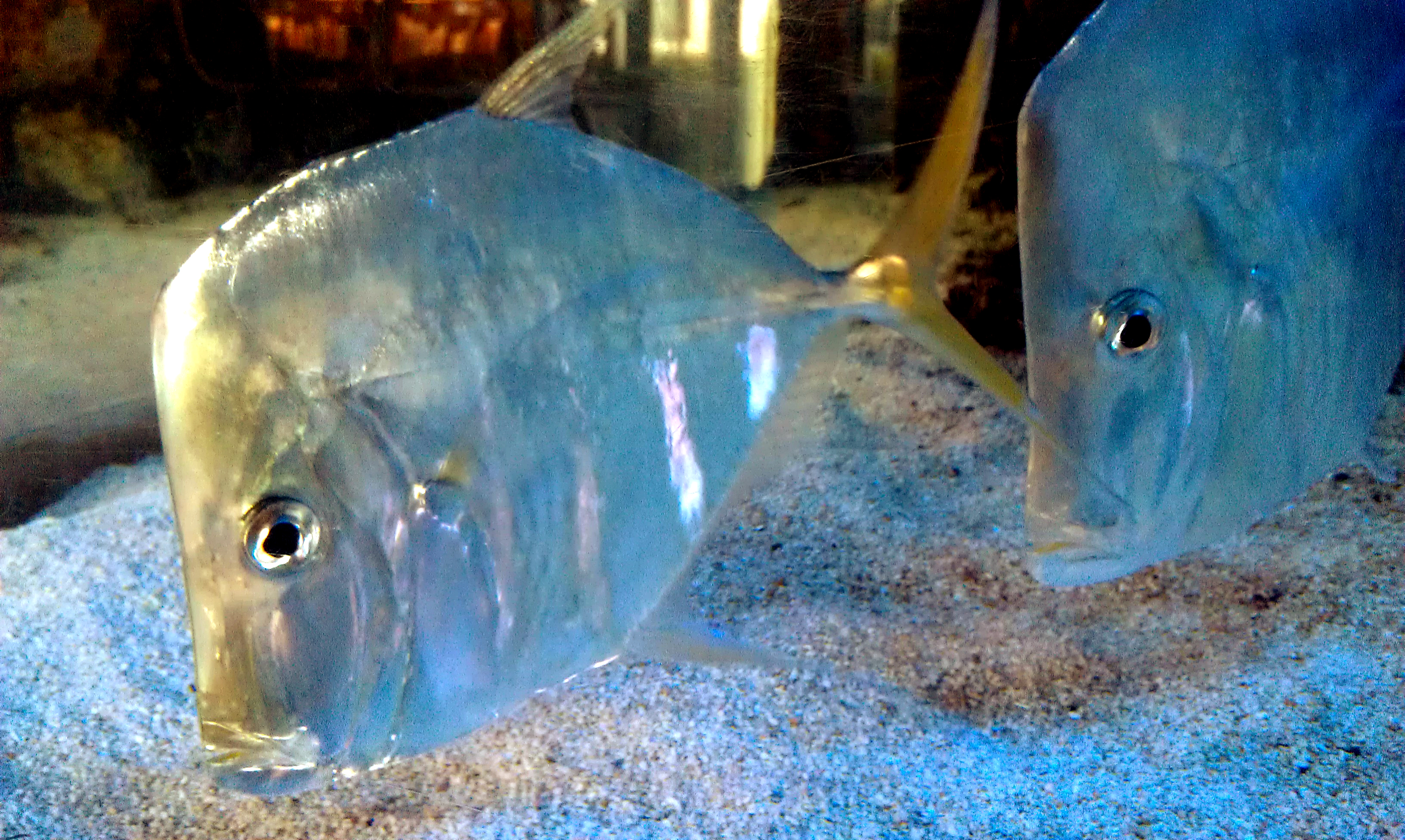
- Swimming in an aquarium
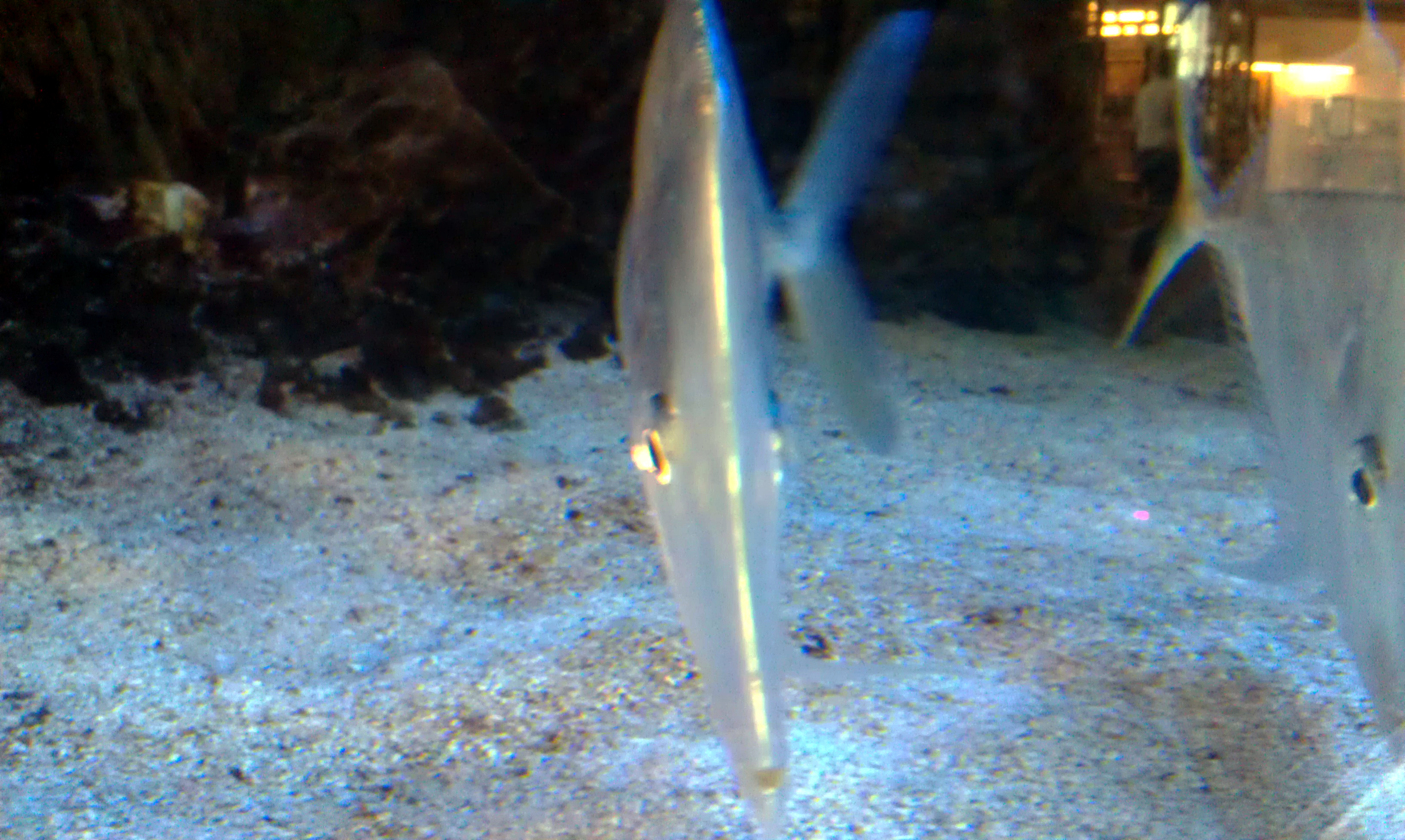
- Frontal view

Conservation status
- Least Concern (IUCN 3.1)

Scientific classification
- Kingdom: Animalia
- Phylum: Chordata
- Class: Actinopterygii
- Order: Carangiformes
- Suborder: Carangoidei
- Family: Carangidae
- Genus: Selene
- Species: S. brevoortii

Binomial name
- Selene brevoortii (T. N. Gill, 1863)

Synonyms
- Argyriosus brevoortii Gill, 1863; Vomer brevoortii (Gill, 1863); Argyreiosus pacificus Lockington, 1877; Vomer pacificus (Lockington, 1877)

= Selene brevoortii =

Species of fish

Selene brevoortii, the hairfin look down, also known as the airfin lookdown, Mexican lookdown or Pacific lookdown, is a species of carangid fish native to warmer parts of the East Pacific where it is found from southernmost California, United States to northern Peru (occasionally south as far as Chile). This species is generally found close to the coast at depths of less than 50 m (160 ft). They grow to 38 cm (15 in) in fork length. It is of minor importance to local commercial fisheries, but is popular as a gamefish. Its specific name honours the American book collector, numismatist, amateur naturalist and friend of Theodore N. Gills J. Carson Brevoort (1817-1887) for his interest in the fishes of the family Carangidae.
