= Ferdauia =

Scientific classification
- Kingdom: Animalia
- Phylum: Chordata
- Class: Actinopterygii
- Order: Carangiformes
- Suborder: Carangoidei
- Family: Carangidae
- Subfamily: Caranginae
- Genus: Ferdauia; Jordan et al., 1927

Species
- See text

Genus of ray-finned fishes

Ferdauia is a genus of ray-finned fish in the family Carangidae. Its members were previously included in the genus Carangoides.

== Species ==
The currently recognized species in this genus are:

Image	Scientific name	Common name	Distribution
	Ferdauia ferdau (Fabricius, 1775)	blue trevally	Indo-Pacific and central Pacific regions, ranging from South Africa in the west to Hawaii in the east.
	Ferdauia orthogrammus (D. S. Jordan & C. H. Gilbert, 1882)	island trevally	Indian and Pacific Oceans, ranging from Mozambique and the Seychelles in the west to Hawaii and the Revillagigedo Islands in the central and eastern Pacific
