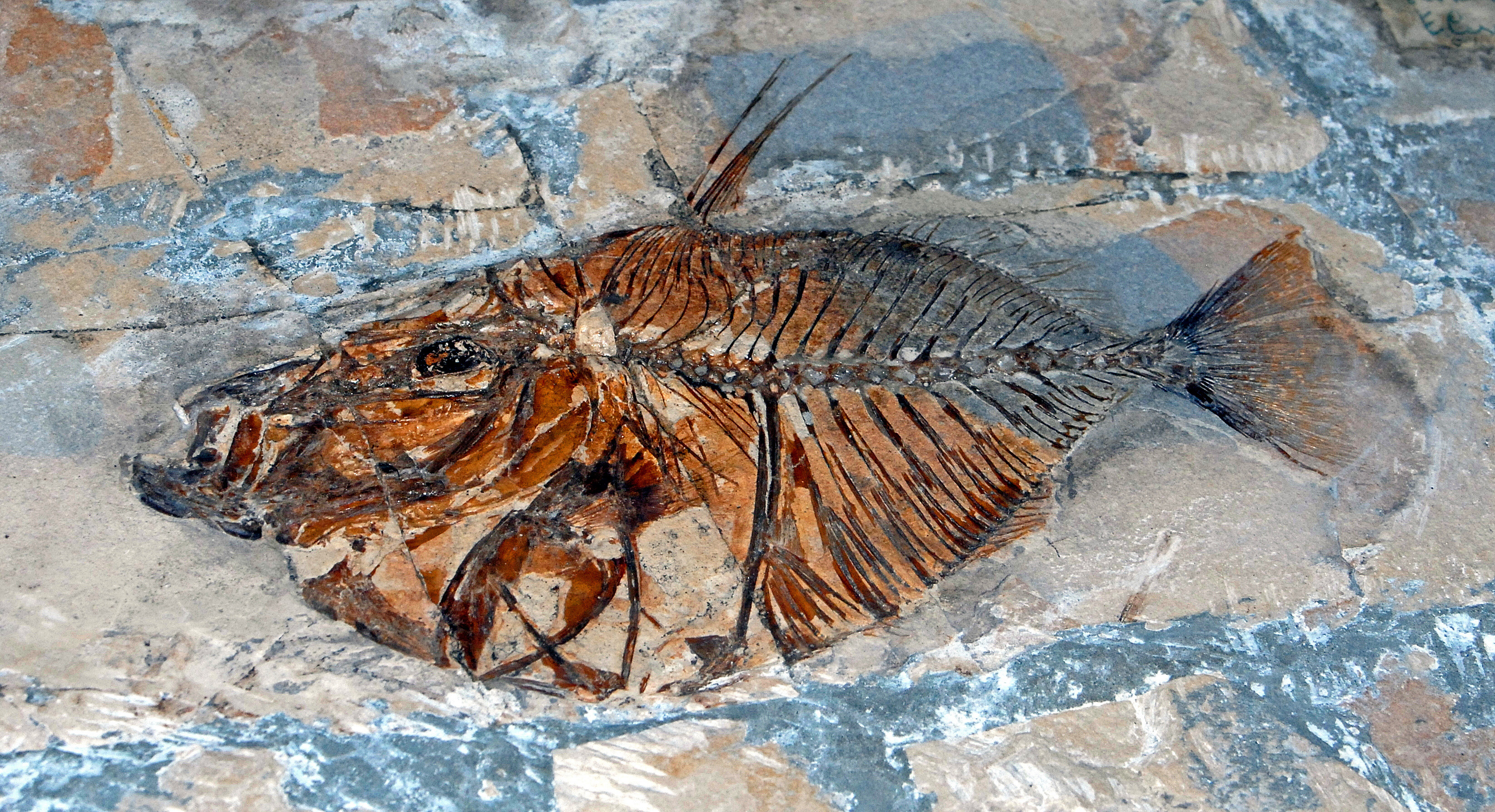
- Vomeropsis triurus at the Museo Civico di Storia Naturale di Milano

Scientific classification
- Kingdom: Animalia
- Phylum: Chordata
- Class: Actinopterygii
- Division: Teleostei
- Order: Perciformes
- Genus: †Vomeropsis; Heckel, 1853

= Vomeropsis =

Vomeropsis Temporal range: Early- Middle Eocene

Extinct genus of fishes

Vomeropsis is an extinct genus of prehistoric jack fish that lived from the early to middle Eocene.
