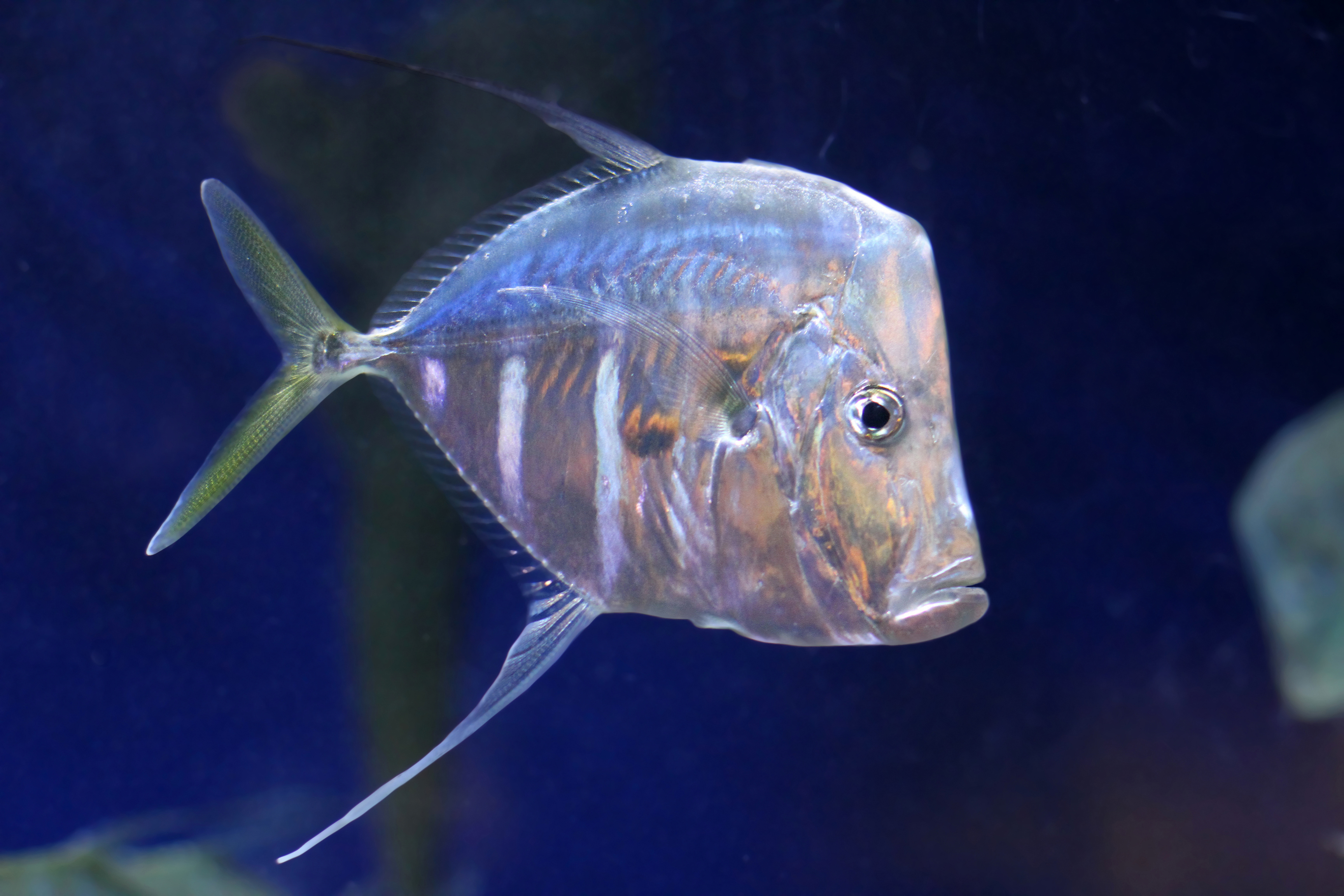

Conservation status
- Least Concern (IUCN 3.1)

Scientific classification
- Kingdom: Animalia
- Phylum: Chordata
- Class: Actinopterygii
- Order: Carangiformes
- Suborder: Carangoidei
- Family: Carangidae
- Genus: Selene
- Species: S. vomer

Binomial name
- Selene vomer (Linnaeus, 1758)

Synonyms
- List: Zeus vomer Linnaeus, 1758; Zeus gallus Linnaeus, 1758; Zeus kleinii Walbaum 1792; Selene argentea Lacépède, 1802; Zeus capillaris Mitchill, 1815; Zeus rostratus Mitchill, 1815; Zeus geometricus Mitchill, 1818; Argyriosus mauriceii Swainson, 1839; Argyriosus setifer Swainson, 1839; Platysomus (Argyriosus) riacanthus Swainson, 1839; Zeus columba Larrañaga, 1923; Zeus rhomboides Larrañaga, 1923

= Lookdown =

Species of fish

The lookdown (Selene vomer) is a species of game fish in the family Carangidae. It was first described in 1758 by Carl Linnaeus, in the 10th edition of Systema Naturae.

== Description ==
Although the lookdown is similar to the Atlantic moonfish, it can be distinguished by its dorsal and anal fins, the second ray on each fin being many times longer than the surrounding rays. This gives the dorsal and anal fins a noticeably scythe-like shape. The dorsal fin of the lookdown has 9 spines and 23 rays, while the anal fin has only 3 spines and 18 rays.

Like the Atlantic moonfish, it has a deep, rhombus-shaped, laterally-compressed body. The head has the mouth set low and the eyes high. The overall profile of the head is concave. The caudal fin is forked, as in the pompanos, while the pectoral fin is scythe-like and reaches the middle of the second dorsal fin.

The lookdown is silvery on both sides with a darker tinge on top. A young fish has several faint vertical bars that fade as it grows. The longest lookdown known was 48.3 cm (19.0 in) long, and the heaviest weighed 2.1 kilograms (4.6 lb).

== Distribution and habitat ==
In the western Atlantic, the lookdown is found from Canada and Maine south to Uruguay, including Bermuda and the Gulf of Mexico. Although it is common in tropical Atlantic waters, it is rarely seen in the Greater Antilles.

The lookdown is found in marine and brackish waters at depths of 1 to 53 meters (3.3 to 170 ft). It lives in shallow water near the coast, along hard or sandy bottoms. Juveniles may be seen in estuaries or near sandy beaches. The lookdown often shoals, but it may also break away into smaller groups or pairs.

== Commercial importance ==
The lookdown does not play a significant role in commercial fisheries. However, it is sought after for large public aquarium displays due to its interesting shape and flashy appearance.

== Gallery ==
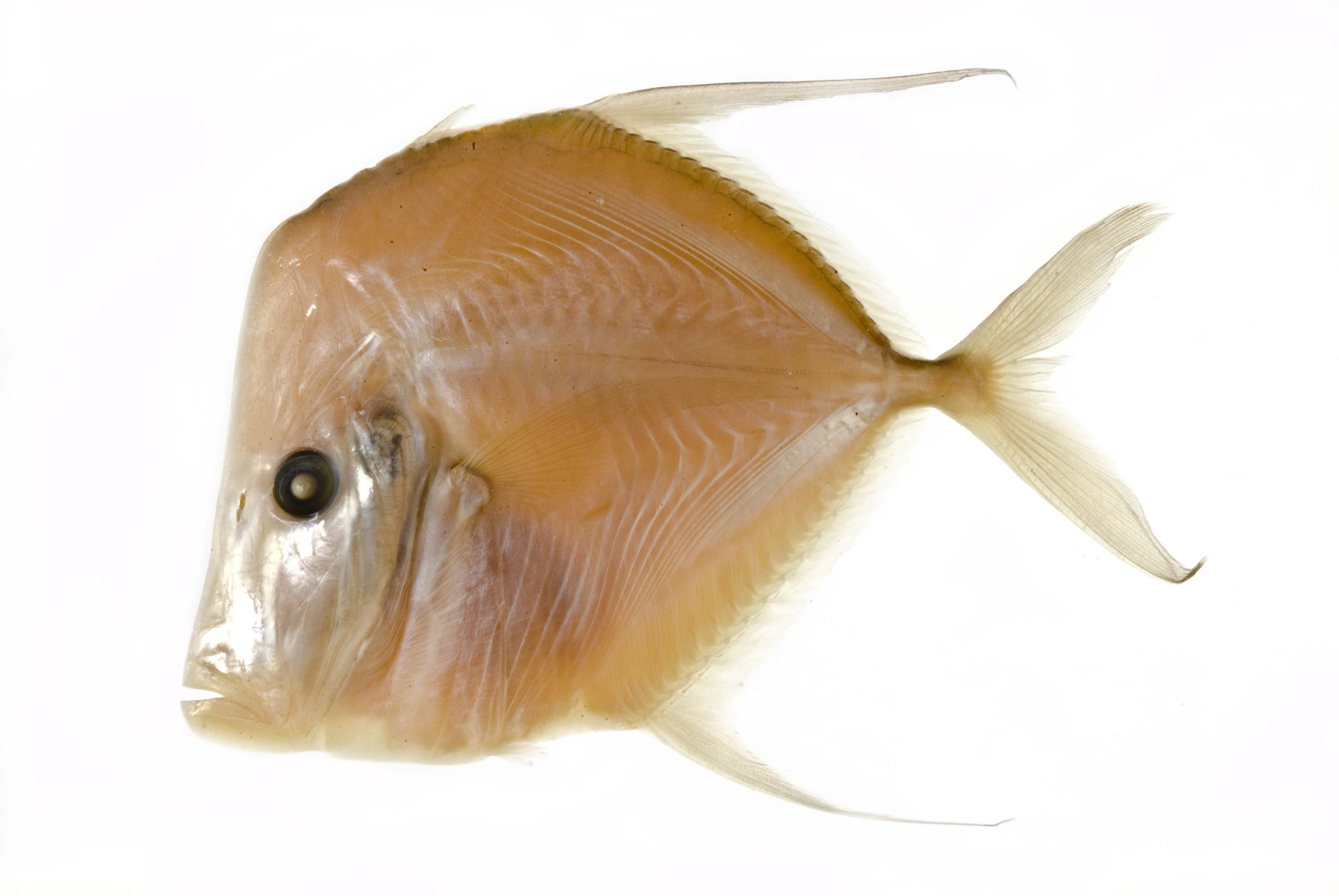

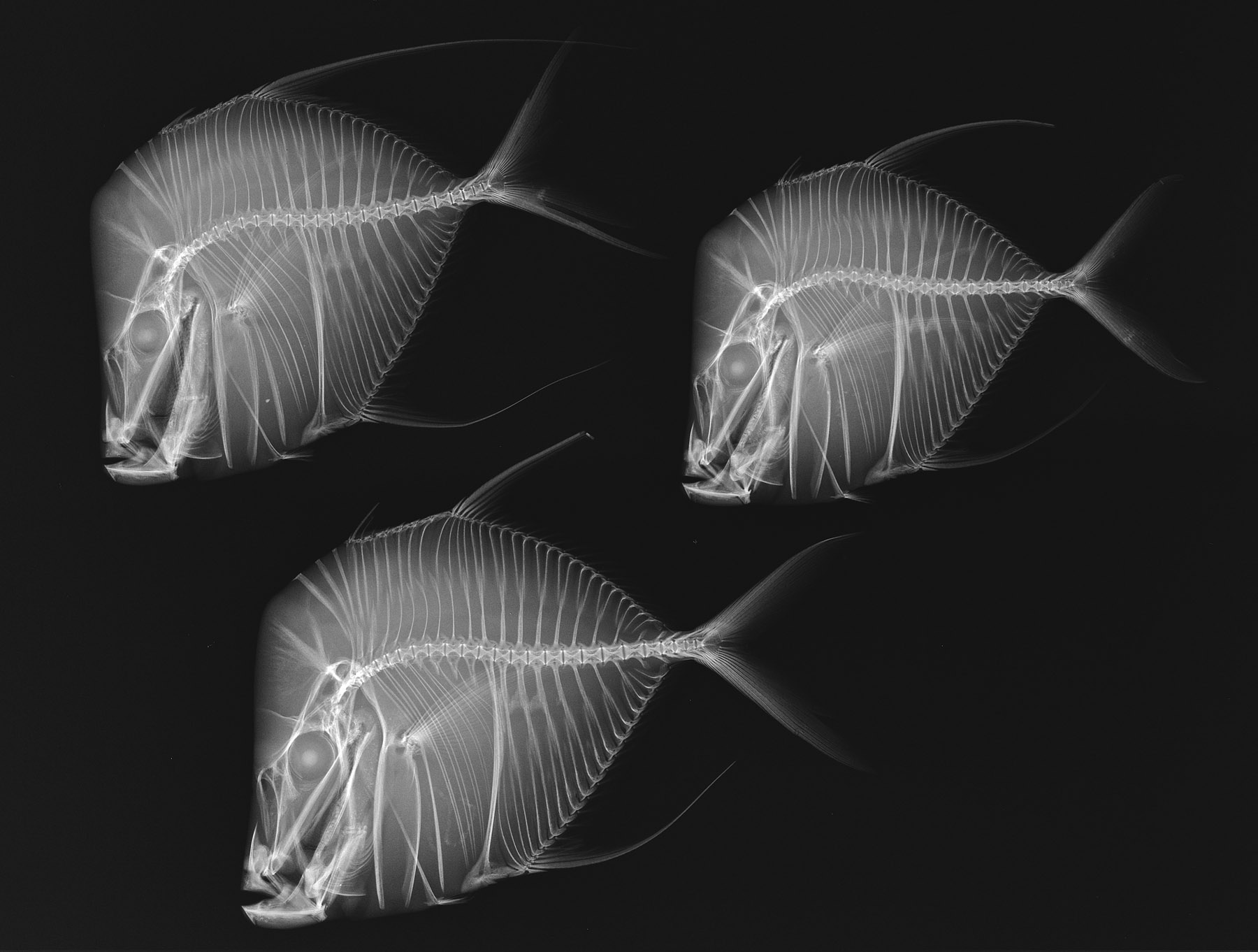
X-ray image

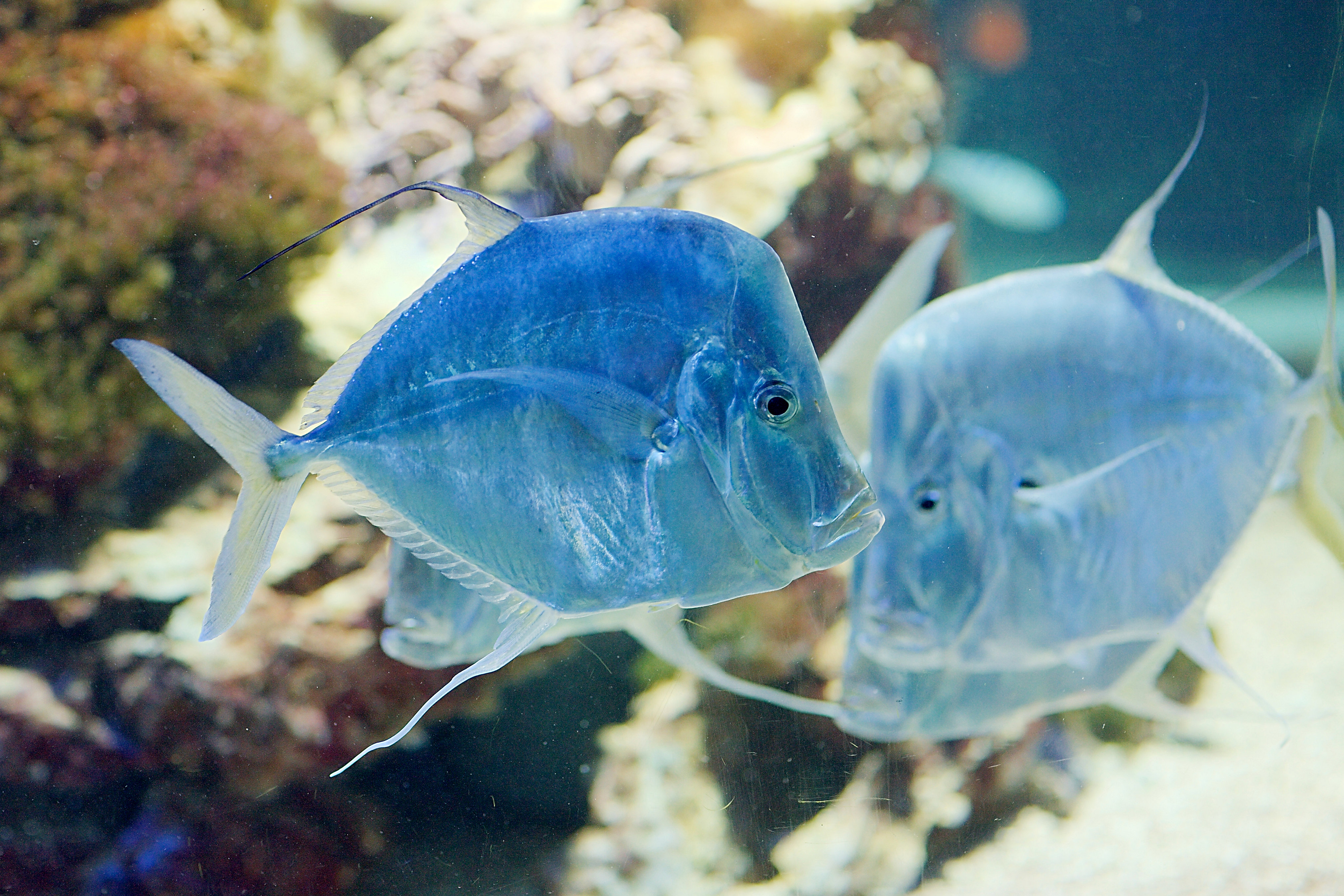

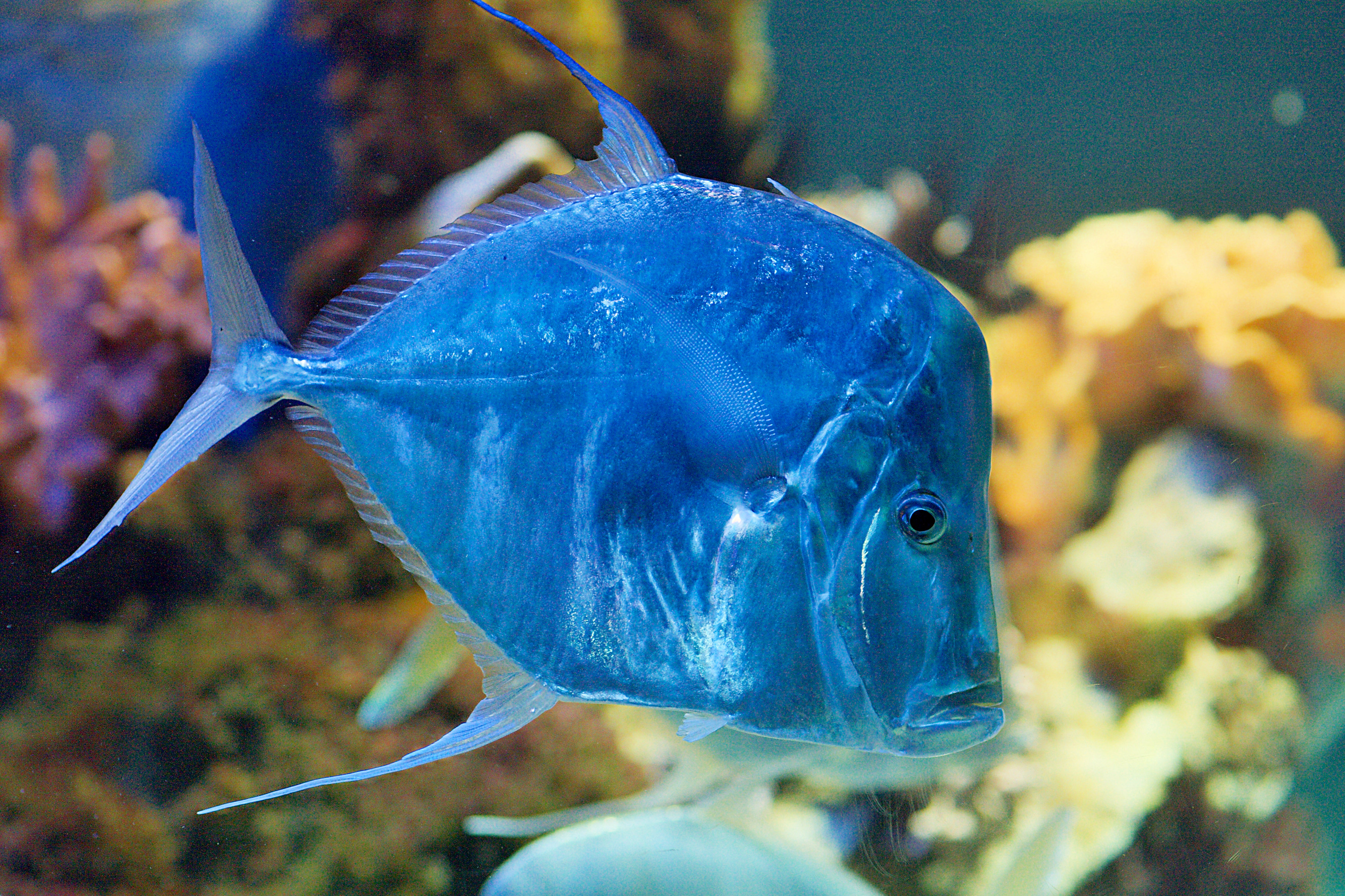

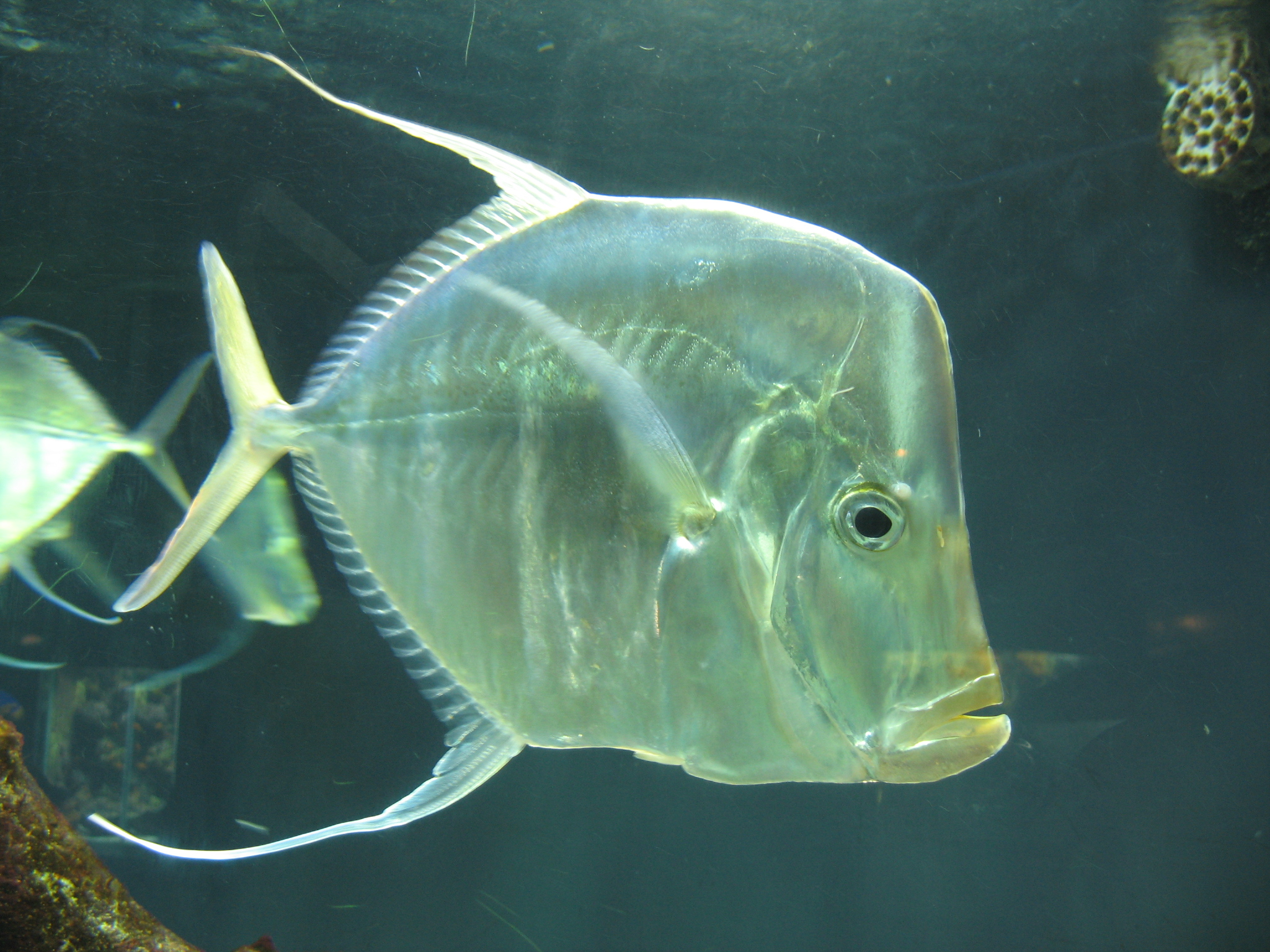

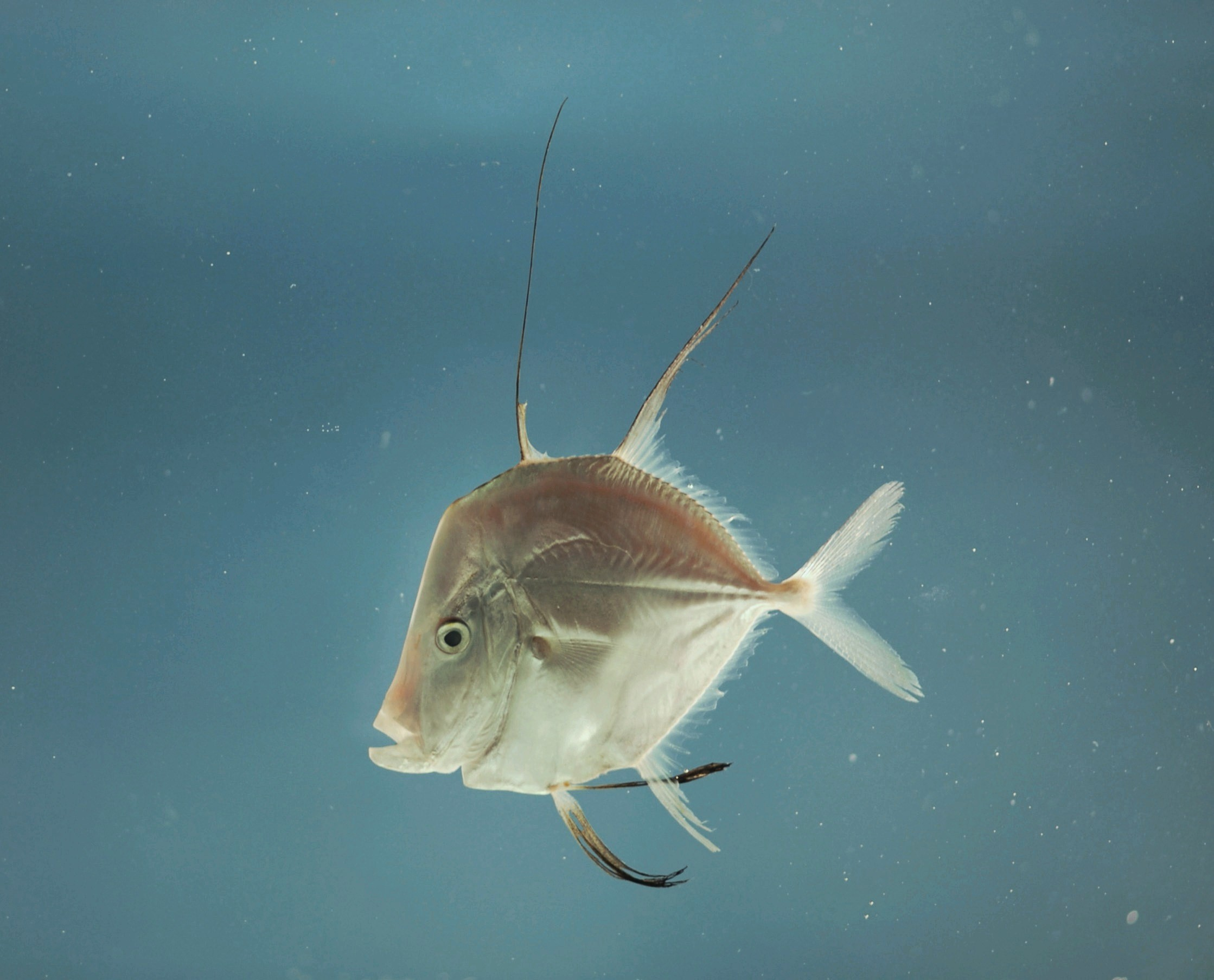
A naturally occurring Lookdown, in the Gulf of Mexico
