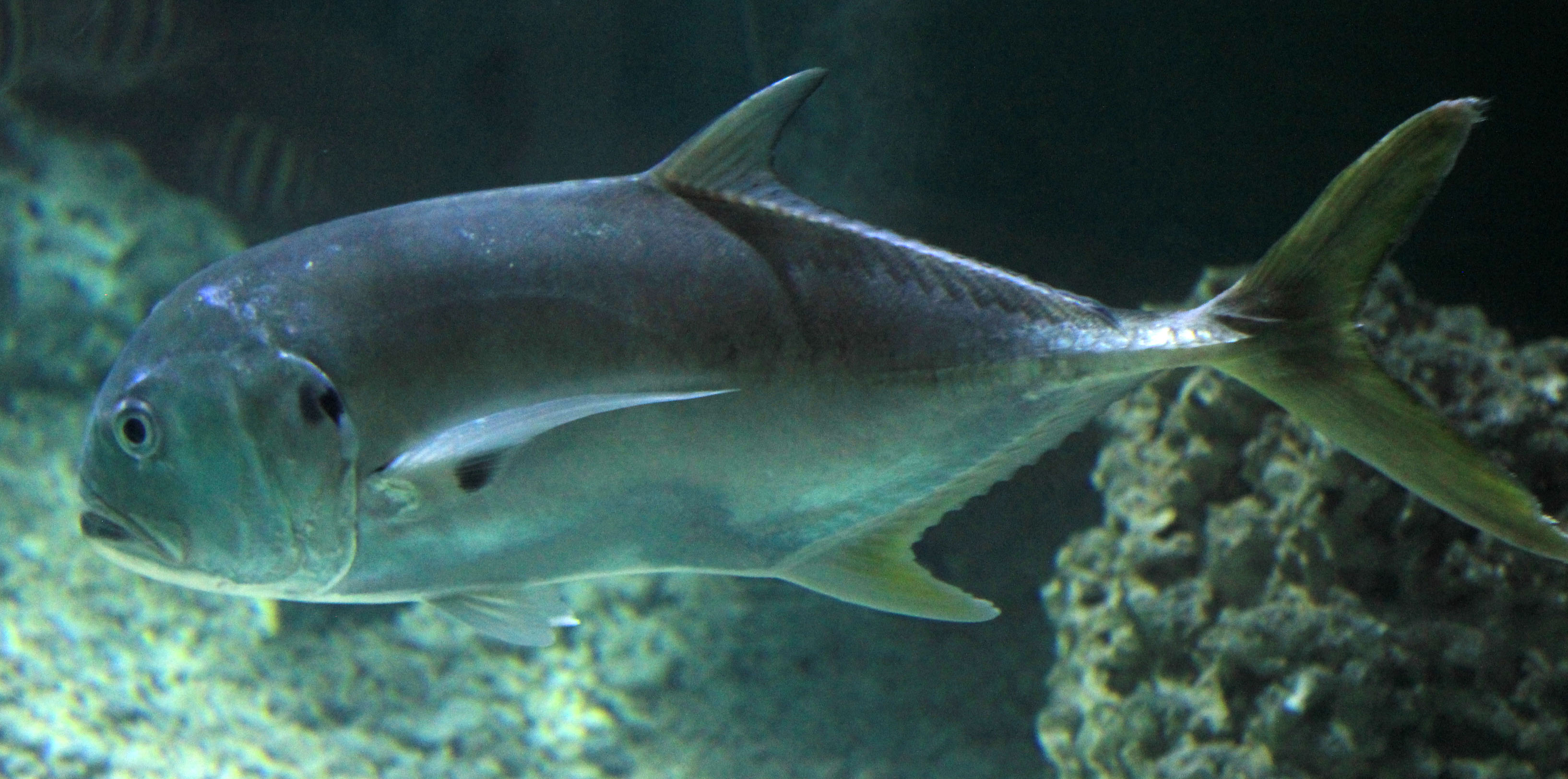
- Crevalle jack, Caranx hippos

Scientific classification
- Kingdom: Animalia
- Phylum: Chordata
- Class: Actinopterygii
- Division: Teleostei
- Order: Carangiformes
- Suborder: Carangoidei
- Family: Carangidae; Rafinesque, 1815

Subfamilies
- See text

= Carangidae =

Carangidae Temporal range: Danian–recent

Family of ray-finned fishes

The Carangidae are a family of ray-finned fish that includes the jacks, jack mackerels, runners, trevallies, and scads. It is one of the five families in the suborder Carangoidei.

They are found in the Atlantic, Indian and Pacific Oceans. Most species are fast-swimming predatory fishes that hunt in the waters above reefs and in the open sea; some dig in the sea floor for invertebrates.

The largest fish in the family, the greater amberjack, Seriola dumerili, grows up to 2 m (6 ft 7 in) in length; most fish in the family reach a maximum length of 25–100 cm (9.8–39 in).

The family contains many important commercial and game fish, notably the Pacific jack mackerel, Trachurus symmetricus, and the other jack mackerels in the genus Trachurus.

Many genera have fairly extensive fossil records, particularly Caranx and Seriola, which extend into the early Paleogene (late Thanetian), and are known from whole and incomplete specimens, skeletal fragments, and otoliths. The several extinct genera include Archaeus, Pseudovomer, and Eastmanalepes.

== Subfamilies and genera ==
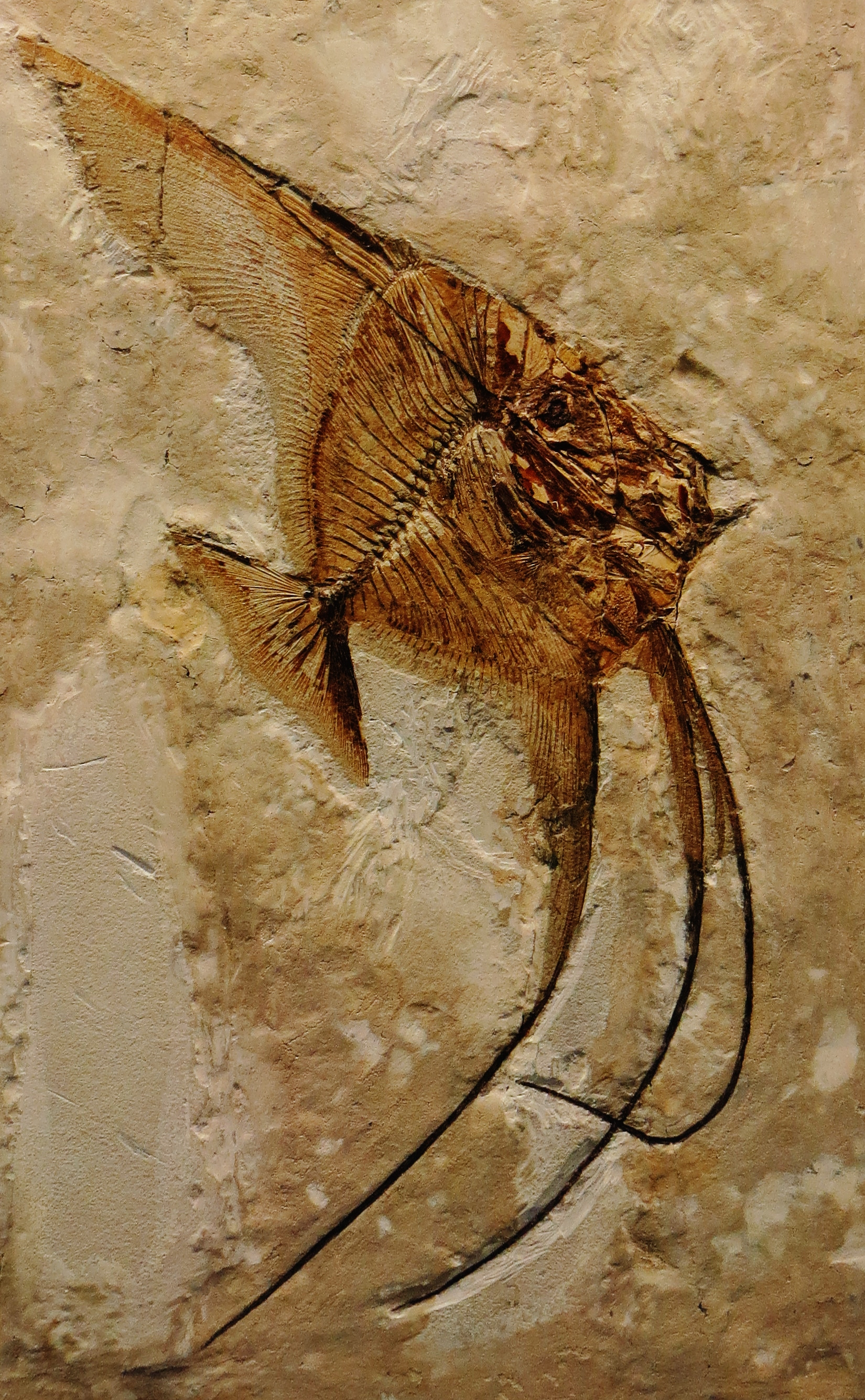
Ceratoichthys, an extinct carangid in the subfamily Vomeropsinae

The family Carangidae is subdivided into the following subfamilies and genera:

- Genus †Archaeus Agassiz, 1844 (formerly placed in invalid subfamily Archaeinae)
- Genus †Belgocaranx Taverne, Simaeys & Steurbaut, 2006
- Genus †Carangidarum [otolith]
- Genus †Matsyana Singh & Choudhary, 1972
- Genus †Paratrachinotus Blot, 1969
- Genus †Trachicaranx Daniltshenko, 1968 (=Uylyaichthys Prokofiev, 2002)
- Subfamily Naucratinae Bleeker, 1859
  - Genus Campogramma Regan, 1903
  - Genus Elagatis F.D. Bennett, 1840
  - Genus Naucrates Rafinesque, 1810
  - Genus Seriola Bleeker, 1854
  - Genus Seriolina Wakiya, 1924
- Subfamily Caranginae Rafinesque, 1815
  - Genus Alectis Rafinesque, 1815
  - Genus Alepes Swainson, 1839
  - Genus Atropus Oken, 1817
  - Genus Atule D.S. Jordan & E.K. Jordan, 1922
  - Genus Carangichthys Bleeker, 1853
  - Genus Carangoides Bleeker, 1851
  - Genus Caranx Lacepède, 1801
  - Genus Chloroscombrus Girard, 1858
  - Genus Craterognathus Kimura, Takeuchi & Yadome, 2022
  - Genus Decapterus Bleeker, 1851
  - Genus Euprepocaranx Kimura, Takeuchi & Yadome, 2022
  - Genus Ferdauia D.S. Jordan, Evermann & Wakiya in Jordan, Evermann & Tanaka, 1927
  - Genus Flavocaranx Kimura, Takeuchi & Yadome, 2022
  - Genus Gnathodon Bleeker, 1850
  - Genus Hemicaranx Bleeker, 1862
  - Genus Kaiwarinus Suzuki, 1962
  - Genus Megalaspis Bleeker, 1851
  - Genus Pantolabus Whitley, 1931
  - Genus Paraselene Kimura, Takeuchi & Yadome, 2022
  - Genus Parastromateus Bleeker, 1864
  - Genus Platycaranx Kimura, Takeuchi & Yadome, 2022
  - Genus Pseudocaranx Bleeker, 1863
  - Genus Scyris Cuvier, 1829
  - Genus Selar Bleeker, 1851
  - Genus Selaroides Bleeker, 1851
  - Genus Selene Lacepède, 1802
  - Genus Trachurus Rafinesque, 1810
  - Genus Turrum Whitley, 1932
  - Genus Uraspis Bleeker, 1855
  - Genus †Eastmanalepes Bannikov, 1984
  - Genus †Eothynnus Woodward, 1901
  - Genus †Pseudovomer Sauvage, 1870
  - Genus †Teratichthys Koenig, 1825
- †Vomeropsinae Bannikov, 1984
  - †Ceratoichthys Blot, 1969
  - †Vomeropsis Heckel, 1854

== See also ==
There are a great many fish called trevallies, most of which belong to the Carangidae. For articles on them, see.
