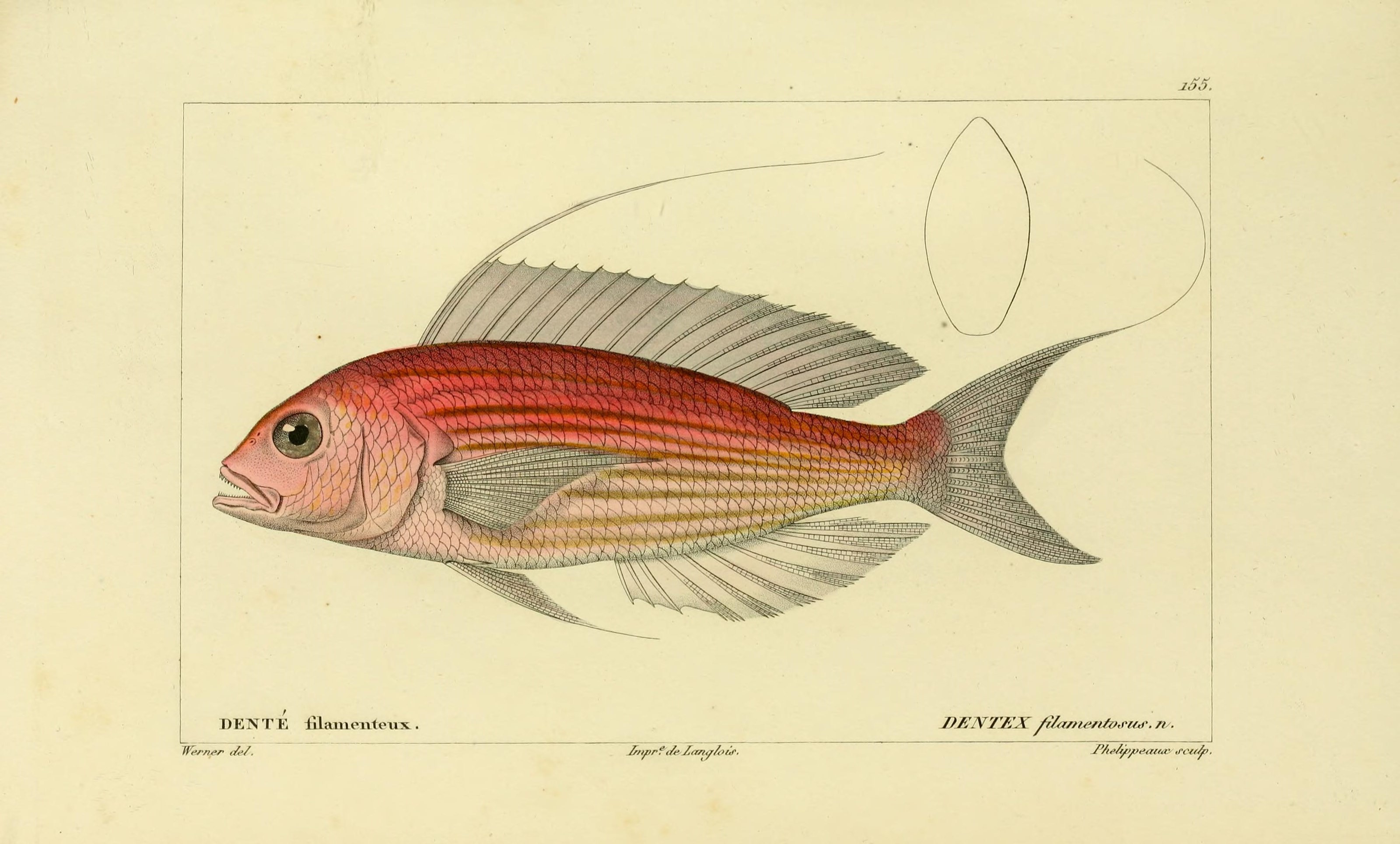

Conservation status
- Least Concern (IUCN 3.1)

Scientific classification
- Kingdom: Animalia
- Phylum: Chordata
- Class: Actinopterygii
- Order: Acanthuriformes
- Family: Nemipteridae
- Genus: Nemipterus
- Species: N. nematophorus

Binomial name
- Nemipterus nematophorus (Bleeker, 1854)

Synonyms
- Dentex nematophorus Bleeker, 1854; Synagris nematophorus (Bleeker, 1854); Dentex filamentosus Valenciennes, 1830; Synagris macronemus Günther, 1859

= Doublewhip threadfin bream =

Species of fish

The doublewhip threadfin bream (Nemipterus nematophorus) is a species of marine ray-finned fish belonging to the family Nemipteridae, the threadfin breams. This species is found in the Indo-West Pacific region.

== Taxonomy ==
The doublewhip threadfin bream was first formally described as Dentex nematophorus in 1854 by the Dutch physician, herpetologist and ichthyologist Pieter Bleeker with its type locality given as Padang on Sumatra. In 1830 Achille Valenciennes described Dentex filamentosus from "Suriname" and in 1839 William Swainson proposed Nemipterus as a subgenus of Dentex with D. filamentosus as its only species. Valenciennes name was subjectively invalid as Eduard Rüppell had described Cantharus filamentosus in 1828, which is now regarded as a synonym of N. japonicus, so in 1859 Albert Günther coined the replacement name Synagris macronemus but this was later shown to be a synonym of Bleeker's 1854 Dentex filamentosus. As D. filamentosus this species is the type species of the genus Nemipterus. The 5th edition of Fishes of the World classifies the genus Nemipterus within the family Nemipteridae which it places in the order Spariformes.

== Etymology ==
The doublewhip threadfin bream has the specific name nematophorus which means "thread bearer", nematos meaning "thread" and phorus meaning "to bear". This is a reference to the first pair of ray in the dorsal fin which are positioned very close to each other and fuse to create a long filament and the long filament growing from the upper lobe of the caudal fin.

== Description ==
The doublewhip threadfin bream has a depth of body which fits into its standard length between 2.9 and 3.5 times. The length of the snout is greater than or equal to the diameter of the eye. There are 3 to 5 pairs of canine-like teeth in the front of the upper jaw. The dorsal fin is supported by 10 spines, the first two being set very close together, nearly fused, and creating a long trailing filament, and 9 soft rays. The anal fin contains 3 spines and 7 soft rays. The pectoral and pelvic fins are long and extend to be level with the anus, the caudal fin is forked and its upper lobe is elongated into an extended filament. The colour of the upper head and body is pinkish with the lower body being silvery-white. There is a wide golden horizontal stripe below the lateral line and a clear gold patch at the front underneath the start of the lateral line. There are 3 thin horizontal golden stripes along the lower part of the body and a yellow stripe on either side of the belly. The dorsal fin is translucent, pinkish in colour with the filament and margin being yellow and there is an indistinct orange or yellow stripe running the length of the fin and the base of the fin is bluish. The caudal fin is pink, with the tip of the upper lobe and the filament being yellow, the pelvic and pectoral fins are pink with a yellow scale at their axillaries. The maximum published standard length for this fish is 20 cm (7.9 in) but 15 cm (5.9 in) is more typical.

== Distribution and habitat ==
The doublewhip threadfin bream is found in the eastern Indian Ocean and western Pacific Ocean. Its range extends from the eastern coast of India as far south as Chennai and the Andaman Sea east to Taiwan and the Philippines. Records from northwestern Australia have not been confirmed. It is a benthic fish found over sand and mud bottoms down to 75 m (246 ft).

== Fisheries ==
The doublewhip threadfin bream is commonly caught in bottom trawl and gill net fisheries but is not a target for large-scale commercial fisheries.
