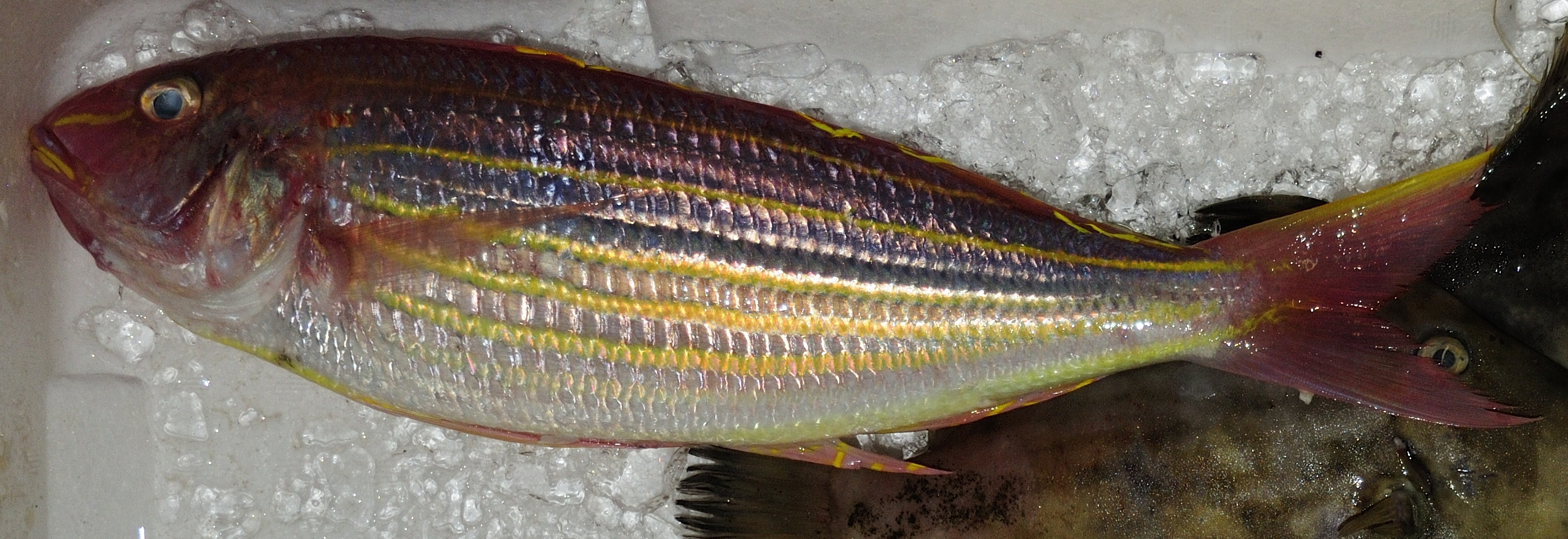

Conservation status
- Least Concern (IUCN 3.1)

Scientific classification
- Kingdom: Animalia
- Phylum: Chordata
- Class: Actinopterygii
- Order: Acanthuriformes
- Family: Nemipteridae
- Genus: Nemipterus
- Species: N. tambuloides

Binomial name
- Nemipterus tambuloides (Bleeker, 1853)

Synonyms
- Dentex tambuloides Bleeker, 1853; Nemipterus pentalinea Wongratana, 1974

= Nemipterus tambuloides =

Species of fish

Nemipterus tambuloides, the fivelined threadfin bream, is a species of marine ray-finned fish belonging to the family Nemipteridae, the threadfin breams. This fish is found in the Indo-Pacific region.

== Taxonomy ==
Nemipterus tambuloides was first formally described as Dentex tambuloides in 1853 by the Dutch physician and zoologist Pieter Bleeker with its type locality given as Jakarta. The 5th edition of Fishes of the World classifies Nemipterus within the family Nemipteridae which it places in the order Spariformes.

== Etymology ==
Nemipterus tambuloides has a specific name which suffixes oides with the specific name of Dentex tabula, a synonym of N. japonicus, to denote its resemblance to that species.

== Description ==
Nemipterus tambuloides has its dorsal fin supported by 10 spines and 9 soft rays while the anal fin contains3 spines and 7 soft rays. Its body has a standard length that is 3.2 to 3.6 times its depth and it has a snout that is longer than or equal to the diameter of the eye. There are 3 or 4 pairs of canine-like teeth in the front of the upper jaw. The pectoral and the pelvic fins are long, extending to between level of anus and origin of the anal fin. The caudal fin is forked with the upper lobe being pointed. The colour of the upper body is pinkish fading to on the lower body with 5 clear yellow longitudinal stripes along the body. The cheeks and operculum have gold and purple tints. The dorsal fin is translucent pink with a yellow margin and bluish grey stripe just below the margin and a slender yellow stripe running from immediately above its base, The anal fin is translucent and bluish white in colour with a pale yellow stripe close to its base, bending towards the rear and running along the last anal soft ray to its tip. The caudal fin is bright pinl, with the tip of the upper lobe being yellow. The pectoral fins are pale pink and the pelvic fins are pale yellowish. The maximum published standard length of this fish is 23 cm (9.1 in), although 18 cm (7.1 in) is more typical.

== Distribution and habitat ==
Nemipterus tambuloides' is found in the eastern Indian Ocean and Western Pacific Ocean. Its range extends from the Andaman Sea and Gulf of Thailand east to the western Philippines and includes the South China Sea, Sumatra, Java, Borneo and Bali. It is a demersal, non migratory species occurring at depths between 50 and 70 m (160 and 230 ft) over sandy or muddy substrates.

== Fisheries ==
Nemipterus tambuloides is commercially trawled for, albeit in a mixed catch, in Malaysia and Indonesia and is an important species in the making of surimi. It is also fished for using handline by subsitence and artisanal fishers.
