= Parascolopsis rufomaculata =

Conservation status
- Least Concern (IUCN 3.1)

Scientific classification
- Kingdom: Animalia
- Phylum: Chordata
- Class: Actinopterygii
- Order: Acanthuriformes
- Family: Nemipteridae
- Genus: Parascolopsis
- Species: P. rufomaculata

Binomial name
- Parascolopsis rufomaculata B. C. Russell, 1986

Species of fish

Parascolopsis rufomaculata, the red-spot dwarf monocle bream or yellowband monocle bream, is a species of marine ray-finned fish belonging to the family Nemipteridae, the threadfin breams. This species is found in the eastern Indian Ocean.

== Taxonomy ==
Parascolopsis rufomaculata was first formally described in 1986 by the Australian ichthyologist Barry C. Russell with its type locality given as the North West Shelf off Western Australia. The 5th edition of Fishes of the World classifies the genus Parascolopsis within the family Nemipteridae which it places in the order Spariformes.

== Etymology ==
Parascolopsis rufomaculata has the specific name rufomaculata which means "red spotted", an allusion to the red spot on the dorsal fin of fresh specimens. Russell originally used the masculine suffix -us but Parascolopsis is feminine.

== Description ==
Parascolopsis rufomaculata has its dorsal fin supported by 10 spines and 9 soft rays while the anal fin has 3 spines and 7 soft rays. The scales on the head extend forward on to the intraorbital area. The rear margin of the preoperculum is sloped forward and has a scaleless lower limb. The rear edge of the suborbital has very small teeth. The pectoral fins are moderately long, extending as far as or just falling short of the level of the anus while the pelvic fins are short, not reaching as far as the level of the anus. The dominant colour of the body is rosypink above the midlateral line and pearly white below it. There is a longitudinallight gold band running underneath the lateral line from the upper angle of the operculum to the caudal peduncle, below this is a pale pink band and then another indistinct gold band. The dorsal fin is pale yellow with a red spot between its eighth and tenth spines. The pectoral fin has a yellowish base and all of the other fins are hyaline. This species has a maximum published standard length of 15.5 cm (6.1 in), although 10 cm (3.9 in) is more typical This fish is very similar to its close relative P. tanyactis, except for the fact that the fourth and fifth dorsal rays are not elongated, and it has a broad golden stripe along the middle of its back.

== Distribution and habitat ==
Parascolopsis rufomaculata is endemic to the eastern Indian Ocean and was thought to occur only off Northwestern Australia between Dirk Hartog Island and the Timor Sea but in 2018 specimens were collected from off southern Java. It is a bathydemersal fish found at depths between 210 and 300 m (690 and 980 ft) in offshore waters, although the Javan specimens were collected at shallower depths.
