= Nemipterus isacanthus =

Conservation status
- Least Concern (IUCN 3.1)

Scientific classification
- Kingdom: Animalia
- Phylum: Chordata
- Class: Actinopterygii
- Division: Teleostei
- Order: Acanthuriformes
- Family: Nemipteridae
- Genus: Nemipterus
- Species: N. isacanthus

Binomial name
- Nemipterus isacanthus (Bleeker, 1873)

Synonyms
- Dentex isacanthus Bleeker, 1873

Species of fish

Nemipterus isacanthus, the teardrop threadfin bream or twinlined threadfin bream, is a species of marine ray-finned fish belonging to the family Nemipteridae, the threadfin and whiptail breams. This fish is found in the western Pacific Ocean.

== Taxonomy ==
Nemipterus isacanthus was first formally described as Dentex isacanthus by the Dutch physician and zoologist Pieter Bleeker with its type locality given as Jakarta in Indonesia. The 5th edition of Fishes of the World classifies Nemipterus within the family Nemipteridae which it places in the order Spariformes.

== Etymology ==
Nemipterus isacanthus has the specific name isacanthus which is a compound of iso, meaning "same", and acanthus, meaning "spine" or "thorn", an allusion to the equal lengths of the 7 rear spines in the dorsal fin in comparison with its then presumed congeners in the genus Dentex.

== Description ==
Nemipterus isacanthus has its dorsal fin supported by 10 spines and 9 soft rays while the anal fin contains 3 spines and 7 soft rays. Its body has a standard length that is 3 to 3.5 times its depth and it has a snout that is equal to in length or longer than the diameter of the eye. There are 3 pairs of canine-like teeth in the front of the upper jaw. The pectoral fins are long and extend beyond the anus and the pelvic fins are of moderate length extending nearly as far or to the anus. The caudal fin has a deep fork. The colour of the body is pinkish purple, silvery on the lower flank, breast and belly. The crown and the back have a yellow tint to the pink colour. There are 2 wide, horizontal light golden stripes along the body, the first starts below the anterior end of the lateral line and extends to the upper caudal peduncle, the second begins to the rear of the base of the pectoral fin and reached the lower part of the caudal peduncle. to upper caudal-fin base, the second from behind pectoral-fin base to lower caudal-fin base. There is another pale yellow stripe on either side of a line running through the anus. The snout is pinkish and there is a yellow teardrop-shaped bar below the eye, this angles forwards to midway down the suborbital area. The upper lip is yellow, there is a bluish patch on the upper portion of the operculum. The dorsal fin is hyaline with a thin yellow margin bordered with yellow and a slender yellow longitudinal stripe below its midline. The caudal fin is pink with the upper tip being vivid yellow and the lower lobe has a yellow tint. The anal fin and pelvic fins hyaline whitish and the pectoral fins pinkish and hyaline. The pelvic fins are white and the pectoral fins are pink. The maximum published standard length of this fish is 21 cm (8.3 in), although 17 cm (6.7 in) is more typical.

== Distribution and habitat ==
Nemipterus isacanthus is found in the eastern Indian Ocean and western Pacific Ocean where it occurs from the Malacca Straits and northwestern Australia east through the Gulf of Thailand and Indonesiato the Philippines and Papua New Guinea. This species is sometimes confused with N. bleekeri, a synonym of N. bipunctatus, and so records from the western part of its range require confirmation. This is a demersal fish found over sandy and muddy substartes at depths between 50 and 200 m (160 and 660 ft).

== Fisheries ==
Nemipterus isacanthus is too small a species to support a commercial fishery but is taken in artisanla and commerciela fisheries, and probably as bycatch in shrimp trawl fisheries.
