= Parascolopsis baranesi =

Conservation status
- Data Deficient (IUCN 3.1)

Scientific classification
- Kingdom: Animalia
- Phylum: Chordata
- Class: Actinopterygii
- Order: Acanthuriformes
- Family: Nemipteridae
- Genus: Parascolopsis
- Species: P. baranesi

Binomial name
- Parascolopsis baranesi B. C. Russell & Golani, 1993

Species of fish

Parascolopsis baranesi, also known as Baranes's dwarf monocle bream, is a species of marine ray-finned fish belonging to the family Nemipteridae, the threadfin breams. This fish is endemic to the Gulf of Aqaba in the western Indian Ocean.

== Taxonomy ==
Parascolopsis baranesi was first formally described in 1993 by Barry C. Russell and Daniel Golani with its type locality given as Eilat in Israel. This species is very similar to P. boesemani and the two may prove to be conspecific. The 5th edition of Fishes of the World classifies the genus Parascolopsis within the family Nemipteridae which it places in the order Spariformes.

== Etymology ==
The specific name honours Albert (Avi) Baranes, the Director of the Interuniversity Institute for Marine Sciences in Eilat, Israel, who made it possible to collect this species in the Gulf of Aqaba.

== Description ==
Parascolopsis baranesi has a moderately deep body which has a depth that fits into its standard length 2.4 to 2.8 times. The dorsal fin is supported by 10 spines and 9 soft rays while the anal fin contains 3 spines and 7 soft rays. The colour of the body is pale pinkish shading to silvery on the lower body. There is a light yellow stripe starting underneath the lateral line to the rear of the upper corner of the operculum and extending to the upper part of the caudal peduncle. There are 3 indistinct, broken vertical bars on the upper body. The dorsal fin is light yellow close to its base and has a large red blotch on the spiny part of the fin. The caudal fin is pale yellow, reddish near its base and tinged pinkish towards its margin. This species has a maximum published standard length of 11.2 cm (4.4 in).

== Distribution and habitat ==
Parascolopsis baranesi is known only from the Gulf of Aqaba in the Western Indian Ocean. It is a bathydemersal species found at depths between 160 and 500 m (520 and 1,640 ft).
