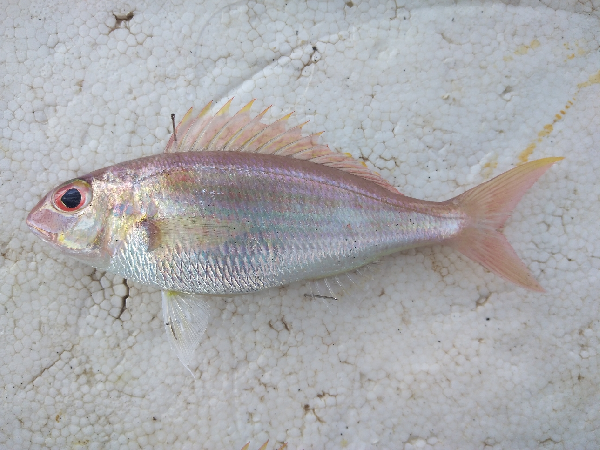

Conservation status
- Least Concern (IUCN 3.1)

Scientific classification
- Kingdom: Animalia
- Phylum: Chordata
- Class: Actinopterygii
- Order: Acanthuriformes
- Family: Nemipteridae
- Genus: Nemipterus
- Species: N. peronii

Binomial name
- Nemipterus peronii (Valenciennes, 1830)

Synonyms
- Dentex peronii Valenciennes, 1830; Synagris peronii (Valenciennes, 1830); Dentex tolu Valenciennes, 1830; Nemipterus tolu (Valenciennes, 1830); Cantharus guliminda Valenciennes, 1830; Dentex mulloides Bleeker, 1852; Dentex smithii Steindachner, 1868; Nemipterus smithii (Steindachner, 1868); Dentex obtusus van Hasselt & S. Müller, in Bleeker, 1873; Nemipterus oveniides Popta, 1921; Nemipterus samsonensis Scott, 1959

= Nemipterus peronii =

Species of fish

Nemipterus peronii, the notchedfin threadfin bream, notchedfin butterfly bream rosy threadfin bream or Peron's threadfin bream, is a species of marine ray-finned fish belonging to family Nemipteridae, the threadfin breams. This species occurs in the Indo-West Pacific region.

== Taxonomy ==
Nemipterus peronii was first formally described in 1830 as Dentex peronii by the French zoologist Achille Valenciennes, Valenciennes did not give a type locality but it is thought to be Northwestern Australia. The 5th edition of Fishes of the World classifies Nemipterus within the family Nemipteridae which it places in the order Spariformes.

== Etymology ==
Nemipterus peronii has a specific name which honours the collector of the type, the French voyager and naturalist François Péron.

== Description ==
Nemipterus peronii has its dorsal fin supported by 10 spines and 9 soft rays while the anal fin contains3 spines and 7 soft rays. The spines of the dorsal fin are elongate and there is a deep notch between the spiny part of the dorsal fin and the soft rayed part. Its body has a standard length that is 3.1 to 4.1 times its depth and it has a snout that is roughly equal in length to the diameter of the eye. There are 3 or 4 pairs of canine-like teeth in the front of the upper jaw. The short pectoral fins do not reach the anus while the moderately long pelvic fins extend to the level of the anus. The caudal fin has a deep fork with the upper lobe being pointed and a little longer than the lower lobe. The colour of the upper body is pinkish marked with 7 or 8 vaguely delineated pink saddle marks extending as far as or a little beyond the lateral line. The lower body is silvery with the scale rows being marked with indistinct golden lines. There is a vague reddish spot just below the front end of the lateral line. The snout has a golden line on it that passes through the nostrils. There is a silvery-purple area underneath the eye and the preoperculum and operculum have a golden sheen. The dorsal fin has an overall colour of pale whitish pink, with a light yellow line or row of spots just over its base and the tips of the spines are orange. The anal fin has a similar colour to the dorsal but has a yellow tint on its central part. The caudal fin is pinkish, the pelvic fins are white with a yellow scale at their bases and the pectoral fins are translucent. The maximum published standard length of this fish is 29 cm (11 in), although 17 cm (6.7 in) is more typical.

== Distribution and habitat ==
Nemipterus peronii is found in the Indian and Pacific Oceans. It occurs in the Red Sea, Persian Gulf, along the coasts of Pakistan, India and Sri Lanka east into the Western Pacific where it reaches north to southern Japan and south to Australia. There is some confusion between this species and N. furcosus and the presence of either species off New Caledonia was still in need of confirmation in 2011. The notchedfin threafin bream is found on sandy and muddy substrates at depths between 17 and 100 m (56 and 328 ft).

== Biology ==
Nemipterus peronii feeds on fishes, crustaceans, polychaetes and molluscs. It is typically encountered in rather nervous groups during the daylight hours. It has 2 extended spawning season in the South China Sea, one in November to February and the other beginning in May or June.

== Fisheries ==
Nemipterus peronii is caught using hand lines and Bottom trawling, the catch is often a mixed catch with other threadfin breams. There is a commercial fishery for this species in the Straits of Malacca and in the South China Sea off the coast of Terengganu in Malaysia. This species is found in small numbers in local fish markets and may be sold either fresh or dried-salted.
