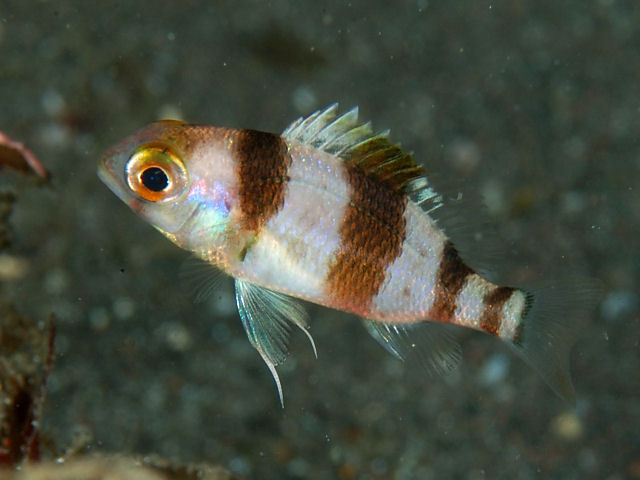

Conservation status
- Least Concern (IUCN 3.1)

Scientific classification
- Kingdom: Animalia
- Phylum: Chordata
- Class: Actinopterygii
- Order: Acanthuriformes
- Family: Nemipteridae
- Genus: Parascolopsis
- Species: P. inermis

Binomial name
- Parascolopsis inermis (Temminck & Schlegel, 1843)

Synonyms
- Scolopsides inermis Temminck & Schlegel, 1843; Scolopsis inermis (Temminck & Schlegel, 1843); Heterognathodon doederleini Ishikawa, 1904

= Parascolopsis inermis =

Species of fish

Parascolopsis inermis, the unarmed dwarf monocle bream, banded monocle bream, redbelt monocle bream or yellow monocle bream, is a species of marine ray-finned fish belonging to the family Nemipteridae, the threadfin breams. This fish is found in the Indian and Western Pacific Oceans.

== Taxonomy ==
Parascolopsis inermis was first formally described as Scolopsides inermis in 1843 by Coenraad Jacob Temminck and Hermann Schlegel with its type locality given as Japan. The 5th edition of Fishes of the World classifies the genus Parascolopsis within the family Nemipteridae which it places in the order Spariformes.

== Etymology ==
Parascolopsis inermis has the specific name inermis which means "unarmed", referring to the suborbital finely serrated or smooth rear margin with a tiny spine at its angle.

== Description ==
Parascolopsis inermis has 10 spines and 9 soft rays supporting the dorsal fin while the anal fin is supported by 3 spines and 7 soft rays. The scales on the crown extend forward to the intraorbital region. The rear margin of the preoperculum has a slight slope towards the front. The lower limb of preoperculum has no scales. The rear edge of the suborbital is finely serrated and has a tiny spine at its upper angle. The pectoral fins are long, extending as far as or past the level of the anus. The pelvic fins are also long, extending as far as or near to the level of anus. The depth of the body fits 2.6 to 2.9 times into its standard length and length of the snout is around equal to or slightly less than the diameter of the eye. The overall colour of the body is pale yellow, shading to silver ventrally. There are 4 wide dark reddish vertical bars along the back with light coloured bars in the spaces between the dark bars. The dorsal fin is yellowish with red spots. This species has a maximum published standard length of 18 cm (7.1 in), although 12 cm (4.7 in) is more typical.

== Distribution and habitat ==
Parascolopsis inermis is found in the Indian and Pacific Oceans from the Laccadive Islands and Sri Lanka east to southern Japan and the South China Sea and south to northwestern Australia and the Coral Sea. This species is found at depths between 60 and 131 m (197 and 430 ft) in offshore waters over sandy or muddy substrates, typically in small schools.
