= Parascolopsis melanophrys =

Conservation status
- Data Deficient (IUCN 3.1)

Scientific classification
- Kingdom: Animalia
- Phylum: Chordata
- Class: Actinopterygii
- Order: Acanthuriformes
- Family: Nemipteridae
- Genus: Parascolopsis
- Species: P. melanophrys

Binomial name
- Parascolopsis melanophrys B. C. Russell & P. K. Chin, 1996

Species of fish

Parascolopsis melanophrys, the dwarf monocle bream, is a species of marine ray-finned fish belonging to the family Nemipteridae, the threadfin breams. This species is found in the western-central Pacific Ocean.

== Taxonomy ==
Parascolopsis melanophrys was first formally described in 1996 by Barry C. Russell and Chin Phui-Kong with its type locality given as Kupang in West Timor in Indonesia. The 5th edition of Fishes of the World classifies the genus Parascolopsis within the family Nemipteridae which it places in the order Spariformes.

=== Etymology ===
The specific name melanophrys is a compound of melanos, meaning "black", and ophrys, which means "eyebrow", an allusion to the triangular black spot above and to the rear of the eye on both sides of the nape.

== Description ==
Parascolopsis melanophrys has 10 spines and 9 soft rays supporting the dorsal fin while the anal fin contains 3 spines and 7 soft rays. The body is moderately deep, having a depth that fits into its standard length 2.8 times, and the head is relatively large. The pectoral fins are long, extending to the level of the anus and the pelvic fins are moderately long, extending as far as or nearly as far as the anus. The overall colour of the body is rosy pink, with a purple sheen, shading to silvery white on the lower surface. There is a wide pale lemon longitudinal stripe along the flanks starting over the base of the pectoral fin base where the lateral line starts to the lower half of the caudal peduncle and another indistinct lemon stripe along the middle of the lower surface running from behind the throat to the caudal peduncle. There are vague hints of yellow on the operculum. The most distinctive marking is the triangular black spot above and behind eye on both sides of the nape. The upper lobe of the caudal fin is pale pink and the lower lobe is pale yellow. The dorsal and anal fins are almost transparent and pink while the pectoral and pelvic fins are nearly transparent and yellow. This species has a maximum published standard length of 17.7 cm (7.0 in).

== Distribution ==
Parascolopsis melanophrys was described from specimens collected from fish markets in Kupang in West Timor and Tawau in Sabah. It has since been recorded from Madang in Papua New Guinea and Davao Gulf in the Philippines. It is a bathydemersal fish typically found in deeper waters, up to 500 m (1,600 ft) on the outer shelf and continental slope.
