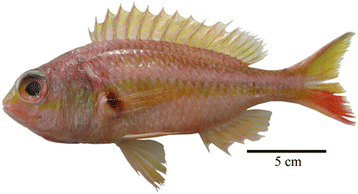

Conservation status
- Least Concern (IUCN 3.1)

Scientific classification
- Kingdom: Animalia
- Phylum: Chordata
- Class: Actinopterygii
- Order: Acanthuriformes
- Family: Nemipteridae
- Genus: Parascolopsis
- Species: P. capitinis

Binomial name
- Parascolopsis capitinis B. C. Russell, 1996

= Parascolopsis capitinis =

Species of fish

Parascolopsis capitinis, the large-head threadfin bream is a species of marine ray-finned fish belonging to the family Nemipteridae, the threadfin breams. This species is found in the western Indian Ocean.

== Taxonomy ==
Parascolopsis capitinis was first formally described in 1996 by the Australian ichthyologist Barry C. Russell with its type locality given as the fish market in Trincomalee, Sri Lanka. The 5th edition of Fishes of the World classifies the genus Parascolopsis within the family Nemipteridae which it places in the order Spariformes.

=== Etymology ===
The specific name capitinis suffixes inis to caput, meaning "head", an allusion to the large head of this species.

== Description ==
Parascolopsis capitinis has a moderately deep body which has a standard length which is 2.7 to 3 times longer than its depth. It has a continuous, incised dorsal fin supported by 10 spines and 9 soft rays. The anal fin is supported by 3 spines and 7 soft rays. The pectoral fins are long, reaching to or near to the level of the anus while the pelvic fins are also long, reaching the level of vent. The colour of the body is dark pinkish, darker on the upper body than on the lower, with a wide, horizontal yellow strip along the middle of the flanks. There is a dark, elongated blotch near the front end of the lateral line. The dorsal din is light red with a redder edge on the spiny part, the pectoral fins are pink with black on the upper base, the pelvic and anal fins are transparent yellow and the caudal fin is pink, sometimes with a yellow tint. This fish attains a standard length of 26 cm (10 in), although 20 cm (7.9 in) is more typical

== Distribution ==
Parascolopsis capitinis is a demersal fish which is known to occur in the Western Indian Ocean off Sri Lanka and southern India.
