= Parascolopsis qantasi =

Conservation status
- Data Deficient (IUCN 3.1)

Scientific classification
- Kingdom: Animalia
- Phylum: Chordata
- Class: Actinopterygii
- Order: Acanthuriformes
- Family: Nemipteridae
- Genus: Parascolopsis
- Species: P. qantasi

Binomial name
- Parascolopsis qantasi B. C. Russell & Gloerfelt-Tarp, 1984

Species of fish

Parascolopsis qantasi, the slender dwarf monocle bream, is a species of marine ray-finned fish belonging to the family Nemipteridae, the threadfin breams. This fish is found in the eastern Indian Ocean.

== Taxonomy ==
Parascolopsis qantasi was first formally described in 1984 by Barry C Russell and Thomas Gloerfelt-Tarp with its type locality given as the Mentawai Strait north east of Sipora. The 5th edition of Fishes of the World classifies the genus Parascolopsis within the family Nemipteridae which it places in the order Spariformes.

=== Etymology ===
Parascolopsis qantasi honours the Australian airline Qantas with its specific name, in recognition of the invaluable help over three years from the staff of the Denpasar office of Qantas to Gloerfelt-Tarp.

== Description ==
Parascolopsis qantasi has its dorsal fin supported by 10 spines and 9 soft rays while the anal fin has 3 spines and 7 soft rays. The scales on the head extend forward in a V-shape to the intraorbital area. The rear margin of the preoperculum is nearly vertical and has a scaleless lower limb. The rear edge of the suborbital has 2 or 3 tiny spines and a small spine at its upper angle. The pectoral fins are moderately long, extending as far as or nearly as far as the level of the vent. The long pelvic fins extend past the vent. The back is dark brownish, shading to whitish on the lower body. There is a clear black spot at the pectoral fin base. This species has a maximum published standard length of 10.3 cm (4.1 in).

== Distribution and habitat ==
Parascolopsis qantasi has been found only in the Mentawai Strait off western Sumatra, where the two known specimens were collected. It is a demersal species found over muddy bottoms.
