= Parascolopsis townsendi =

Conservation status
- Least Concern (IUCN 3.1)

Scientific classification
- Kingdom: Animalia
- Phylum: Chordata
- Class: Actinopterygii
- Order: Acanthuriformes
- Family: Nemipteridae
- Genus: Parascolopsis
- Species: P. townsendi

Binomial name
- Parascolopsis townsendi Boulenger, 1901

Synonyms
- Scolopsis townsendi (Boulenger, 1901)

Species of fish

Parascolopsis townsendi, the scaly dwarf monocle bream, is a species of marine ray-finned fish in the family Nemipteridae, the threadfin breams. It is found in the western Indian Ocean.

== Taxonomy ==
Parascolopsis townsendi was first formally described in 1901 as the only species in the monospecific genus Parascolopsis by the Belgian-born British ichthyologist George Albert Boulenger. It is, therefore, the type species of the genus Parascolopsis by monotypy. The 5th edition of Fishes of the World classifies the genus Parascolopsis within the family Nemipteridae which it places in the order Spariformes.

=== Etymology ===
Parascolopsis townsendi is named in honour of Captain Frederick William Townsend (d. 1948), the Commander of the Indian Cable-Ship Patrick Stewart, who collected many specimens of fishes and molluscs while laying cables in the Persian Gulf, including the type specimen of this species.

== Description ==
Parascolopsis townsendi has its dorsal fin supported by 10 spines and 9 soft rays while the anal fin has 3 spines and 7 soft rays. The depth of this fish's body fits into its standard length between 2.4 and 2.7 times. The snout is typically shorter than the diameter of the eye. The scales on the head extend as far as the rear nostril. The posterior edge of the preoperculum has a slightly backwards slope and a scaled lower limb. The suborbital is scaly with a finely serrated rear edge and no spine at its upper angle. The pectoral fin is long reaching the origin of the anal fin while the pelvic fin is also long reaching as far as or just falling short of the level of the anus. The body has an overall colour of this species is reddish with a silvery stripe along the flanks. This species has a maximum published standard length of 20 cm (7.9 in), although 10 cm (3.9 in) is more typical

== Distribution and habitat ==
Parascolopsis townsendi is found in the Western Indian Ocean in the Red Sea, Gulf of Aden, Gulf of Oman and the Arabian Sea, as far east as Palistan. It is a demersal fish found in offshore waters at depths between 100 and 410 m (330 and 1,350 ft) om sandy and muddy substrates.
