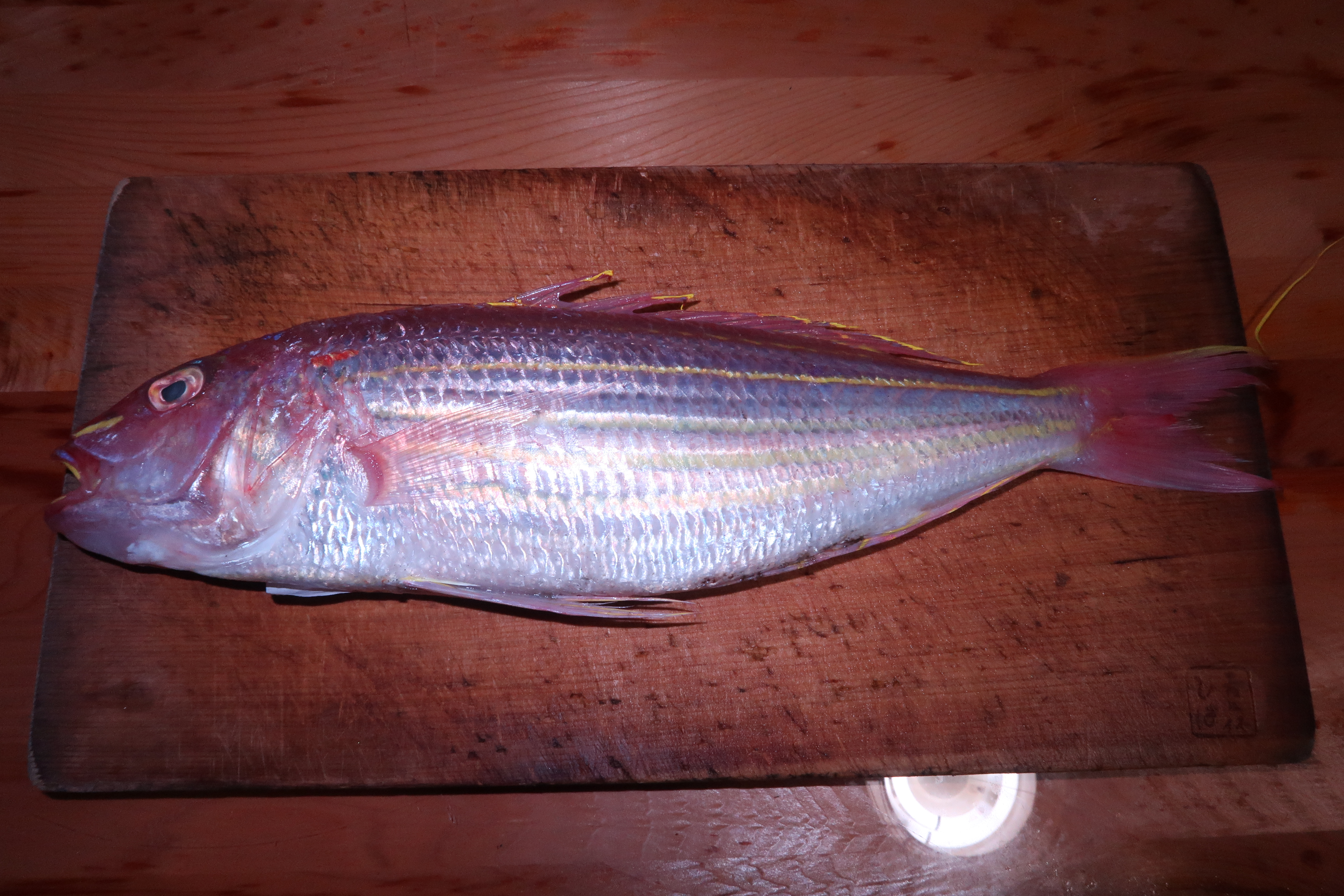

Conservation status
- Vulnerable (IUCN 3.1)

Scientific classification
- Kingdom: Animalia
- Phylum: Chordata
- Class: Actinopterygii
- Division: Teleostei
- Order: Acanthuriformes
- Family: Nemipteridae
- Genus: Nemipterus
- Species: N. virgatus

Binomial name
- Nemipterus virgatus (Houttuyn, 1782)

Synonyms
- Sparus virgatus Houttuyn, 1782; Synagris virgatus (Houttuyn, 1782); Sparus sinensis Lacépède, 1802; Dentex setigerus Valenciennes, 1830; Nemipterus matsubarae Jordan & Evermann, 1902; Cheimarius matsubarae (Jordan & Evermann, 1902); Dentex matsubarae (Jordan & Evermann, 1902); Synagris matsubarae (Jordan & Evermann, 1902)

= Nemipterus virgatus =

Species of fish

Nemipterus virgatus, the golden threadfin bream or yellowlipped threadfin bream, is a species of marine ray-finned fish in the family Nemipteridae, the threadfin breams. This species is found in the Western Pacific Ocean.

== Etymology ==
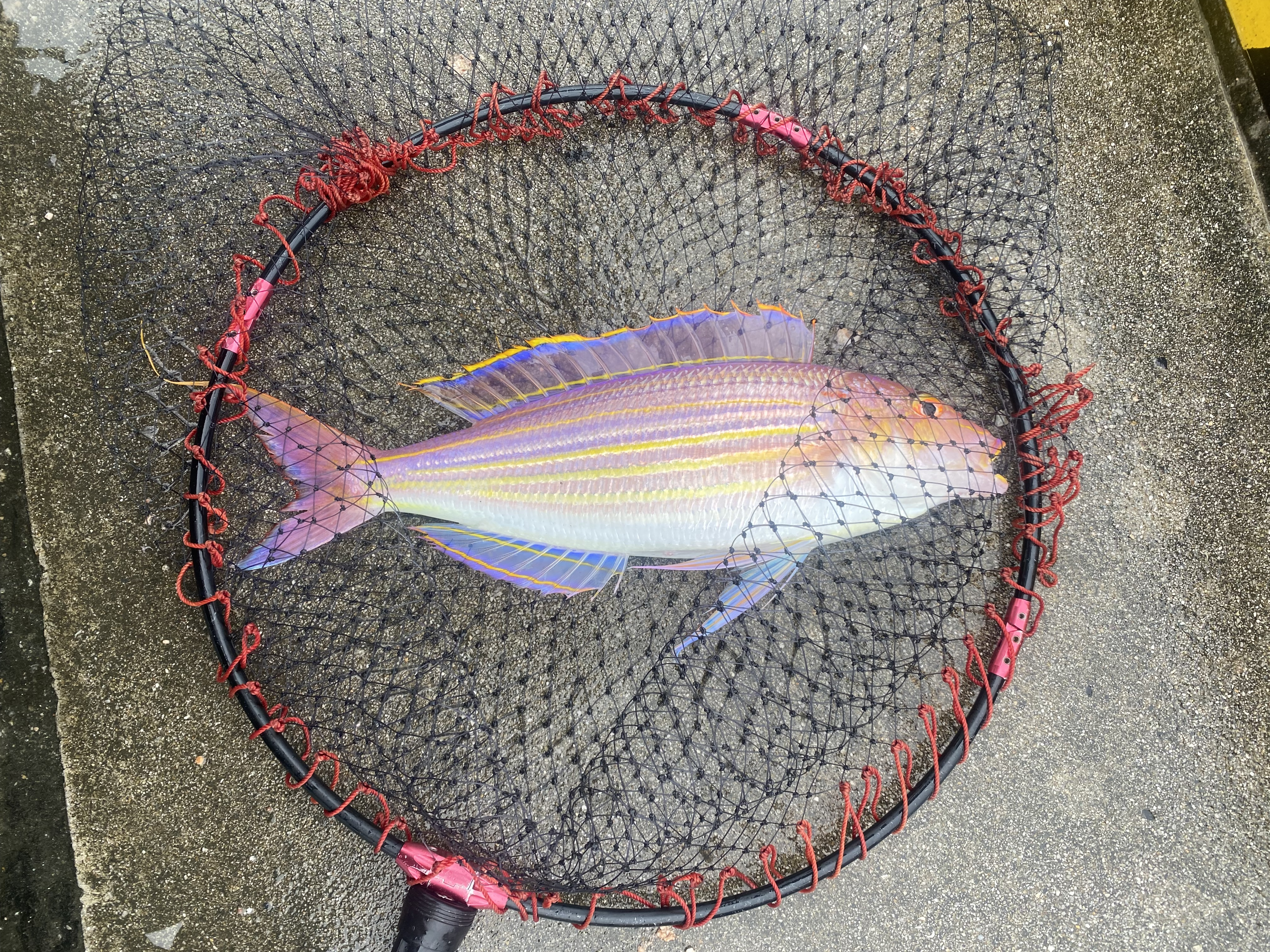
Caught in Japan

The specific name, virgatus, which means "striped", is an allusion to the yellow longitudinal stripes on the back and the flanks of this fish.

== Taxonomy ==
Nemipterus virgatus was first formally described as Sparus virgatus in 1782 by the Dutch naturalist Martinus Houttuyn with its type locality given as Japan.

== Description ==
=== Body form and size ===
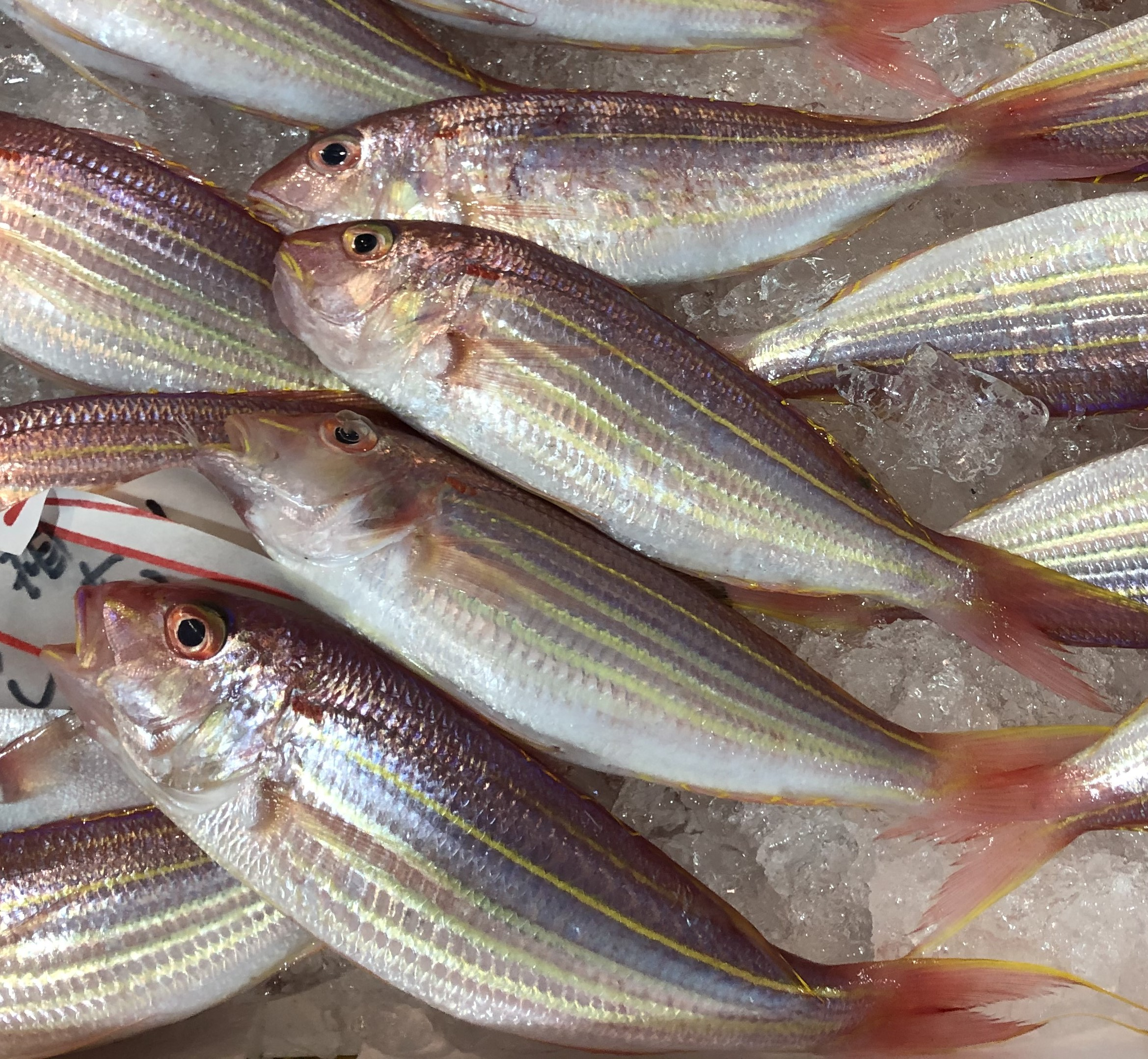
Sold in Japan

The dorsal fin of Nemipterus virgatus is supported by 10 spines and 9 soft rays, while the anal fin contains 3 spines and 8 soft rays. The standard length is 3.2 to 4 times the depth of the fish, and the snout is longer than the diameter of the eye. There are 3 or 4 pairs of canine-like teeth in the front of the upper jaw. The pectoral and the pelvic fins are long, extending to between the level of anus and the origin of the anal fin. The caudal fin is moderately forked, with the upper lobe being extended into a filament. The maximum published standard length of this species is 35 cm (14 in), although a standard length of 23 cm (9.1 in) is more typical.

=== Coloration ===
The color of the upper body is pink, becoming paler on the lower body. There is a yellow stripe on the back above the lateral line and 5 more yellow stripes on the flanks below the lateral line. The breast and belly are white. The head is pink with a yellow stripe running from the upper lip onto the lower front margin of the eye, and there are sometimes two indistinct yellow bars over the cheeks. The eye is rosy in color and the upper lip is yellow. The dorsal fin is light pink with a wide yellow margin (which has a red edge at the front of the fin), and there is a yellow stripe immediately above its base. The pelvic fins are pinkish, with a yellow stripe along the second and third fin rays. The pectoral fins are semi-transparent or pinkish, and so is the anal fin; the latter additionally has a yellow stripe below its margin and a thin yellow stripe immediately over its base, extending to the tip of last soft ray. The caudal fin is pink with a yellow upper margin; the filament is also yellow.

== Distribution and habitat ==
Nemipterus virgatus is found in the Western Pacific Ocean, where it is found in southern Japan, the East China Sea, and the northern part of the South China Sea (where it ranges from Vietnam to the Taiwan Strait and the Philippines). There is a separate population in northwestern Australia and the Arafura Sea. It is a demersal fish and can found at depths between 1–220 m (3.3–721.8 ft), but the more typical depth range is 18–33 m (59–108 ft). Juveniles tend to be found in shallower water than the adults, over sandy and muddy substrates.

== Biology ==
Nemipterus virgatus is a rudimentary hermaphrodite: the males have functional male gonads but also have some ovarian tissues for their whole life. In the South China Sea, spawning occurs between February and June, peaking between February and April. They feed on smaller fishes, crustaceans and cephalopods.

== Fisheries and conservation ==
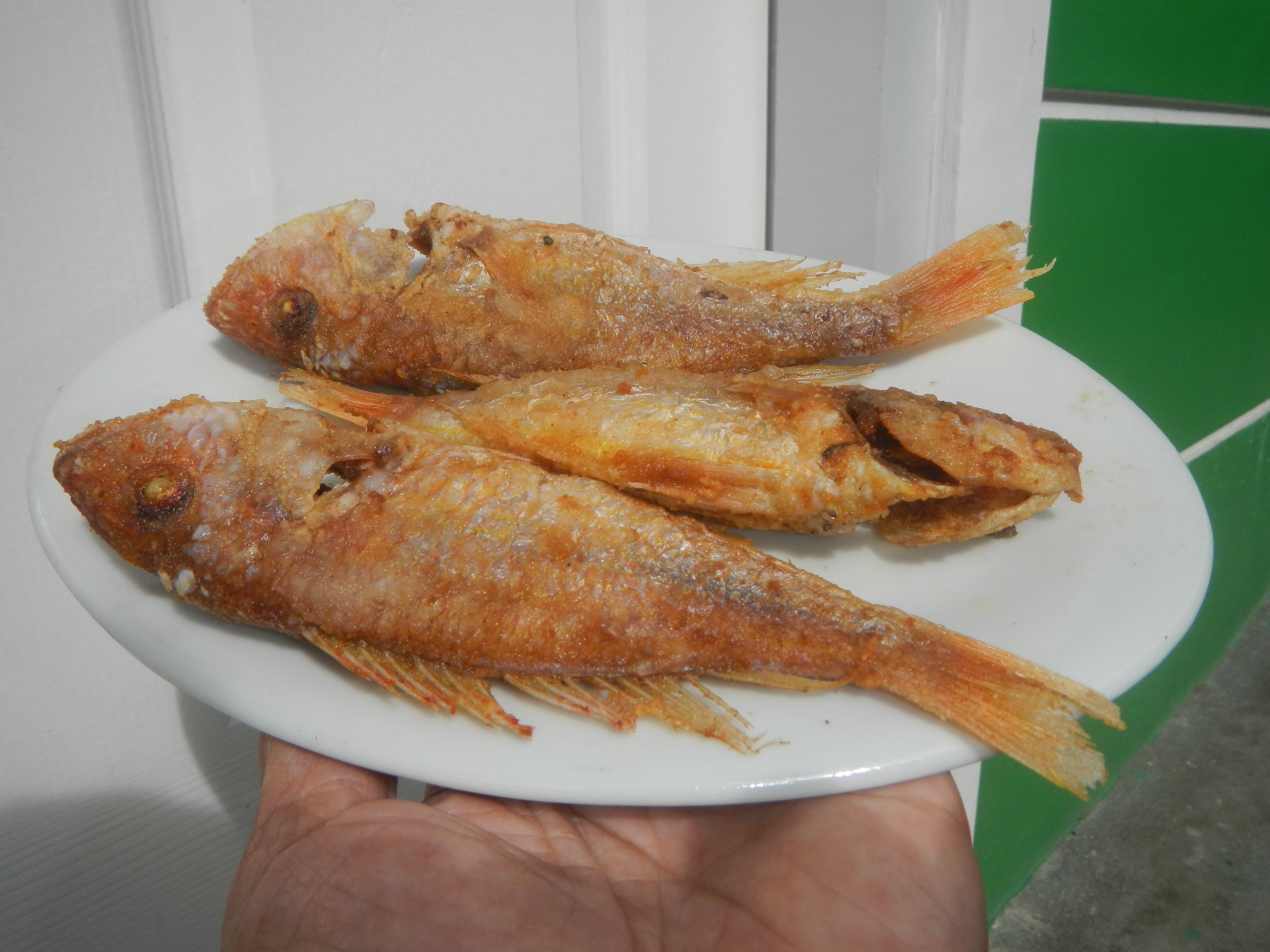
Fried

Nemipterus virgatus is an important target species for commercial fisheries in the East and South China Sea, where it is caught using handlines, longlines and bottom trawls. The juveniles are also caught in large numbers as bycatch in shrimp trawl fisheries. The annual catch of this species declined by 30% in the ten years up to 2010 and the IUCN assesses it as Vulnerable.

== See also ==
- Chikuwa
