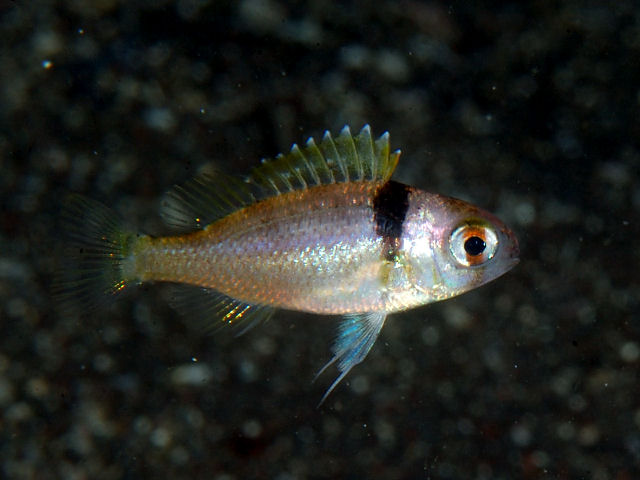

Conservation status
- Least Concern (IUCN 3.1)

Scientific classification
- Kingdom: Animalia
- Phylum: Chordata
- Class: Actinopterygii
- Order: Acanthuriformes
- Family: Nemipteridae
- Genus: Parascolopsis
- Species: P. eriomma

Binomial name
- Parascolopsis eriomma (D. S. Jordan & R. E. Richardson, 1909)

Synonyms
- Scolopsis eriomma Jordan & Richardson, 1909

= Parascolopsis eriomma =

Species of fish

Parascolopsis eriomma, the rosy dwarf monocle bream, is a species of marine ray-finned fish belonging to the family Nemipteridae, the threadfin breams. This species is found in the Indian and Western Pacific Oceans.

== Taxonomy ==
Parascolopsis eriomma was first formally described in 1909 as Scolopsis eriomma by the American ichthyologists David Starr Jordan and Robert Earl Richardson with its type locality given as Kaohsiung in Taiwan. The 5th edition of Fishes of the World classifies the genus Parascolopsis within the family Nemipteridae which it places in the order Spariformes.

== Etymology ==
Parascolopsis eriomma has the specific name capitinis which prefixes eris, meaning "very" with omma, which means "eye", a reference to the very large eye of this species.

== Description ==
Parascolopsis eriomma has its dorsal fin supported by 10 spines and 9 soft rays while the anal fin has 3 spines and 7 soft rays. The scales on the head extend forward to the intraorbital area. The rear margin of the preoperculum is nearly vertical, or angled slightly, and has a scaleless lower limb. The suborbital has a serrated rear margin and has a small spine at its upper angle. It has long pectoral fins which extend to or nearly as far as the anus and the pelvic fins are also long and reach to the level of the anus. This fish has a rosy-coloured back with a diffuse yellow longitudinal band right along the middle of its side. This species has a maximum published total length of 35 cm (14 in).

== Distribution and habitat ==
Parascolopsis eriomma is found in the Indian Ocean from the Red Sea south to KwaZulu-Natal eastwards into the Western Pacific Ocean as far as the Philippines, south to the Arafura Sea and north to southern Japan. It is a benthic species found at depths between 25 and 264 m (82 and 866 ft) over sand and mud substrates.
