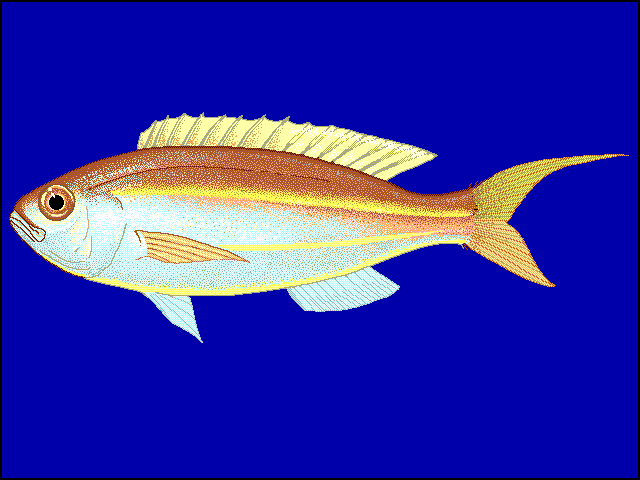

Conservation status
- Least Concern (IUCN 3.1)

Scientific classification
- Kingdom: Animalia
- Phylum: Chordata
- Class: Actinopterygii
- Order: Acanthuriformes
- Family: Nemipteridae
- Genus: Nemipterus
- Species: N. bathybius

Binomial name
- Nemipterus bathybius Snyder, 1911

Synonyms
- Synagris bathybius (Snyder, 1911)

= Yellowbelly threadfin bream =

Species of fish

The yellowbelly threadfin bream (Nemipterus bathybius) is a species of marine ray-finned fish belonging to the family Nemipteridae, the threadfin and whiptail breams. This fish is found in the western Pacific Ocean.

== Taxonomy ==
The yellowbelly threadfin bream was first formally described in 1911 by the American ichthyologist John Otterbein Snyder with its type locality given as Kagoshima in Japan. The 5th edition of Fishes of the World classifies Nemipterus within the family Nemipteridae which it places in the order Spariformes.

== Etymology ==
The yellowbelly threadfin bream has the specific name bathybius, this is a combination of bathy, meaning "deep", and bios, which means "life". The stomach of the specimens examined by Snyder had been everted, an indication that they had been taken in deep water, and this fish is a benthic species found at depths of 40 to 90 m (130 to 300 ft).

== Description ==
The yellowbelly threadfin bream has a depth of body which fits into its standard length between 2.9 and 3.6 times. The length of the snout is slightly less than or equal to the diameter of the eye. There are 3 or 4 pairs of canine-like teeth in the front of the upper jaw. The dorsal fin is supported by 10 spines, while the anal fin contains 3 spines and 7 soft rays. It has long pectoral fins that extend nearly as far as to a point level with the origin of anal fin and the pelvic fins are relatively long, reaching past the anus. The caudal fin is forked with a scythe shaped upper lobe which extends into a filament. The upper body is pinkish and the lowoer body is silvery. There are two horizontal yellow stripes below the lateral line, the higher one running from the operculum to the upper caudal peduncle and the lower one running from the upper part of the base of the pectoral fin to the middle of the caudal peduncle. Another pair of yellow stripes, joined at the front, run from the throat to the lower caudal peduncle, running outside the bases of the pelvic and anal fins. The dorsal fin is pink, with a yellow margin and a middle stripe made up of yellowish wavy lines. The anal fin is transparent, becoming pinkish close to its outer margin and the caudal fin is largely pink with a yellow upper lobe and filament. The pelvic and pectoral fins are translucent, although the pelvic fins have vivid sulphur yellow bases. The maximum published standard length of this fish is 24 cm (9.4 in), although 16 cm (6.3 in) is more typical.

== Distribution and habitat ==
The yellowbelly threadfin bream is found in the Western Pacific Ocean from southern Japan. Korea and Taiwan south to northern Australia. It is a demersal fish found on sandy or muddy substrates at depths between 35 and 300 m (115 and 984 ft).

== Biology ==
The yellowbelly threadfin bream feed on fish, cephalopods and crustaceans as adults while smaller fish feed on copepodds, ostracods and amphipods. This fish is a rudimentary hermaphrodite in which all of the male fish have both functioning testes and some ovarian tissue which they keep for all their life. Spawning has been recorded from June to October in the South China Sea.

== Fisheries ==
The yellowbelly threadfin bream is an important and highly valued food fish in Japan and China where it is heavily targeted by commercial fisheries. In other parts of its range it is mainly caught by artisanal fishers and is sold fresh in fish markets. Despite the heavy commercial exploitation, and some overfishing, of the yellowbelly threadfin bream the IUCN assess it as Least Concern.
