= Parascolopsis tanyactis =

Conservation status
- Least Concern (IUCN 3.1)

Scientific classification
- Kingdom: Animalia
- Phylum: Chordata
- Class: Actinopterygii
- Order: Acanthuriformes
- Family: Nemipteridae
- Genus: Parascolopsis
- Species: P. tanyactis

Binomial name
- Parascolopsis tanyactis B. C. Russell, 1986

Species of fish

Parascolopsis tanyactis, the saddled dwarf monocle bream, longray monocle bream or yellowbellied monocle bream, is a species of marine ray-finned fish belonging to the family Nemipteridae, the threadfin breams. This fish is found in the Eastern Indian Ocean and the Western Pacific Ocean.

== Taxonomy ==
Parascolopsis tanyactis was first formally described in 1986 by the Australian ichthyologist Barry C. Russell with its type locality given as 250 km (160 mi) north-northeast of Larrey Point over the North West Shelf, off Western Australia at depths between 250 and 160 m (820 and 520 ft). The 5th edition of Fishes of the World classifies Parascolopsis within the family Nemipteridae which it places in the order Spariformes.

== Etymology ==
Parascolopsis tanyactis has the specific name tanyactis which is a combination of tanyo, meaning "stretched", and actis, which means "ray", an allusion to the elongated fourth and fifth soft rays of the dorsal fin in adults.

== Description ==
Parascolopsis tanyactis has its dorsal fin supported by 10 spines and 9 soft rays while the anal fin has 3 spines and 7 soft rays. The body of this fish has a depth which averages one third of its standard length. The pectoral and pelvic fins are moderately long, the pectoral fins extend to or near to the anus while the pelvic fins which extend to around the level of the anus. This species' has two dark bars on its back, both diffusing out on the lower side, alongside a dark bar across the tail base. The fourth and fifth dorsal rays are also elongated. This species has a maximum published standard length of 21 cm (8.3 in), although 15 cm (5.9 in) is more typical

== Distribution and habitat ==
Parascolopsis tanyactis is distributed in the eastern Indian Ocean and western Pacific Ocean occurring from southeastern Indonesia and northwestern Australia eastwards to northern Sabah, Malaysia and the central Philippines. This species occurs at depths between 40 and 200 m (130 and 660 ft) over the soft sediments of the continental shelf and slope.
