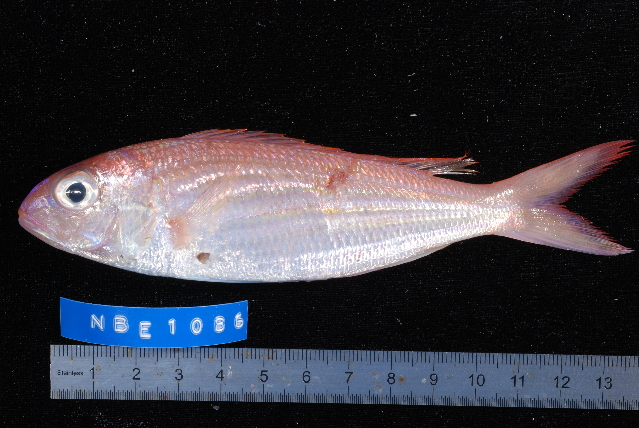

Conservation status
- Least Concern (IUCN 3.1)

Scientific classification
- Kingdom: Animalia
- Phylum: Chordata
- Class: Actinopterygii
- Order: Acanthuriformes
- Family: Nemipteridae
- Genus: Nemipterus
- Species: N. bipunctatus

Binomial name
- Nemipterus bipunctatus (Valenciennes, 1830)

Synonyms
- Dentex bipunctatus Valenciennes, 1830; Synagris bleekeri Day, 1875; Nemipterus bleekeri (Day, 1875); Nemipterus mulloides J. L. B. Smith, 1939; Nemipterus delagoae J. L. B. Smith, 1941

= Nemipterus bipunctatus =

Species of fish

Nemipterus bipunctatus, the Delagoa threadfin bream, Bleeker's threadfin bream or butterfly bream, is a species of marine ray-finned fish belonging to the family Nemipteridae, the threadfin and whiptail breams. This demersal fish is found over soft bottoms in the Indian Ocean.

== Taxonomy ==
Nemipterus bipunctatus was first formally described as Dentex bipunctatus in 1830 by the French zoologist Achille Valenciennes with its type locality given as Jeddah in Saudi Arabia. The 5th edition of Fishes of the World classifies Nemipterus within the family Nemipteridae which it places in the order Spariformes.

== Etymology ==
Nemipterus bipunctatus has the specific name bipunctatus which means "two spotted". This is a reference to the two series of blue dots Valenciennes described along the lateral line.

== Description ==
Nemipterus bipunctatus has a body which is nearly four times as long as it is deep. The snout is around the same length as the diameter of the eye. The dorsal fin is supported by 10 spines and 9 soft rays while the anal fin is supported by 3 spines and 7 soft rays. There is no suborbital spine. It has moderately long pectoral fins, which extend as far as or past the anus, while the pelvic fins are long and reach to the origin of the anal fin. The caudal fin is forked and the lobes are roughly equal in length. There are 3 or 4 pairs of small recirved canine=like teeth in the front of the upper jaw. The upper body is pinkish, fading to silvery on the lower body and ventral surface. There are between 5 and 7 greenish-yellow stripes, curving upwards from the front to the end, beneath the lateral line. T=The snout is marked with 2 vague bluish or purple stripes, one n front of the eyes and the other connecting the upper lip and the eye, The dorsal fin is pale pink with a reddish margin and a yellow stripe below that margin. The anal fin is bluish white with between 2 and 4 wavy yellow stripes, the caudal fin is yellowish pink and the pectoral and pelvic fins are hyaline. This species has a maximum published total length of 30 cm (12 in), although 25 cm (9.8 in) is more typical.

== Distribution and habitat ==
Nemipterus bipunctatus is found in the Indian Ocean from the eastern coast of Africa from the Red Sea, as far north as Israel and Jordan, south to Maputo in Mozambique. across the Indian Ocean, including the Persian Gulf, Madagascar, the Mascarenes, Seychelles, Sri Lanka and the Andaman Sea and Bay of Bengal to the Malacca Straits. The Delagoa threadfin bream is a demersal fish found at depths between 18 and 100 m (59 and 328 ft) over sandy and muddy substrates where they prey on fishes, crustaceans, cephalopods and polychaetes.

== Fisheries ==
Nemipterus bipunctatus is caught using hand lines and bottom trawls. Despite there being a major fishery for this species it is seen in fish markets in low numbers. In Kerala 6% of the total threadfin bream bottom trawl catch in 2010 (total 33,700 t (33,200 long tons; 37,100 short tons)) was Delagoa threadfin bream. It is a bycatch in shrimp trawl fisheries in the Persian Gulf and is the 9th most numerous species in the bycatch in Bahrain.
