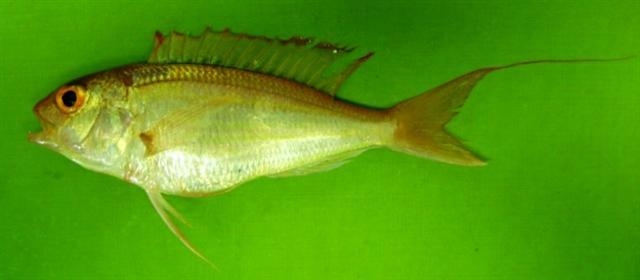

Conservation status
- Least Concern (IUCN 3.1)

Scientific classification
- Kingdom: Animalia
- Phylum: Chordata
- Class: Actinopterygii
- Order: Acanthuriformes
- Family: Nemipteridae
- Genus: Nemipterus
- Species: N. randalli

Binomial name
- Nemipterus randalli Russell, 1986

= Nemipterus randalli =

Species of fish

Nemipterus randalli, or Randall's threadfin bream, is a species of ray-finned fish from the family Nemipteridae, the threadfin breams, which is native to the western Indian Ocean and the Red Sea. It has invaded the eastern Mediterranean by Lessepsian migration through the Suez Canal.

== Taxonomy ==
Nemipterus randalli was first formally described in 1986 by the Australian ichthyologist Barry C. Russell, with its type locality given as the fish market in Bahrain in the Persian Gulf. The 5th edition of Fishes of the World classifies Nemipterus within the family Nemipteridae which it places in the order Spariformes.

== Etymology ==
Nemipterus randalli has a specific name that honours the American ichthyologist John Ernest Randall of the Bishop Museum, who provided Russell with specimens of threadfin breams for his studies.

== Description ==
Nemipterus randalli has a slightly compressed ellipsoid body with a single, continuous dorsal fin composed of 10 spines and 9 soft rays, with its membrane lacking incisions. The anal fin is slightly pointed towards the rear. The caudal fin is forked and has a long filament which extends from the upper edge of its upper lobe, although the filament is frequently missing. The pectoral fin is pointed and long, extending to the anus. The first ray of the pelvic fin is also long and reaches the origin of the anal fin. The mouth is terminal with a single row of conical teeth on both jaws and 5-6 canine-like teeth on premaxilla and the dentary. The body is scaly, even the upper surface of the head down to the midpoint of the eye, and there are three rows of scales on the preoperculum. The body is pinkish in colour, which is darker on the back fading silvery-pink on the belly; there are four pale yellow longitudinal stripes on the flanks, the upper stripe starts at eye level and runs to caudal peduncle. The other three stripes are close to each other and there is a yellow spot on the cheek and another on the operculum. They grow to a maximum length of 30 cm but are normally 5–20 cm. The dorsal fin is pale bluish in colour with a red margin and yellow markings clustered towards the base; the caudal fin also has a red margin.

== Distribution ==
Nemipterus randalli is native to the western Indian Ocean, from Durban, South Africa north to the Red Sea and east through the Persian Gulf to India. It is also found in the Seychelles and off Madagascar. It has also been found in the Andaman Sea and Strait of Malacca. The first record in the Mediterranean was off Haifa, Israel in 2005, with a specimen misidentified as Nemipterus japonicus. It was then recorded off Lebanon, Egypt and southern Turkey. This species is now well established in the Levantine waters of the eastern Mediterranean.

== Biology ==
Nemipterus randalli occurs over open sandy and muddy substrates at depths of 20–200 m in its native range, but in the Mediterranean it is caught mainly at 30–80 m. It feeds mainly on small benthic invertebrates such as polychaetes, crustaceans, cephalopods and molluscs, and small fishes. The rapid spread and increasing abundance of N randalli can result in a reduction of the diversity its prey, especially of benthic decapod crustaceans, with knock-on effects on the native fish communities that prey on these species. The eggs and larvae are planktonic.

== Fisheries ==
Nemipterus randalli is an important target species for local fisheries using small commercial trawlers in the Red Sea and western Indian Ocean. In the Mediterranean, it is already caught in large numbers by trawling and trammel nets and long lines, although to a lesser extent than by trawling, and has potential to be an important commercial species in the future.
