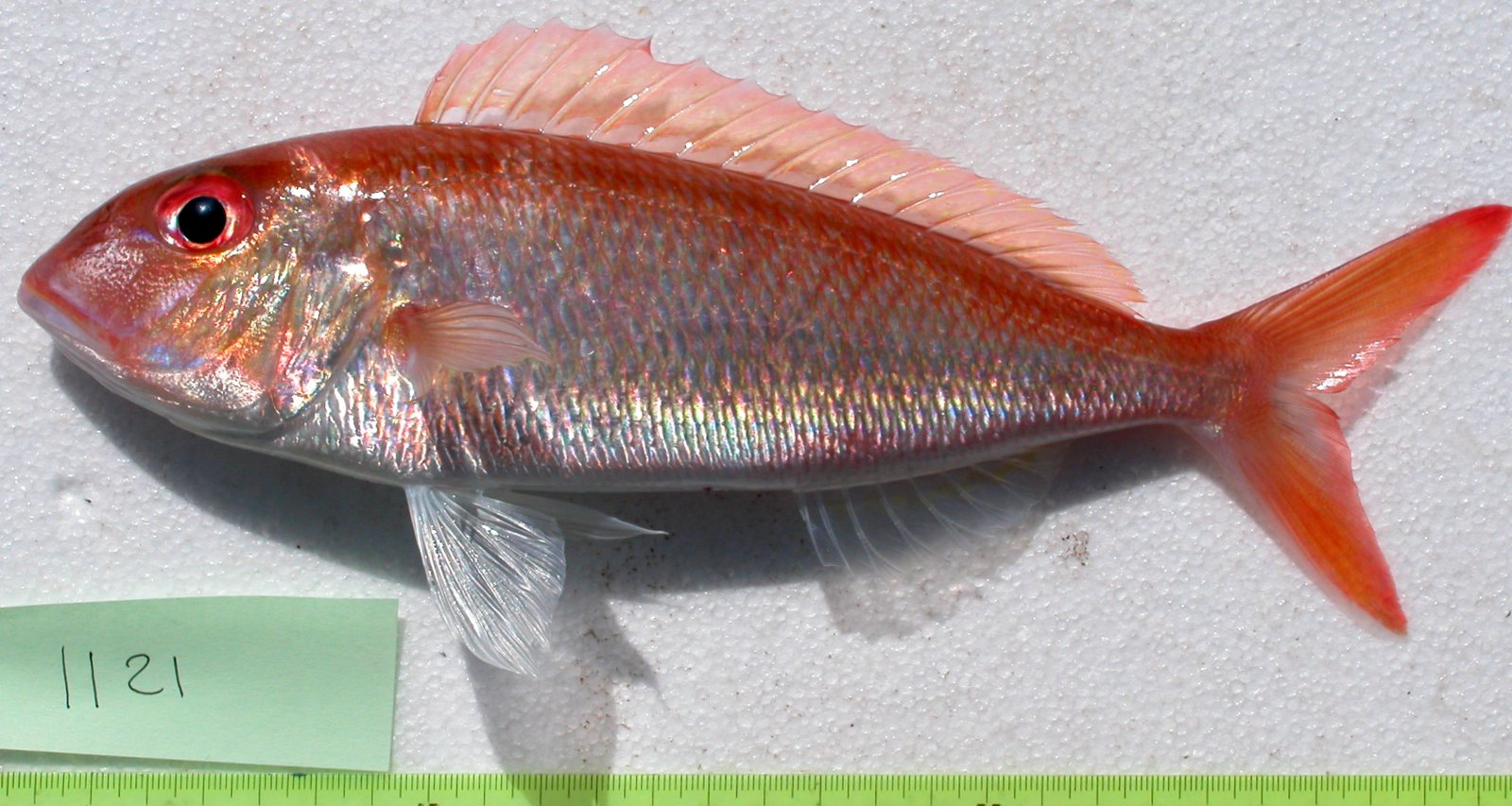
- Nemipterus furcosus

Scientific classification
- Kingdom: Animalia
- Phylum: Chordata
- Class: Actinopterygii
- Division: Teleostei
- Order: Acanthuriformes
- Family: Nemipteridae
- Genus: Nemipterus; Swainson, 1839

Type species
- Dentex filamentosus Valenciennes, 1830

Synonyms
- Anemura Fowler, 1904; Euthyopteroma Fowler, 1904; Odontoglyphis Fowler, 1904; Synagris Günther, 1859

= Nemipterus =

Genus of fishes

Nemipterus is a genus of marine ray-finned fishes belonging to the family Nemipteridae, the threadfin and whiptail breams. These fishes are found in the Indian and Pacific Oceans, but now also occur in the Mediterranean Sea due to Lessepsian migration.

== Taxonomy ==
Nemipterus was first proposed as a monospecific genus in 1839 by the English zoologist William Swainson with Dentex filamentosus, a species described by Achille Valenciennes in 1830 from "Suriname", as its only species. Valenciennes' D. filamentosus has since been determined to be a subjectively invalid name and the valid name is Dentex nematophorus which had been described by Pieter Bleeker from Padang in Sumatra in 1854. The 5th edition of Fishes of the World classifies Nemipterus within the family Nemipteridae which it places in the order Spariformes.

== Etymology ==
Nemipterus is a compound of nematos, meaning "thread", and pterus, which means "fin", and this is a reference to the filaments on the dorsal and caudal fin rays of the type species of Nemipterus, Dentex filamentosus.

== Species ==
There are currently 30 recognized species in this genus:

- Nemipterus aurifilum (J. D. Ogilby, 1910) (Yellow-lip thread-fin bream)
- Nemipterus aurora B. C. Russell, 1993 (Dawn thread-fin bream)
- Nemipterus balinensis (Bleeker, 1858) (Balinese thread-fin bream)
- Nemipterus balinensoides (Popta, 1918) (Dwarf thread-fin bream)
- Nemipterus bathybius Snyder, 1911 (Yellow-belly thread-fin bream)
- Nemipterus bipunctatus (Valenciennes, 1830) (Delagoa thread-fin bream)
- Nemipterus celebicus (Bleeker, 1854) (Celebes thread-fin bream)
- Nemipterus elaine B. C. Russell & Gouws, 2020
- Nemipterus flavomandibularis B. C. Russell & Tweddle, 2013 (Yellow-jaw thread-fin bream)
- Nemipterus furcosus (Valenciennes, 1830) (Fork-tailed thread-fin bream)
- Nemipterus gracilis (Bleeker, 1873) (Graceful thread-fin bream)
- Nemipterus hexodon (Quoy & Gaimard, 1824) (Ornate thread-fin bream)
- Nemipterus isacanthus (Bleeker, 1873) (Tear-drop thread-fin bream)
- Nemipterus japonicus (Bloch, 1791) (Japanese thread-fin bream)
- Nemipterus marginatus (Valenciennes, 1830) (Red-filament thread-fin bream)
- Nemipterus mesoprion (Bleeker, 1853) (Mauve-lip thread-fin bream)
- Nemipterus nematophorus (Bleeker, 1854) (Double-whip thread-fin bream)
- Nemipterus nematopus (Bleeker, 1851) (Yellow-tipped thread-fin bream)
- Nemipterus nemurus (Bleeker, 1857) (Red-spine thread-fin bream)
- Nemipterus peronii (Valenciennes, 1830) (Notched-fin thread-fin bream)
- Nemipterus randalli B. C. Russell, 1986 (Randall's thread-fin bream)
- Nemipterus sugillatus B. C. Russell & H. C. Ho, 2017
- Nemipterus tambuloides (Bleeker, 1853) (Five-lined thread-fin bream)
- Nemipterus theodorei J. D. Ogilby, 1916 (Theodore's thread-fin bream)
- Nemipterus thosaporni B. C. Russell, 1991 (Pale-fin thread-fin bream)
- Nemipterus virgatus (Houttuyn, 1782) (Golden thread-fin bream)
- Nemipterus vitiensis B. C. Russell, 1990 (Fiji thread-fin bream)
- Nemipterus zysron (Bleeker, 1856) (Slender thread-fin bream)

== Characteristics ==
Nemipterus threadfin breams are separated from other Nemipterids by sometimes having scales on the suborbital region and the suborbital bone's margin may be smooth, have small serrations or just a few denticulations. The rear edge of the preoperculum is either smooth or has fine denticulations. If canine-like teeth are present they are only in the front part of the jaws. The scales on the crown extend forwards to or beyond the middle of the eyes and there are scales on the temples. They do not have a suborbital spine and there are 3 transverse rows of scales on the preoperculum. These are medium-sized fishes with the smallest species, N. balinensoides and N. mesoprion, have maximum published standard lengths of 14 cm (5.5 in), while the largest, N. virgatus, has a maximum published standard length of 35 cm (14 in).

== Distribution and habitat ==
Nemipterus threadfin breams are naturally found in the Indian and Western Pacific Ocean. One species, N. randalli, has become established in the Mediterranean Sea, probably entering the sea through the Suez Canal from the Red Sea by Lessepsian migration. They are benthic fishes found at depths down to 300 m (980 ft) but typically in shallower waters. They prefer mud and sand bottoms in coastal areas or on the continental shelf.

== Biology ==
Nemipterus threadfin breams may be solitary or schooling and seem to be non-territorial. They are predators feeding on benthic animals including fishes, crustaceans, polychaetes and cephalopods. There is apparent sexual dimorphism in size with males being larger females smaller. They may be protogynous hermaphrodites or males may grow faster than females. They spawn throughout the year with one or two periods of peak breeding activity.

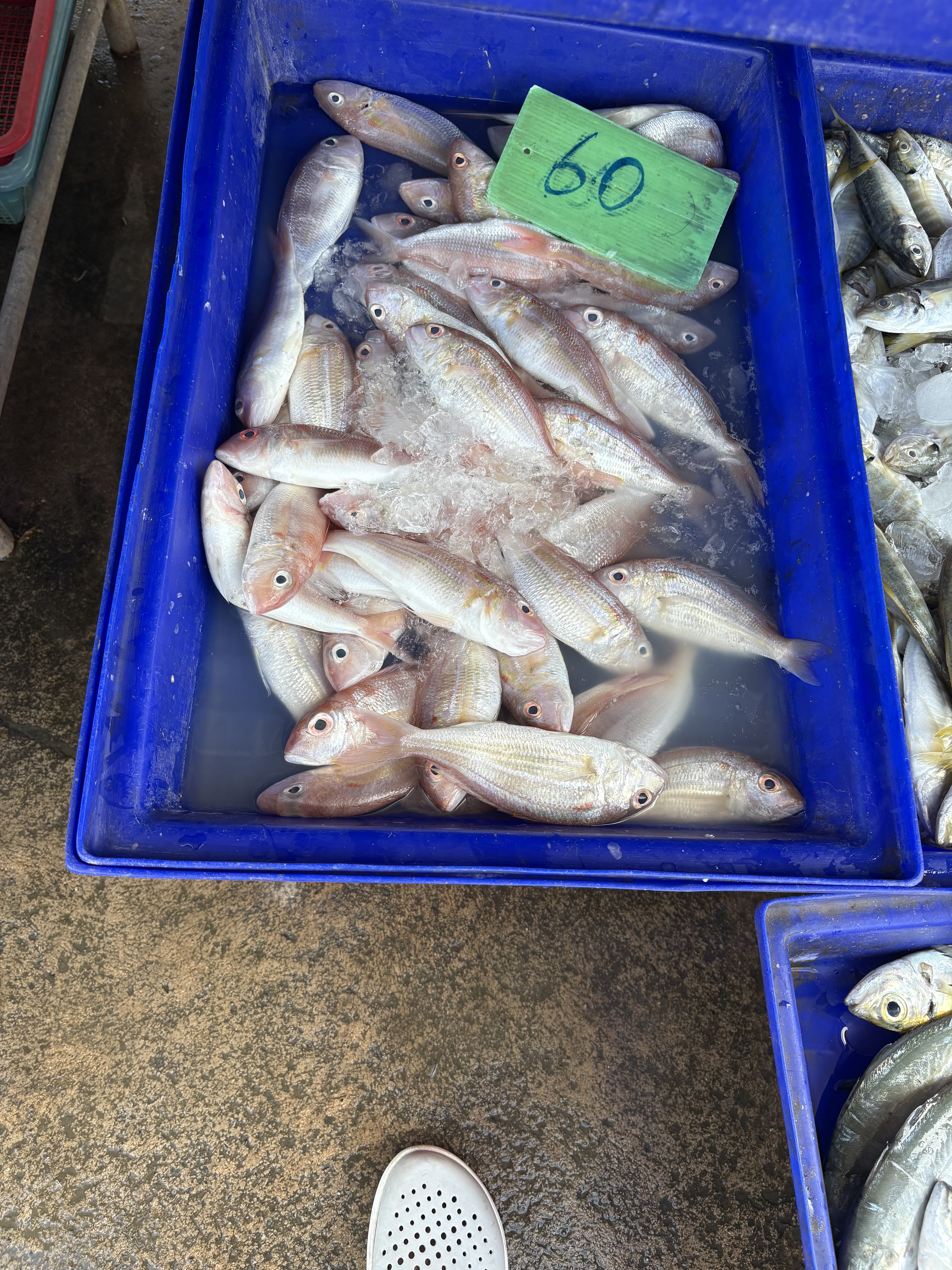
A catch of Nemipterus sp. on sale in a wet market in Thailand

== Fisheries ==
Nemipterus threadfin breams are important targets for commercial and artisianal fisheries throughout their range. The main gear used to catch them is bottom trawl or by handline, but fishers will also use longlines, gill nets, lift nets, surrounding nets, drive-in nets, fish stakes and fish traps. They are food fish and they are sold preserved and processed in various ways. In some areas Nemipterus species are the second or third most targeted fish for fisheries.
