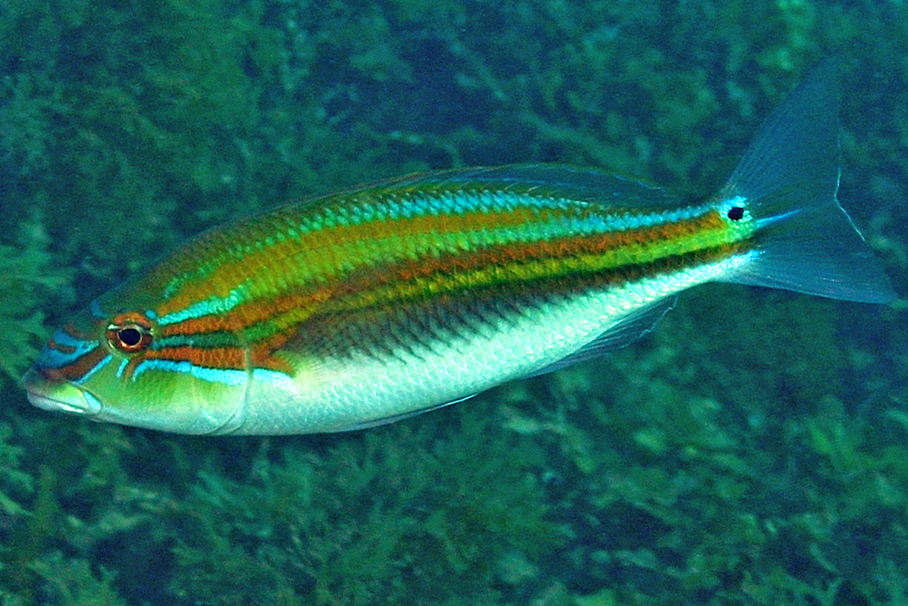

Conservation status
- Least Concern (IUCN 3.1)

Scientific classification
- Kingdom: Animalia
- Phylum: Chordata
- Class: Actinopterygii
- Order: Acanthuriformes
- Family: Nemipteridae
- Genus: Scaevius; Whitley, 1947
- Species: S. milii

Binomial name
- Scaevius milii (Bory de Saint-Vincent, 1823)

Synonyms
- Cantharus milii Bory de Saint-Vincent, 1823; Scolopsis longulus J. Richardson, 1842; Maenoides cyanotaeniatus J. Richardson, 1843; Scaevius nicanor Whitley, 1947

= Scaevius =

Monospecific genus of fish

Scaevius is a monotypic genus of marine ray-finned fish belonging to the family Nemipteridae, the threadfin breams. The only species in the genus is Scaevius milii, the green-striped coral bream, the coral monocle bream or jurgen, is found in Australia.

== Taxonomy ==
Scaevius was first proposed as a monospecific genus in 1947 by the British-born Australian ichthyologist Gilbert Percy Whitley when he described the new species Scaevius nicanor, giving its type locality as Cape Peron in Shark Bay, Western Australia. Whitley's S. nicanor is nor regarded as a junior synonym of Cantharus millii, described by Jean Baptiste Bory de Saint-Vincent from Shark Bay in 1823. The 5th edition of Fishes of the World classifies the genus Scaevius within the family Nemipteridae which it places in the order Spariformes.

== Etymology ==
Scaevius means "left handed" or "western", Whitleydid not explain what this alluded to but it may refer to this fish being found along the coast of Western Australia. The specific name honours Lieutenant Pierre Bernard Milius who became friends with Bory de Saint-Vincent during the 1800 Naturaliste expedition led by Nicholas Baudin, during which the type of this species was collected.

== Description ==
Scaevius has a moderately slender, laterally compressed body. The dorsal fin is supported by 10 spines and 9 soft rays while the anal fin contaons 2 spines and 7 soft rays. The scales on the crown so not extend to the level of the eyes. The snout, suborbital, interorbital and temporal parts of the head are scaleless. The rear edge of the suborbital bears tooth-like projections and has a small spine on its upper angle. The preoperculum is serrated with a scaleless lower limb, the operculum is scaled. and its upper margin has a small, flattened, blunt spine. The short pectoral fins do not extend as far as the level of the anus but the long pelvic fins do extend as far as the level of the anus. The caudal fin is emarginate The crown is dark olive becoming paler on the back, the breast and belly is white. There are 2 blue stripes on snout, the first running from eye to eye through the nostrils and the second running over the front of the snout. There are another 2 thin blue lines underneath eye crossing the suborbital. There is a small dark spot on the upper caudal peduncle. This species has a maximum standard length of 20 cm (7.9 in), although 15 cm (5.9 in) is typical.

== Distribution and habitat ==
Scaevius is found in northwestern Australia and has been recorded from Papua New Guinea. In Australia its range extends from Sweers Island in the Queensland section of the Gulf of Carpentaria east and south to the Houtman Abrolhos in Western Australia. It is found at depths between 1 and 20 m (3 ft 3 in and 65 ft 7 in) on inshore reefs in shallow water and on nearby sandy and muddy areas.

== Biology ==
Scaevius feeds on benthic invertebrates and small fishes. Although this fish is abundant no major fishery exists for it.
