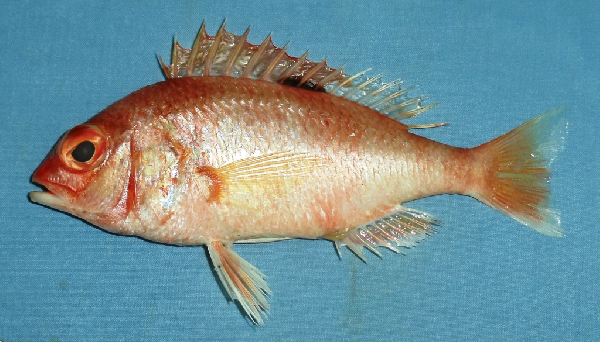
- Parascolopsis aspinosa

Scientific classification
- Kingdom: Animalia
- Phylum: Chordata
- Class: Actinopterygii
- Order: Acanthuriformes
- Family: Nemipteridae
- Genus: Parascolopsis; Boulenger, 1901

Type species
- Parascolopsis townsendi Boulenger, 1901

Synonyms
- Parascolopsoides J. L. B. Smith, 1953

= Parascolopsis =

Genus of fishes

Parascolopsis, the dwarf monocle breams, is a genus of marine ray-finned fishes belonging to the family Nemipteridae, the threadfin breams. These fishes are found in the Indo-Pacific region.

== Taxonomy ==
Parascolopsis was first proposed as a monospecific genus in 1901 by the Belgian-born British ichthyologist George Albert Boulenger when he described its only species, Parascolopsis townsendi from the Sea of Oman. The 5th edition of Fishes of the World classifies Parascolopsis within the family Nemipteridae which it places in the order Spariformes.

== Etymology ==
Parascolopsis is a combination of para, which means "near" and Scolopsis, Boulenger wrote that this genus "agrees in every respect", apart from the absence of a surborbital spine.

== Species ==
The currently recognized species in this genus are:

- Parascolopsis akatamae Miyamoto, McMahan, & Kaneko, 2020
- Parascolopsis aspinosa (M. Rao & S. Rao, 1981) (smooth dwarf monocle bream)
- Parascolopsis baranesi B. C. Russell & Golani, 1993 (Baranes's dwarf monocle bream)
- Parascolopsis boesemani (M. Rao & S. Rao, 1981) (redfin dwarf monocle bream)
- Parascolopsis capitinis B. C. Russell, 1996 (Large-head threadfin bream)
- Parascolopsis eriomma (D. S. Jordan & R. E. Richardson, 1909) (rosy dwarf monocle bream)
- Parascolopsis inermis (Temminck & Schlegel, 1843) (unarmed dwarf monocle bream)
- Parascolopsis melanophrys B. C. Russell & P. K. Chin, 1996 (dwarf monocle bream)
- Parascolopsis qantasi B. C. Russell & Gloerfelt-Tarp, 1984 (slender dwarf monocle bream)
- Parascolopsis rufomaculata B. C. Russell, 1986 (red-spot dwarf monocle bream)
- Parascolopsis tanyactis B. C. Russell, 1986 (long-rayed dwarf monocle bream)
- Parascolopsis tosensis (Kamohara, 1938) (Tosa dwarf monocle bream)
- Parascolopsis townsendi Boulenger, 1901 (scaly dwarf monocle bream)

== Characteristics ==
Parascolopsis differs from the other genera in the family Nemipteridae by the suborbital spine being either poorly developed or absent and by having between 4 and 6 transverse scale rows on the preoperculum. Other characteristics include the second anal fin spine typically being longer and more robust than the spines either side of it. The caudal fin is emarginate. The scales on the crown extend to the middle of the eyes or to rear nostrils. The suborbital region may be scaled or naked and its rear edge may be smooth, toothed or finely serrated. The operculum is scaly with a small, flat, enclosed spine in its upper margin. These are medium-sized fishes with the smallest species, P. tosensis having a maximum published standard lengths of 10 cm (3.9 in), while the largest, P. eriomma, has a maximum published total length of 35 cm (14 in).

== Distribution and habitat ==
Parascolopsis monocle breams are found in the Indian and Pacific Oceans occurring on muddy or sandy substrates, typically in offshore waters of the continental shelf, as deep as around 400 m (1,300 ft).
