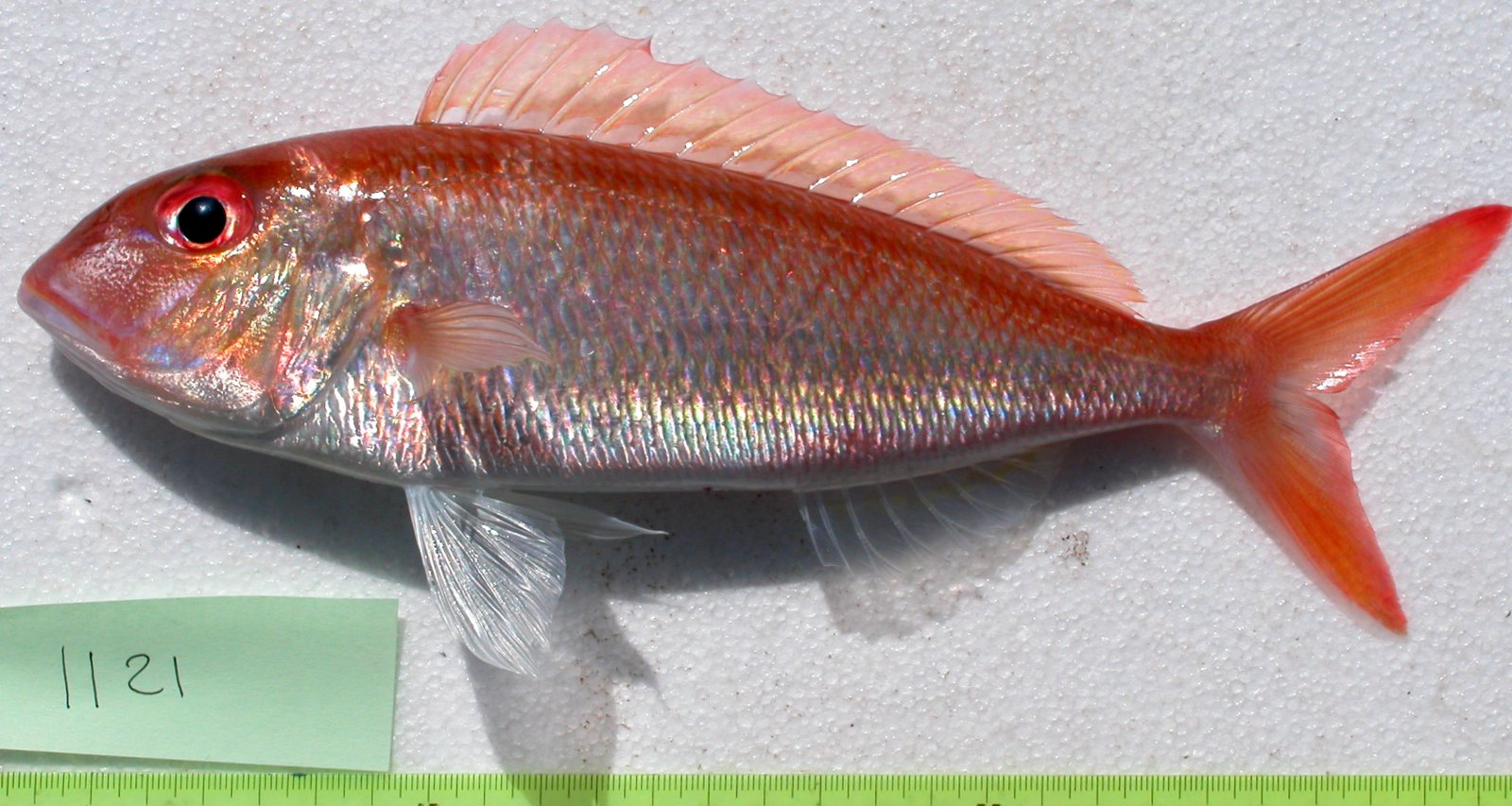

Conservation status
- Least Concern (IUCN 3.1)

Scientific classification
- Kingdom: Animalia
- Phylum: Chordata
- Class: Actinopterygii
- Order: Acanthuriformes
- Family: Nemipteridae
- Genus: Nemipterus
- Species: N. furcosus

Binomial name
- Nemipterus furcosus (Valenciennes, 1830)

Synonyms
- Dentex furcosus Valenciennes, 1830; Dentex upeneoides Bleeker, 1853; Nemipterus upeneoides (Bleeker, 1853); Synagris upeneoides (Bleeker, 1853); Dentex ovenii Bleeker, 1854; Nemipterus ovenii (Bleeker, 1854); Synagris ovenii (Bleeker, 1854); Synagris furcosus Günther, 1859; Dentex hypselognathus Bleeker, 1873; Nemipterus hypselognathus (Bleeker, 1873); Synagris hypselognathus (Bleeker, 1873); Dentex sundanensis Bleeker, 1873; Nemipterus sudanensis (Bleeker, 1873); Nemipterus sundanensis (Bleeker, 1873); Genyorage rubicauda Saville-Kent, 1893; Nemipterus worcesteri Evermann & Seale, 1907; Synagris worcesteri (Evermann & Seale, 1907); Nemipterus robustus Ogilby, 1916

= Nemipterus furcosus =

Species of fish

Nemipterus furcosus, the fork-tailed threadfin bream, rosy threadfin bream or red butterfly bream, is a species of marine ray-finned fish belonging to the family Nemipteridae, the threadfin and whiptail breams. This species is found in the eastern Indian Ocean and western Pacific Ocean.

== Taxonomy ==
Nemipterus furcosus was first formally described as Dentex furcosus by the French zoologist Achille Valenciennes with its type locality given as Trincomalee in Sri Lanka. The 5th edition of Fishes of the World classifies Nemipterus within the family Nemipteridae which it places in the order Spariformes.

== Etymology ==
Nemipterus furcosus has the specific name furcosus which means "furcate", an allusion to the distinctly forked tail of this species.

== Description ==
Nemipterus furcosus has its dorsal fin supported by 10 spines and 9 soft rays while the anal fin contains3 spines and 7 soft rays. Its body has a standard length that is 3 to 3.9 times its depth and it has a snout that is equal to in length or longer than the diameter of the eye. There are 2 or 3 pairs of canine-like teeth in the front of the upper jaw. The pectoral fins and pelvic fins are both of moderate length extending nearly as far or to the anus. The caudal fin has a deep fork. The head and body are a light iridescent pink fading on the flanks to silvery and white on the breast and belly. There are 9 vague crossbars along the back which reach to immediately below the lateral line. The third of these bars is the clearest and darkest and sometimes forms a reddish spot to the rear of the front end the lateral line. There are broken horizontal yellowish stripes on the body, one above the lateral line and the rest below it. The cheeks and gill cover are silvery and the upper jaw is pink with the lower jaw being silvery. The eye is pink. The dorsal fin light pink, and may have a yellowish tinge, with its margin being darker. The anal fin is bluish white marked with a line of transparent or indistinct yellow spots close to its base. The tail is pale pink, with a yellow tint and a white margin. The pelvic fins are white and the pectoral fins are pink. The maximum published standard length of this fish is 24 cm (9.4 in), although 18 cm (7.1 in) is more typical.

== Distribution and habitat ==
Nemipterus furcosus has an Indo-West Pacific range extending from the Maldives, Sri Lanka and the eastern coast of India east to New Caledonia, north to southern Japan and south to northern Australia. There is some confusion between this species and N. peronii and the presence of either species off New Caledonia was still in need of confirmation in 2011. This species is a demersal fish found at depths between 8 and 110 m (26 and 361 ft) in areas of sand or mud substrates and in estuaries.

== Biology ==
Nemipterus furcosus preys largely on crustaceans and smaller fishes, foraging throughout the day. The smaller fishes are predominantly female while the larger fishes tend to be males and there is evidence to suggest that this species is sequentially hermaphroditic. Females with fully developed ova are present throughout the year off northwestern Australia but the numbers of ripe females peaks in November and December. This species has been found to be the host for the following parasites Adlardia novaecaledoniae, Camallanus carangis, Ectenurus trachuri, Lernanthropus nemipteri, Macvicaria jagannathi and Trilobovarium lineatum.

== Fisheries ==
Nemipterus furcosus is a valued food fish which frequently appears in fish markets, they are taken by commercial fisheries using trawls and hand lines. Off the coast of northwestern Australia there was a fishery which trawled, mainly for this species. but this fishery is no longer active.
