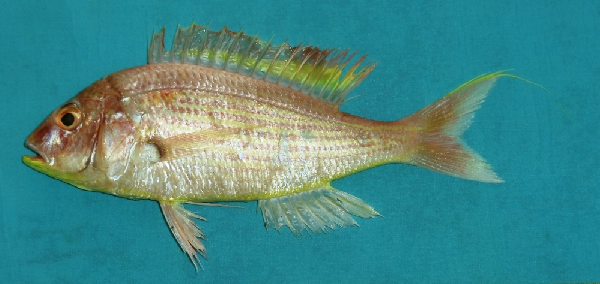
- Pakistan

Conservation status
- Least Concern (IUCN 3.1)

Scientific classification
- Kingdom: Animalia
- Phylum: Chordata
- Class: Actinopterygii
- Order: Acanthuriformes
- Family: Nemipteridae
- Genus: Nemipterus
- Species: N. japonicus

Binomial name
- Nemipterus japonicus (Bloch, 1791)

Synonyms
- Sparus japonicus Bloch, 1791; Nemipterus japonica (Bloch, 1791); Synagris japonicus (Bloch, 1791); Coryphaena lutea Bloch & Schneider, 1801; Nemipterus luteus (Bloch & Schneider, 1801); Cantharus filamentosus Rüppell, 1829; Dentex tambulus Valenciennes, 1830; Dentex striatus Valenciennes, 1830; Dentex blochii Bleeker, 1851; Synagris grammicus Day, 1865; Heterognathodon flaviventris Steindachner, 1866; Synagris flavolinea Fowler, 1931

= Nemipterus japonicus =

Species of fish

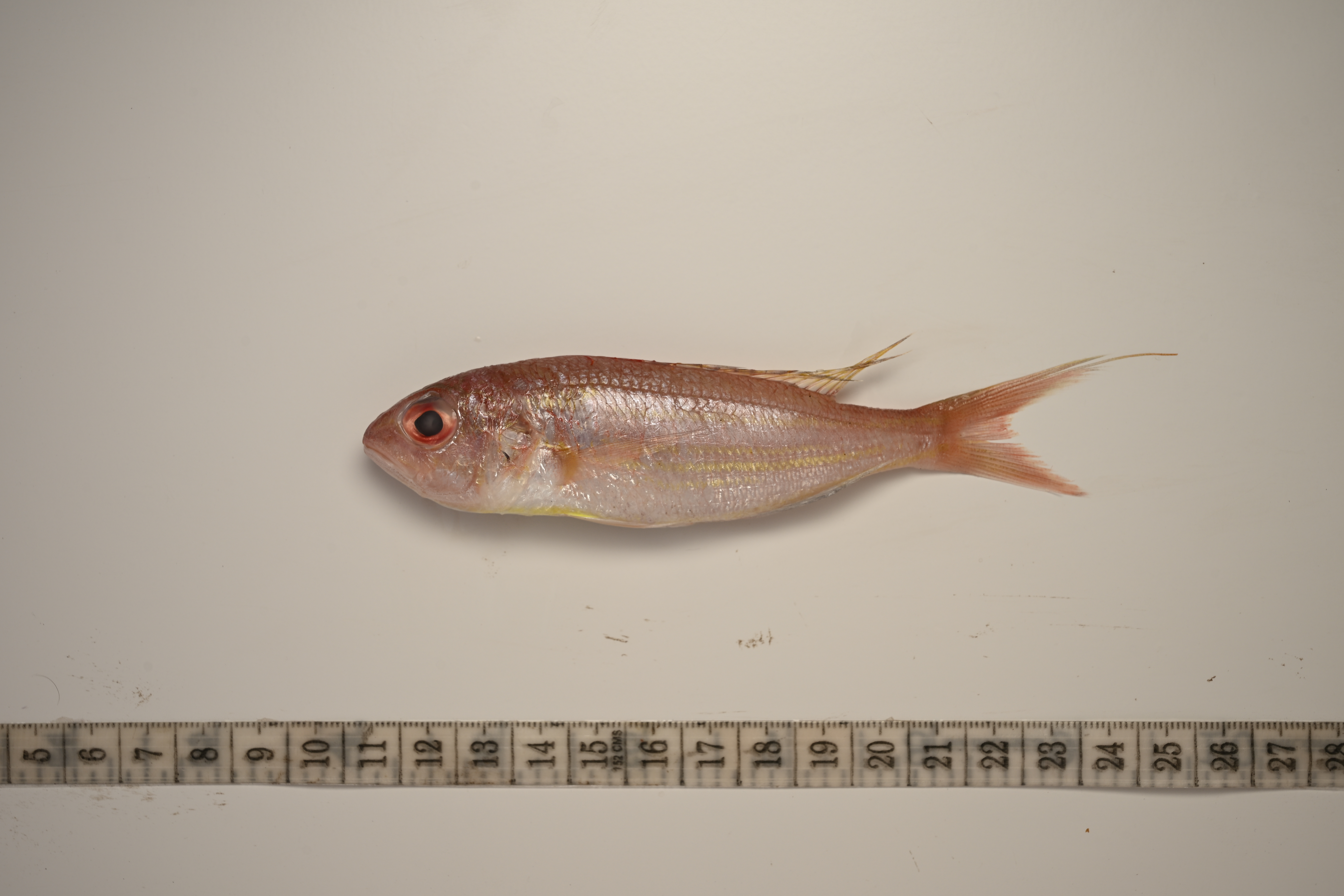
Nemipterus japonicus

Nemipterus japonicus, the Japanese threadfin bream, is a species of marine ray-finned fish belonging to the family Nemipteridae, the threadfin and whiptail breams. This species is found in the Indo Pacific region and is an important food fish.

== Taxonomy ==
Nemipterus japonicus was first formally described in 1791 as Sparus japonicus by the German physician and naturalist Marcus Elieser Bloch with its type locality given as Japan. The 5th edition of Fishes of the World classifies Nemipterus within the family Nemipteridae which it places in the order Spariformes.

== Description ==
Nemipterus japonicus has its dorsal fin supported by 10 spines and 9 soft rays while the anal fin contains 3 spines and 7 soft rays. Its body has a standard length that is 2.7 to 3.5 times its depth and it has a snout that is equal to in length or longer than the diameter of the eye. There are 4 or 5 pairs of canine-like teeth in the front of the upper jaw. The pectoral fins are very long and extend beyond the origin of the anal fin and the pelvic fins are of moderate length extending to or just beyond the anus. The caudal fin has a moderately deep forked shape with the upper lobe slightly longer than the lower and extending into an elongated filament. The colour of the upper body is pinkish changing to silvery on the flanks and ventral surface. The top of the head to the rear of the eye has a golden tint and there are 11 or 12 light yellow horizontal stripes running from behind the head to the caudal peduncle. There is a distinct reddish-yellow blotch underneath the front end of the lateral line. The dorsal fin is whitish with a yellow margin, which has a red edge, and a pale yellow stripe near its base. The anal fin is whitish marked with yellow lines or dashes. The pectoral fins are nearly transparent and pinkish in colour while the pelvic fins are whitish with a yellow axillary scale. The caudal fin is pink with its upper tip and filament being yellow. The maximum published total length of this fish is 34 cm (13 in), although 25 cm (9.8 in) is more typical.

== Distribution and habitat ==
Nemipterus japonicus has a wide Indo-Pacific distribution. Its range extends from the Red Sea south to Tanzania, the Persion Gulf and Gulf of Oman east to the Philippines, north to Japan south to Indonesia and Timor-Leste. The reports of this species as a Lessepsian migrant in the Mediterranean Sea are now thought refer to N. randalli. The Japanese threadfin bream is an abundant demersal species in coastal waters ate depths between 5 and 80 m (16 and 262 ft) over muddy and sandy substrates.

== Biology ==
Nemipterus japonicus is typically encountered in schools. They feed on fishes, crustaceans, molluscs (largely cephalopods), polychaetes and echinoderms. It is a short-lived species which grows quickly and reaches sexual maturity at around a year old.

== Utilisation ==
Nemipterus japonicus is an important target for commercial and artisanal fisheries throughout its range. It is caught by trawling and gill netting. It is consumed by humans as an ingredient of crab sticks. Off Pakistan smaller specimens are ground into fish meal.

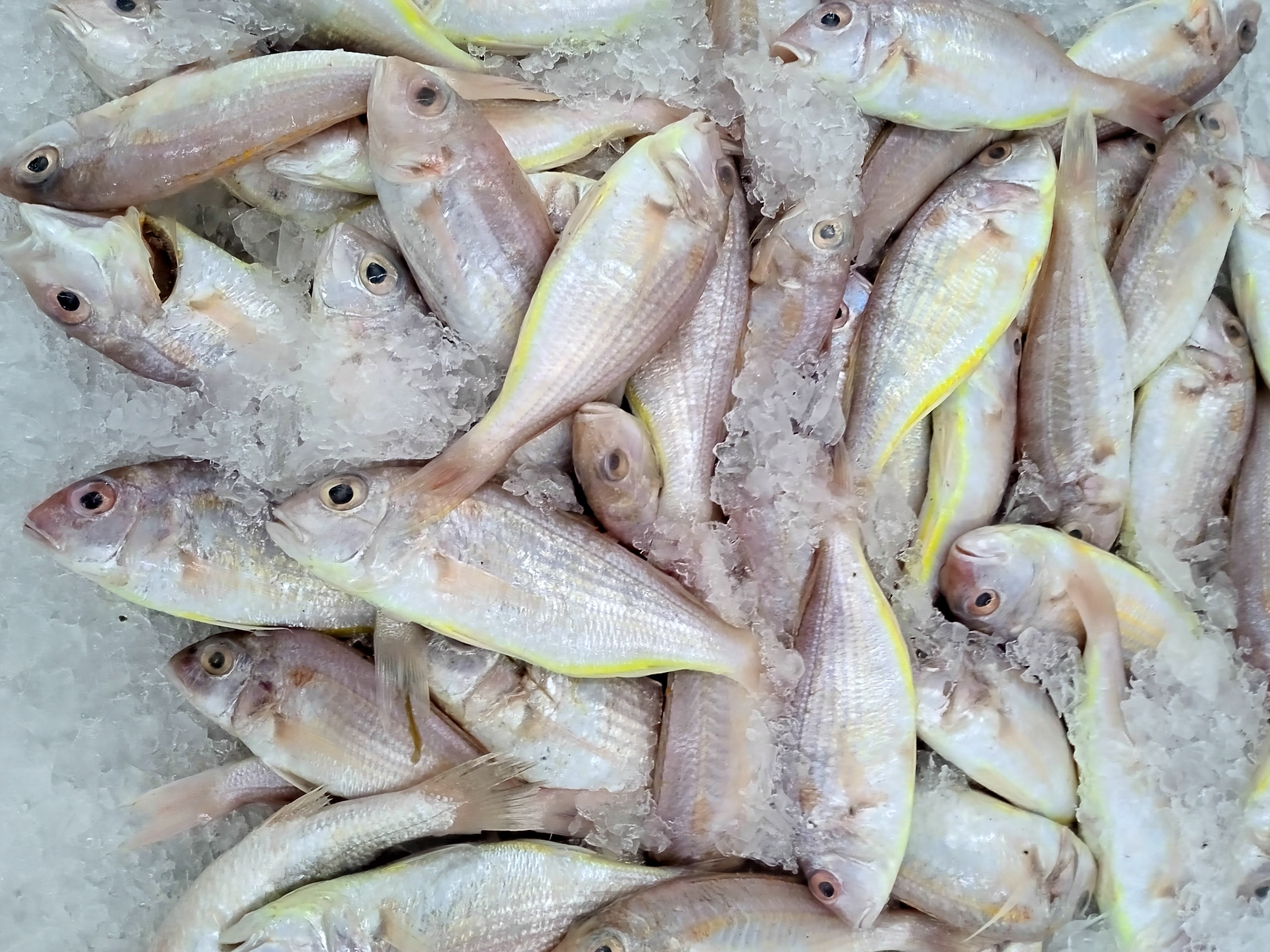
Japanese threadfin bream in a Malaysian fish market

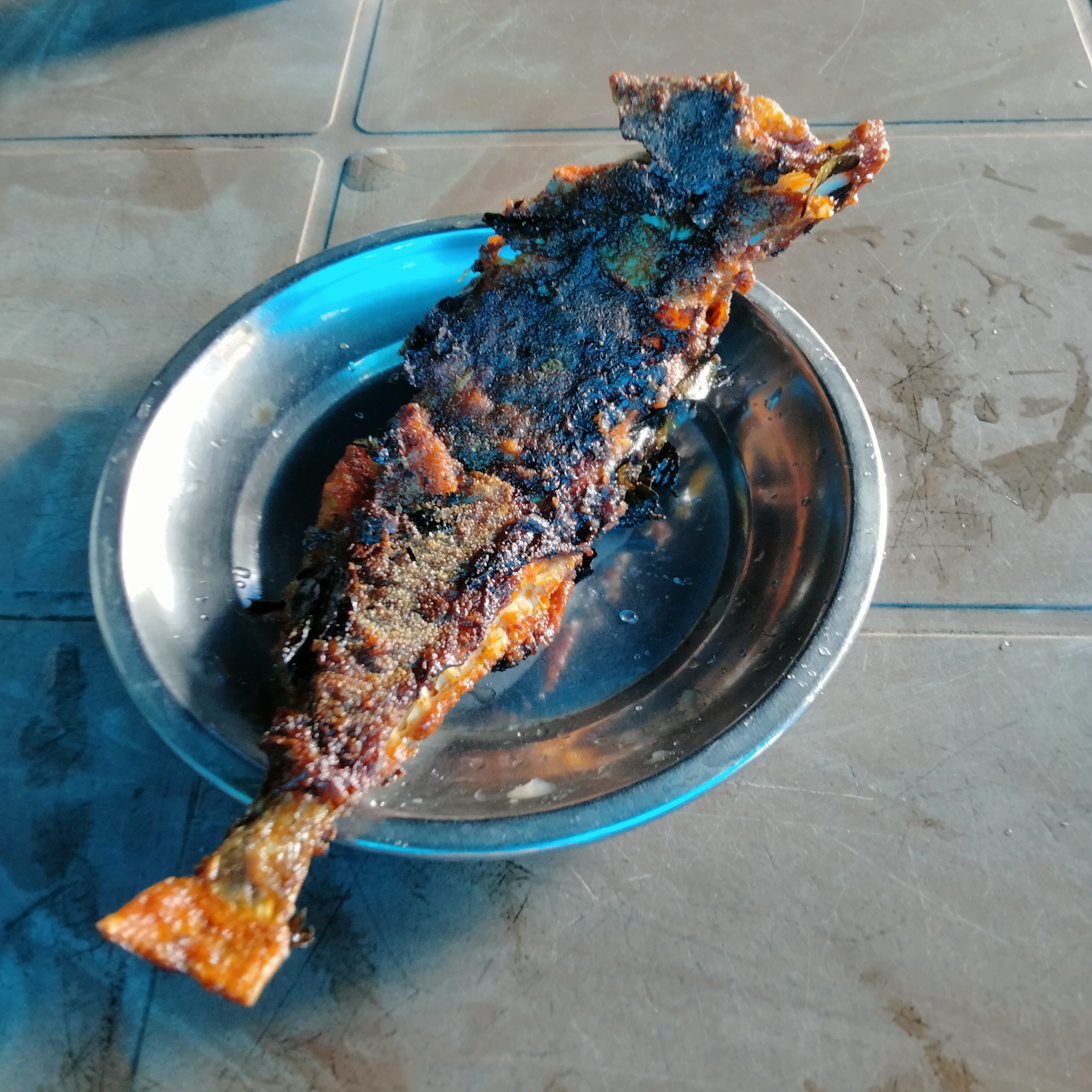
Nemipterus japonicus fry
