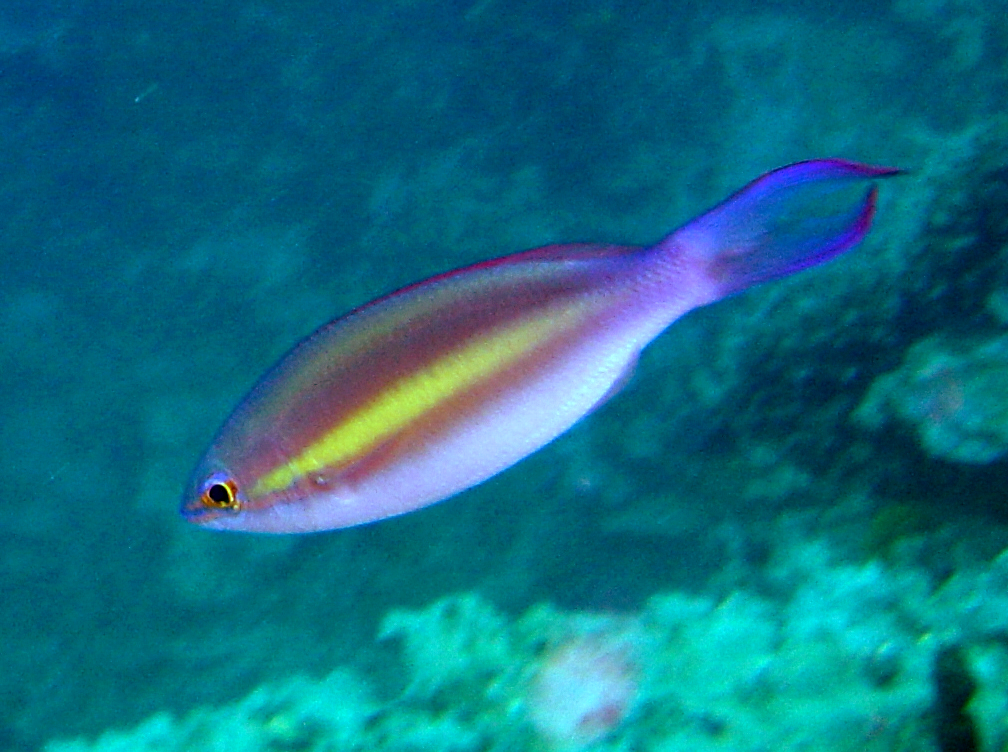
- Double whiptail, Pentapodus emeryii

Scientific classification
- Kingdom: Animalia
- Phylum: Chordata
- Class: Actinopterygii
- Order: Acanthuriformes
- Family: Nemipteridae; Regan, 1913

Genera
- see text

= Nemipteridae =

Family of ray-finned fishes

Nemipteridae, the threadfin breams, whiptail breams, is a family of marine ray-finned fishes belonging to the order Spariformes. These fishes are found in the Indo-West Pacific region.

== Taxonomy ==
Nemipteridae was first proposed as a family in 1913 by the English ichthyologist Charles Tate Regan with the genera Heterognathodes, Nemipterus and Scolopsis included in the family. Traditionally this family has been classified within the Perciformes, as part of the group of families some authorities called the "Sparoid lineage", this included the families Centrarchidae, Nemipteridae, Lethrinidae and Sparidae. Molecular phylogenetics as used in more modern classifications has meant that the Spariformes is recognised as a valid order within the Percomorpha containing six families, with the Centrarchidae retained in the Perciformes, and Callanthidae, Sillaginidae and Lobotidae included. Other workers have found that the Centrarchidae is synonymous with Sparidae and that the Spariformes contains only the remaining three families of the "Sparoid lineage".

== Etymology ==
Nemipteridae has Nemipterus as its type genus and this name is a compound of nematos, meaning "thread", and pterus, which means "fin", and this is a reference to the filaments on the dorsal and caudal fin rays of the type species of Nemipterus, Dentex filamentosus.

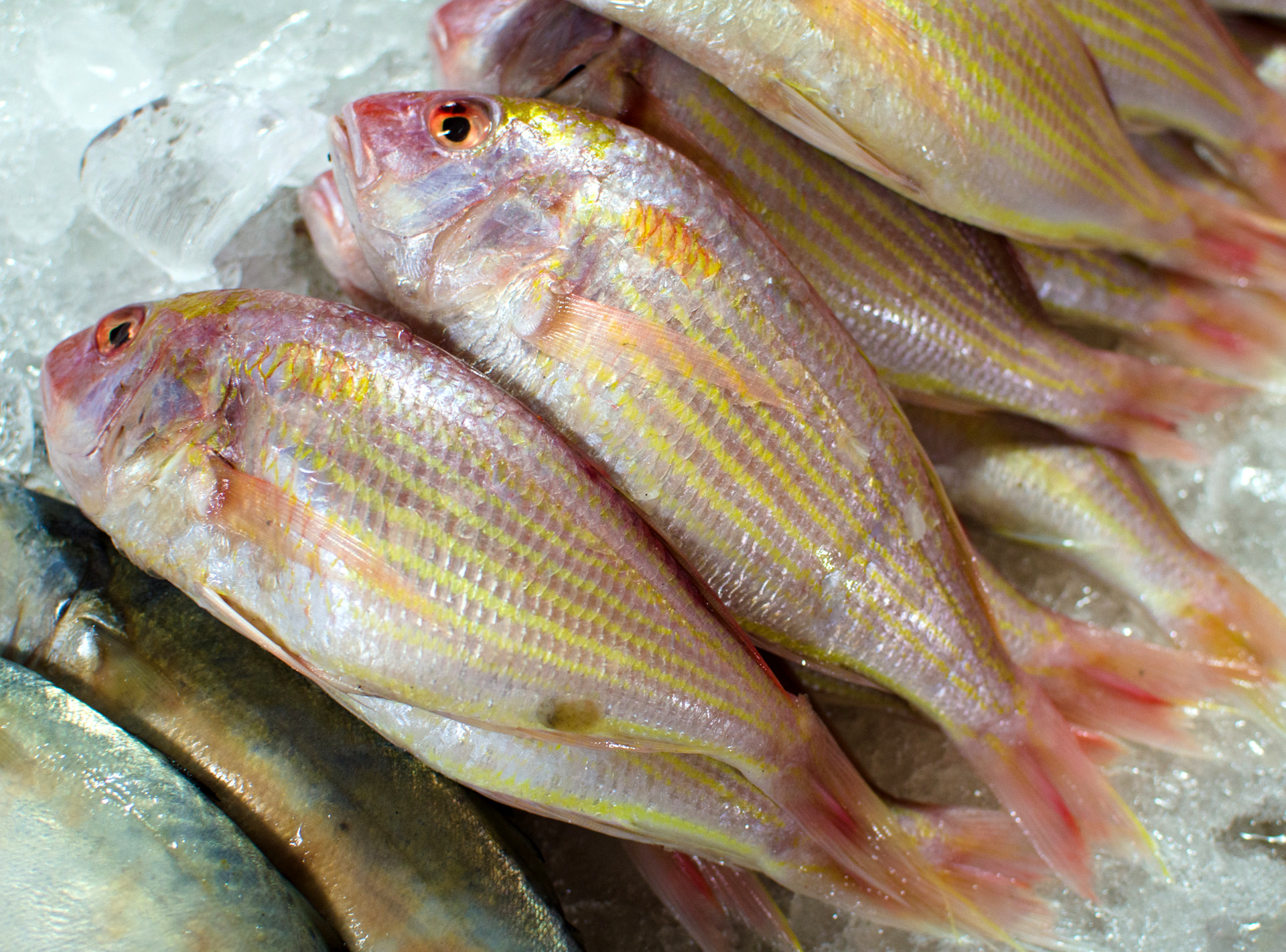
Ornate threadfin bream (Nemipterus hexodon) is often eaten deep-fried in Thai cuisine

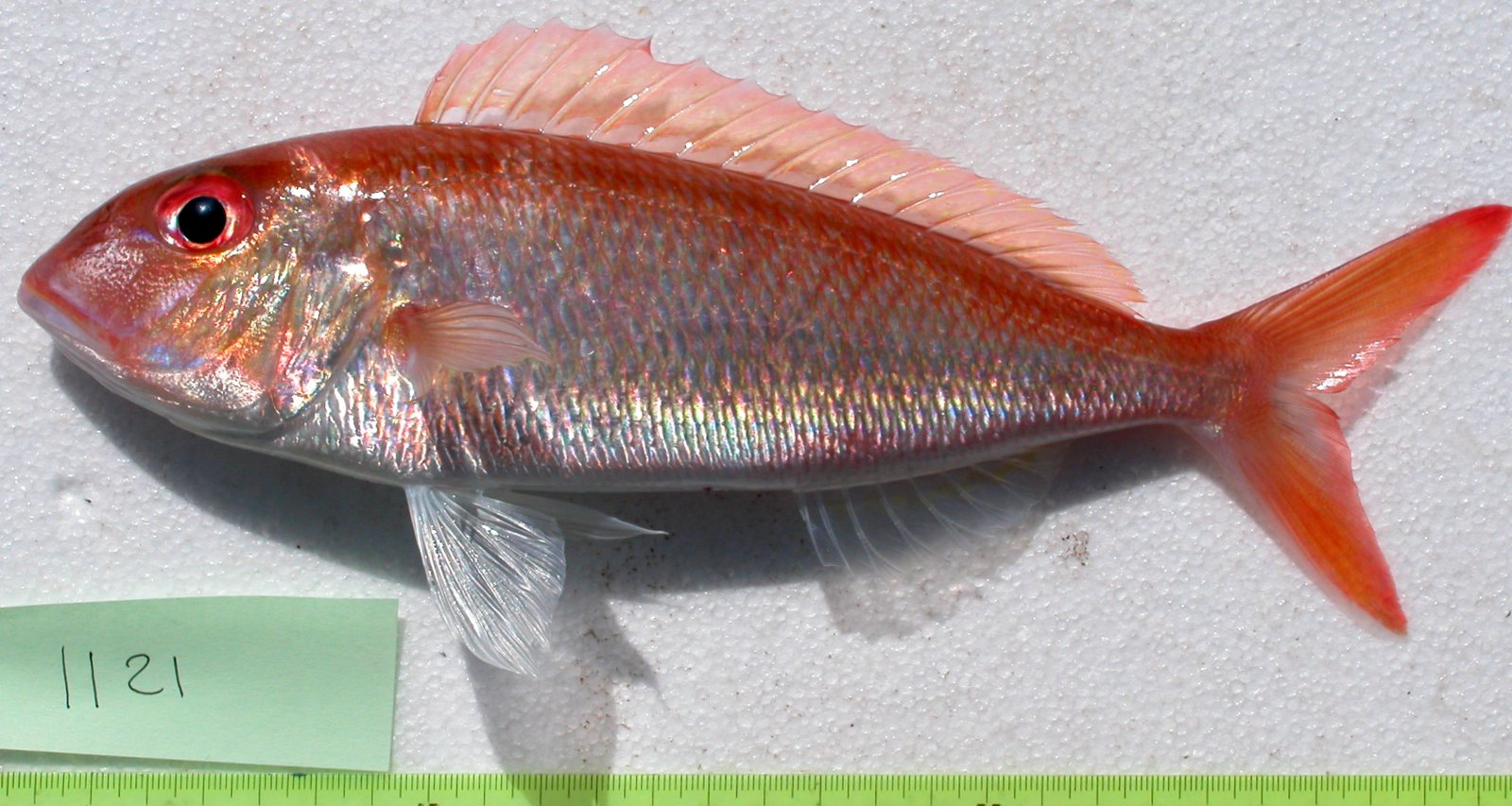
Fork-tailed threadfin bream (Nemipterus furcosus) from off New Caledonia

== Genera ==
Nemipteridae contains the following genera (including about 77 species):

- Nemipterus Swainson, 1839
- Parascolopsis Boulenger, 1901
- Pentapodus Quoy & Gaimard, 1824
- Scaevius Whitley, 1947
- Scolopsis Cuvier, 1814

== Characteristics ==
Nemipteridae species are characterised by having a continuous dorsal fin which is supported by 10 spines and 9 soft rays while the anal fin is supported by 3 spines and 7 or 8 soft rays. In some species there is long filament growing out of the upper lobe of the caudal fin. Some species, especially in Scolopsis are protogynous hermaphrodites. These fishes vary in size from the redfin dwarf monocle bream (Parascolopsis boesemani), with a maximum published standard length of 17 cm (6.7 in), to the monogrammed monocle bream (Scolopsis monogramma) which has a maximum published total length of 38 cm (15 in).

== Distribution, habitat and biology ==
Nemipteridae fishes are found in the Indo-West Pacific. Two species, Nemipterus japonicus and Nemipterus randalli have reached the Mediterranean Sea from the Red Sea, likely by Lessepsian migration through the Suez Canal. These are typically predatory fish feeding on benthic animals including fishes, crustaceans, polychaetes and cephalopods, however, some feed on zooplankton.

== Utilisation ==
Nemipteridae fishes are important parts of the catches of commercial and artisinal fisheries in the Indian and Pacific Oceans. They are not normally found in the aquarium trade.
