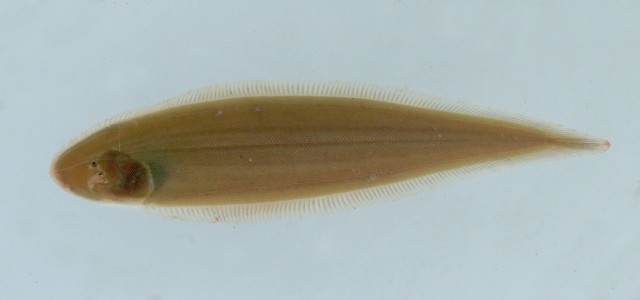

Conservation status
- Least Concern (IUCN 3.1)

Scientific classification
- Kingdom: Animalia
- Phylum: Chordata
- Class: Actinopterygii
- Order: Carangiformes
- Suborder: Pleuronectoidei
- Family: Cynoglossidae
- Genus: Cynoglossus
- Species: C. microlepis

Binomial name
- Cynoglossus microlepis (Bleeker, 1851)

Synonyms
- Plagusia microlepis Bleeker, 1851

= Cynoglossus microlepis =

Species of fish

Cynoglossus microlepis, commonly known as the smallscale tonguefish, is a species of tonguefish. It is indigenous to the Indo-Pacific region, inhabiting freshwater areas with muddy or sandy bottoms, from Thailand to Vietnam, Borneo, and Sumatra. (Note: Tonguefish are called "yot muang" (ยอดม่วง, pronounced [jôːt mŭaŋ]) in Thai for their mango-leaf shape. While sole or flatfish are called "lin ma" (ลิ้นหมา, pronounced [lín mǎː], lit. 'dog tongue'). The names can sometimes overlap.)

It has three lateral lines on the upper side of the body that extend continuously to the head. The body is light reddish-brown without any patterns, with fins that are relatively transparent. The underside is white. The average size is about 25 cm (9.8 in), with the maximum recorded length of approximately 30 cm (12 in).

In Thailand, it occurs in the lower reaches of the Mae Klong, Chao Phraya, Pa Sak, and Bang Pakong rivers, as well as in the southern region. It is most abundant in the Chao Phraya River, from Chainat up to Phitsanulok Provinces.

It is commonly processed into dried fish for consumption and commands a relatively high market price. In general, it is not commonly found, it's already rare to begin with, and can only be found during the winter season (October to early December). Local fishermen set traps across the river overnight and return the following morning to collect the catch.

In addition to being consumed as food, this species is also collected and sold as an aquarium fish, similar to other related species such as the river tonguesole (C. feldmanni) in the same family and Brachirus panoides, or B. harmandi in the true sole family.
