= Cynoglossus gilchristi =

Scientific classification
- Domain: Eukaryota
- Kingdom: Animalia
- Phylum: Chordata
- Class: Actinopterygii
- Order: Carangiformes
- Suborder: Pleuronectoidei
- Family: Cynoglossidae
- Genus: Cynoglossus
- Species: C. gilchristi

Binomial name
- Cynoglossus gilchristi Regan, 1920

Species of fish

Cynoglossus gilchristi, commonly known as the ripplefin tongue sole is a species of tonguefish. It is commonly found in the western Indian Ocean off Delagoa Bay, Mozambique, South Africa, and Madagascar.
