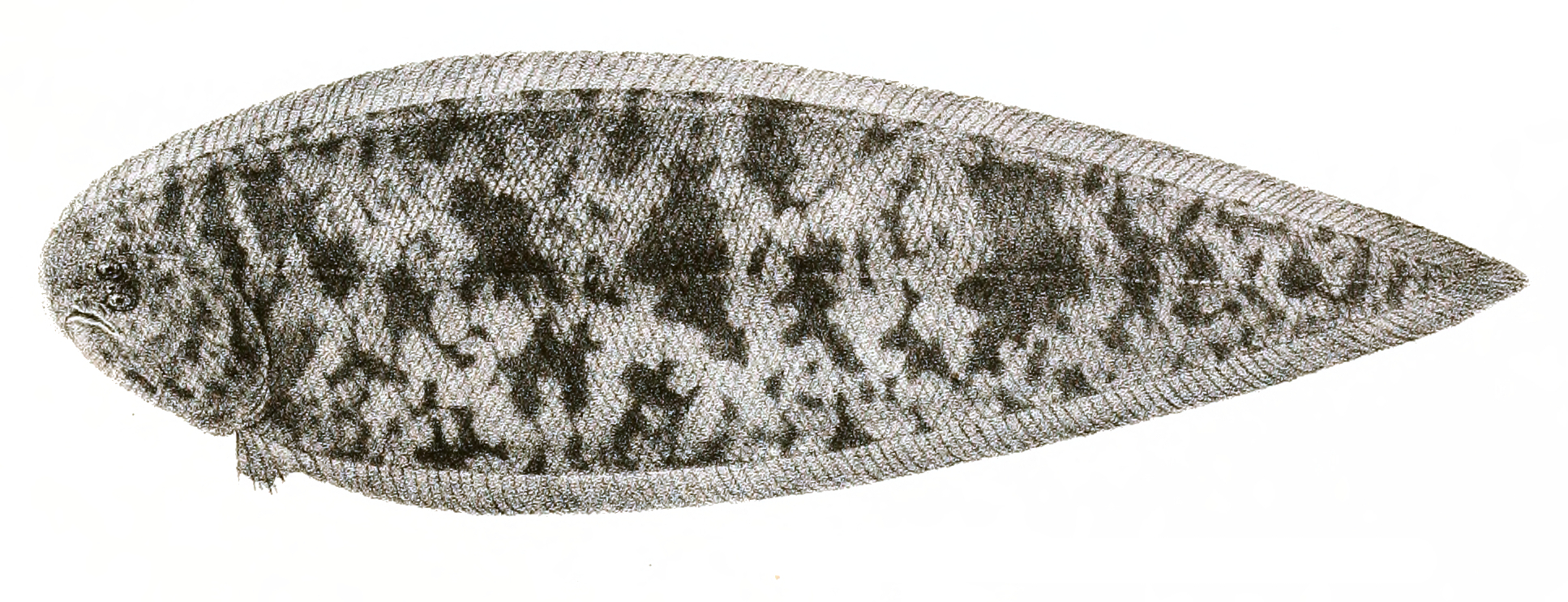

Scientific classification
- Kingdom: Animalia
- Phylum: Chordata
- Class: Actinopterygii
- Order: Carangiformes
- Suborder: Pleuronectoidei
- Family: Cynoglossidae
- Genus: Cynoglossus
- Species: C. dispar

Binomial name
- Cynoglossus dispar F. Day, 1877

= Cynoglossus dispar =

Species of fish

Cynoglossus dispar, commonly known as the roundhead tonguesole is a species of tonguefish. It is commonly found in the Indian Ocean, particularly off the coast of India, and Pakistan.
