= Cynoglossus abbreviatus =

Scientific classification
- Domain: Eukaryota
- Kingdom: Animalia
- Phylum: Chordata
- Class: Actinopterygii
- Order: Carangiformes
- Suborder: Pleuronectoidei
- Family: Cynoglossidae
- Genus: Cynoglossus
- Species: C. abbreviatus

Binomial name
- Cynoglossus abbreviatus (Gray, 1834)

Synonyms
- Plagusia abbreviata Gray, 1834; Areliscus abbreviatus (Gray, 1834); Trulla abbreviata (Gray, 1834)

Species of fish

Cynoglossus abbreviatus, commonly known as the three-lined tongue sole, is a species of tonguefish. It is indigenous to the coast of the South China Sea, commonly found in shallow muddy or sandy waters along the coast of China, Taiwan, Korea and Japan.
