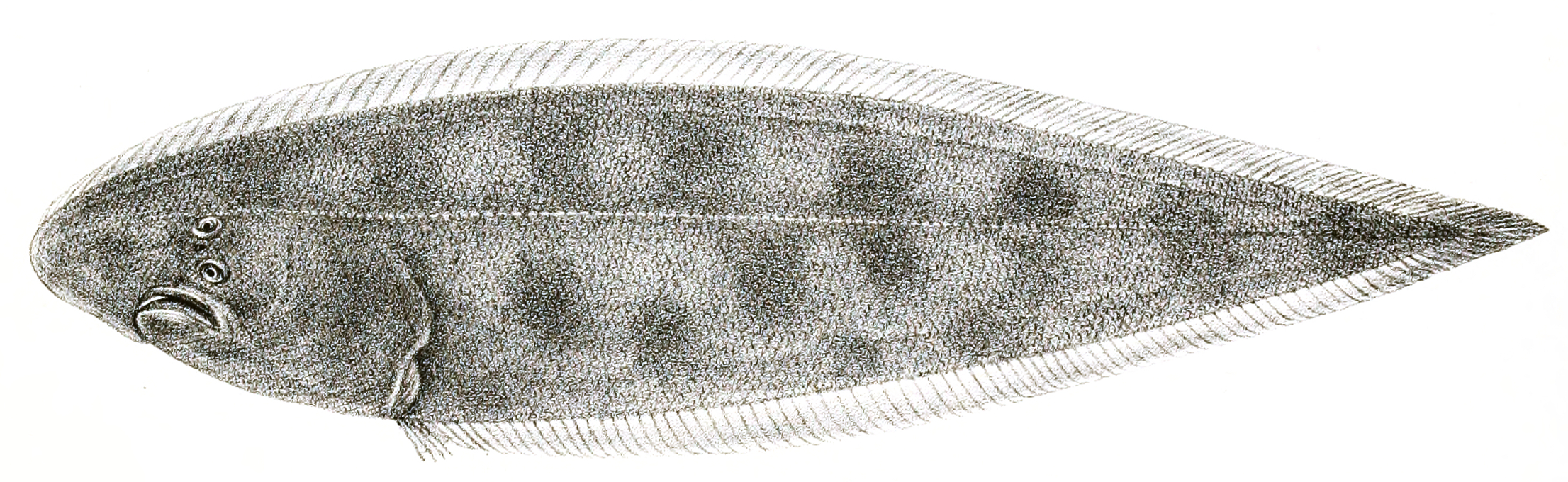

Scientific classification
- Kingdom: Animalia
- Phylum: Chordata
- Class: Actinopterygii
- Order: Carangiformes
- Suborder: Pleuronectoidei
- Family: Cynoglossidae
- Genus: Cynoglossus
- Species: C. dubius

Binomial name
- Cynoglossus dubius Day, 1873

= Cynoglossus dubius =

Species of fish

Cynoglossus dubius, commonly known as the Carrot tonguesole is a species of tonguefish. It is commonly found in the Indian Ocean off the coast of India.
