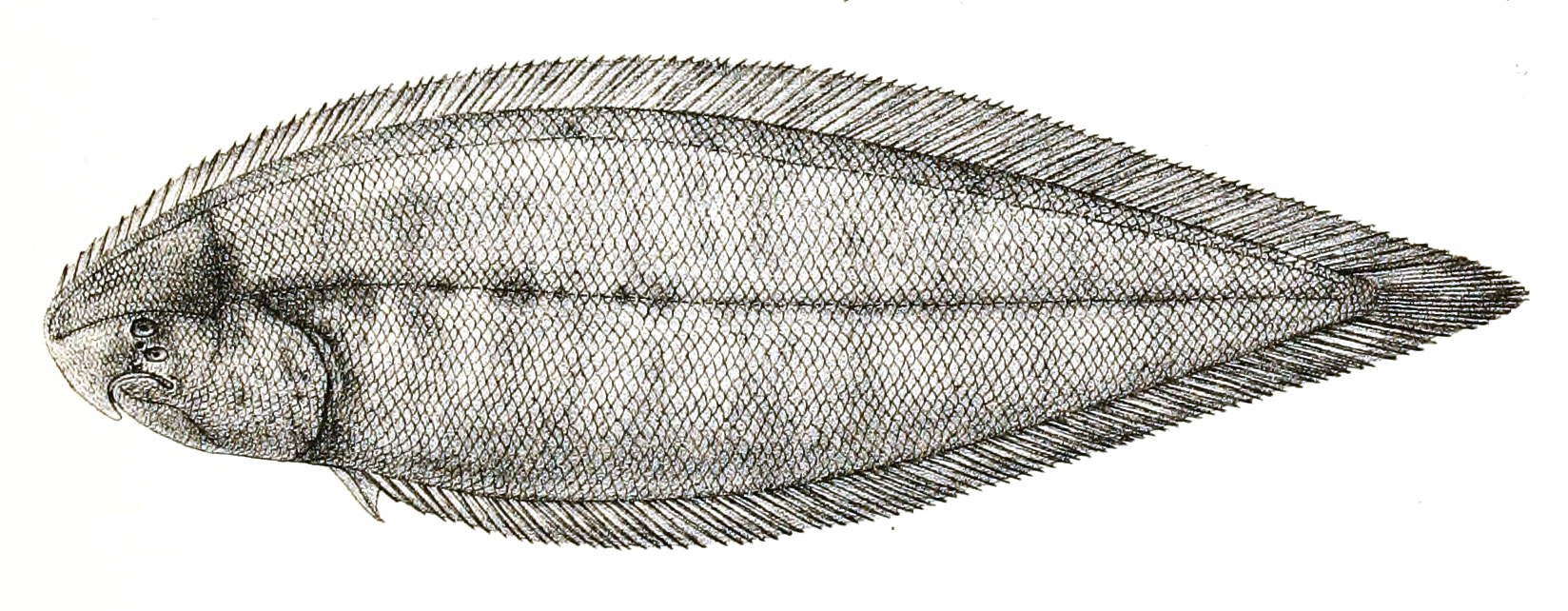
- Bengal tonguesole, Cynoglossus cynoglossus

Scientific classification
- Kingdom: Animalia
- Phylum: Chordata
- Class: Actinopterygii
- Order: Carangiformes
- Suborder: Pleuronectoidei
- Family: Cynoglossidae
- Genus: Cynoglossus
- Species: C. cynoglossus

Binomial name
- Cynoglossus cynoglossus (F. Hamilton, 1822)

Synonyms
- Achirus cynoglossus Hamilton, 1822; Icania cynoglossa (Hamilton, 1822); Plagusia cynoglossus (Hamilton, 1822); Plagusia oxyrhynchos Bleeker, 1851; Arelia oxyrhynchos (Bleeker, 1851); Cynoglossus oxyrhynchos (Bleeker, 1851); Plagusia bengalensis Bleeker, 1853; Cynoglossus bengalensis (Bleeker, 1853); Plagusia sumatrana Bleeker, 1854; Arelia sumatrensis (Bleeker, 1854); Cynoglossus sumatranus (Bleeker, 1854); Cynoglossus sumatrensis (Bleeker, 1854); Cynoglossus hamiltonii Günther, 1862; Cynoglossus buchanani Day, 1870; Cynoglossus deltae Jenkins, 1910

= Cynoglossus cynoglossus =

Species of fish

Cynoglossus cynoglossus, commonly known as the Bengal tonguesole, sometimes called the Gangetic tongue sole, is a species of tonguefish. It is commonly found in the Indian Ocean, particularly in brackish water and muddy or sandy bottoms off the coast of India, Bangladesh and Burma east to the Philippines.

It reaches a length between 12.5 cm and 20 cm (4.9–7.9 in). The dorsal soft rays number between 95 and 102, and the anal soft rays between 72 and 78. It feeds on benthic invertebrates.
