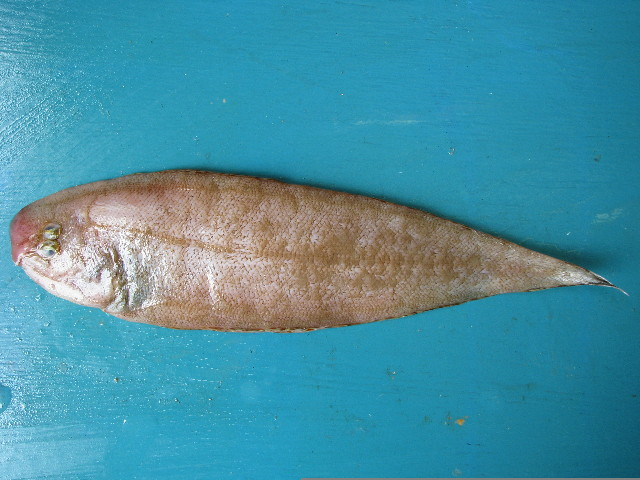

Scientific classification
- Kingdom: Animalia
- Phylum: Chordata
- Class: Actinopterygii
- Order: Carangiformes
- Suborder: Pleuronectoidei
- Family: Cynoglossidae
- Genus: Cynoglossus
- Species: C. capensis

Binomial name
- Cynoglossus capensis (Kaup, 1858)

Synonyms
- Trulla capensis Kaup, 1858; Areliscus microphthalmus von Bonde, 1922; Cynoglossus microphthalmus (von Bonde, 1922); Trulla microphthalmus (von Bonde, 1922)

= Cynoglossus capensis =

Species of fish

Cynoglossus capensis, commonly known as the sand tonguesole, is a species of tonguefish.

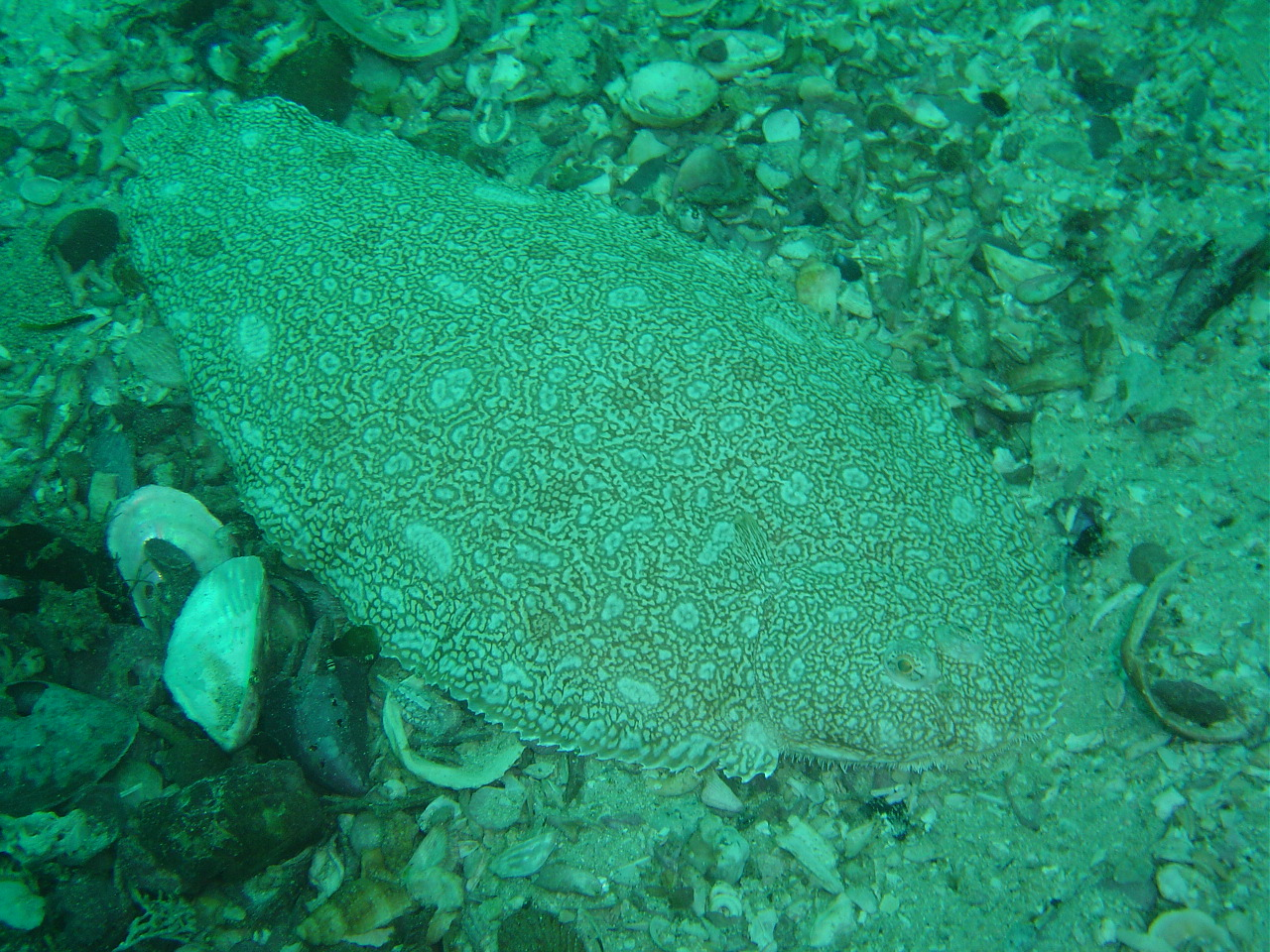
Sand tonguefish at A-Frame, False Bay, South Africa

== Description ==
This slender wish grows up to 30 cm (12 in) long. It is pale brown with small brown spots and blotches, with paler sections in between. This colouration allows it to blend into the sea floor. As with other tonguefishes, the eyes are both on the left side of the body.

=== Similar species ===
This species may be confused with Cynoglossus zanzibarensis, which has red spots on the dorsal and anal fins.

== Distribution and habitat ==
It is commonly found in southeastern Atlantic Ocean off the south western coast of Africa from the Cunene River to the Cape of Good Hope. It is normally found at depths of no greater than 100 m (330 ft), but it has also been reported on the continental slope. It has been recorded at depths of up to 450 m (1,480 ft). It is most common in areas where the sea floor is covered in fine sand or mud.

== Ecology ==
The sand tonguefish feeds on benthic invertebrates. It is known to be an important prey species for the cape fur seal around Plettenberg Bay.

== Fisheries ==
This species is targeted by sole fisheries, as well as being caught as bycatch by other demersal trawl fisheries.

== Conservation ==
This species is currently listed as being data deficient by the IUCN.
