= Cynoglossus suyeni =

Scientific classification
- Kingdom: Animalia
- Phylum: Chordata
- Class: Actinopterygii
- Order: Carangiformes
- Suborder: Pleuronectoidei
- Family: Cynoglossidae
- Genus: Cynoglossus
- Species: C. suyeni

Binomial name
- Cynoglossus suyeni Fowler, 1934

Species of fish

Cynoglossus suyeni, also known as the Suyen's Tongue Sole, is a species of tonguefish. It is indigenous to the Indo-West Pacific region, found along the coast of the Philippines through Celebes, to the Timor Sea and less common off Taiwan.
