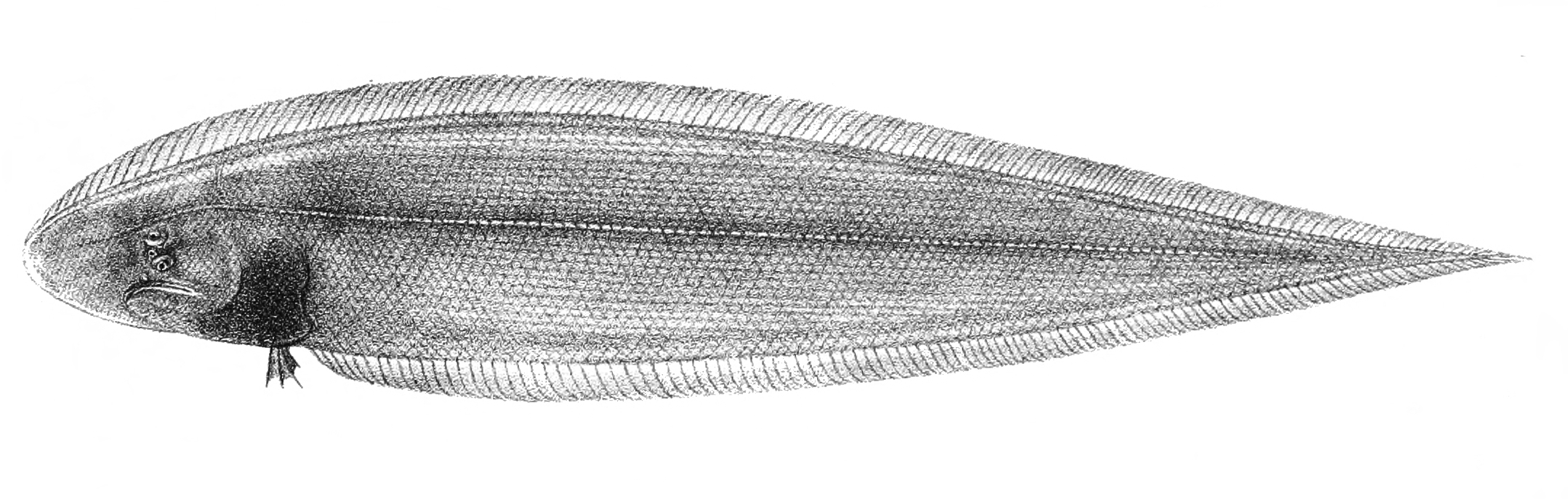
- The original plates showed the fishes facing right and have been flipped here.

Scientific classification
- Kingdom: Animalia
- Phylum: Chordata
- Class: Actinopterygii
- Order: Carangiformes
- Suborder: Pleuronectoidei
- Family: Cynoglossidae
- Genus: Cynoglossus
- Species: C. lingua

Binomial name
- Cynoglossus lingua Hamilton, 1822

= Cynoglossus lingua =

Species of Actinopterygii

Cynoglossus lingua, commonly known as the long tongue sole or textile tongue sole is a species of fish found along the coast of the Philippines, Thailand, the Malay Peninsula, Myanmar, the Bay of Bengal and as far west as the Red Sea.
