= Cynoglossus semilaevis =

Scientific classification
- Kingdom: Animalia
- Phylum: Chordata
- Class: Actinopterygii
- Division: Teleostei
- Order: Carangiformes
- Suborder: Pleuronectoidei
- Family: Cynoglossidae
- Genus: Cynoglossus
- Species: C. semilaevis

Binomial name
- Cynoglossus semilaevis Günther, 1873

Synonyms
- Areliscus semilaevis (Günther, 1873); Trulla semilaevis (Günther, 1873); Arelia rhomaleus (Jordan & Starks, 1906); Areliscus rhomaleus Jordan & Starks, 1906

Flatfish species

Cynoglossus semilaevis, commonly known as the Chinese tongue sole, is a popular aquaculture flatfish species. They are native to China's northern coast but have experienced overfishing these past three decades. Tongue sole farming began in 2003, and they have since become a popular, expensive seafood. Farmers in this practice encounter issues related to the tongue sole's pathogen susceptibility and uneven sex ratio.

== Sex determination ==
=== Sex & sex reversal ===
Cynoglossus semilaevis has a female heterogametic sex-determination system, with females being ZW and males being ZZ. Female tongue soles grow up to 2-4 times larger and faster than males, making them more desirable for aquaculture. To maximize yields, efforts have been made to produce all-female stocks through artificial gynogenesis. However, the sex ratio of C. semilaevis populations in both the wild and aquaculture environments is male-skewed due to the occurrence of pseudomales or individuals with female ZW chromosomes that become physiologically male. Offspring of pseudomales tend to grow more slowly than those of genetic males and are more likely to become pseudomales themselves, further skewing the sex ratio. This phenomenon is influenced by a combination of genotypic sex determination and temperature-dependent sex determination. Higher temperatures during the gonadal sex differentiation stage (approximately 56–62 days post-hatching) significantly increase the likelihood of sex reversal. For example, one study found that the likelihood of females becoming pseudomales increased to 73% when reared at a higher temperature (28 °C) as opposed to a 14% sex-reversal rate when reared at an ambient temperature (22 °C). Furthermore, the offspring of the pseudomales reared at 28 °C had a sex-reversal rate of 94% despite being reared at 22 °C. This high rate of females becoming pseudomales in the F2 generation was attributed to the offspring inheriting their Z chromosome from their pseudomale father and retaining paternal methylation patterns.

=== Sex-specific molecular markers ===
A single SNP, Cyn_Z_6676874, allows certain females to become pseudomales. Females with a thymine at this site can undergo sex reversal, but females with an adenine cannot. There are also three known female-specific molecular markers that can be used to distinguish between the various tongue sole sexes. Two SNPs, SNP_chr_8935925_C_T and SNP_chr_8936186_C_G, and one indel were found to enable accurate differentiation between males, females, and pseudomales.

=== Gene expression in the gonads ===
Gene expression in the gonads of males and females are different before sex determination, after sex determination, and after exposure to higher temperatures. Prior to sex determination, males and females have differentially expressed genes (DEGs) related to muscle development. Following sex determination, females have upregulated female-specific genes, figla and foxl2, and downregulation of the male-specific genes, dmrt1 and amh, under both ambient and high-temperature conditions. When exposed to higher temperatures, males, females, and pseudomales have hundreds of DEGs in common that are mainly involved in biological processes and molecular functions.

Pseudomale gonads have more similar gene expression patterns to males than females. DEGs between males and pseudomales played a role in spermatogenesis and energy metabolism. Whereas, DEGS between females and pseudomales were related to steroid hormones, helicase activity, sexual differentiation, and development.
