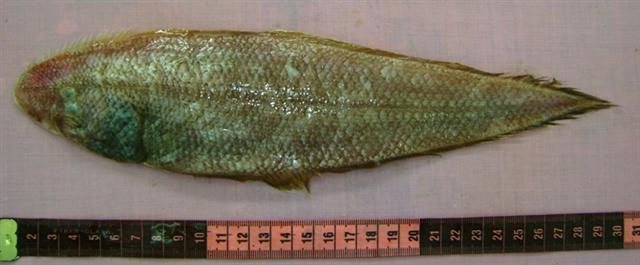
- Picture of Cynoglossus arel next to a ruler

Scientific classification
- Kingdom: Animalia
- Phylum: Chordata
- Class: Actinopterygii
- Order: Carangiformes
- Suborder: Pleuronectoidei
- Family: Cynoglossidae
- Genus: Cynoglossus
- Species: C. arel

Binomial name
- Cynoglossus arel (Bloch & Schneider, 1801)

Synonyms
- Pleuronectes arel

= Cynoglossus arel =

Species of fish

Cynoglossus arel, commonly known as the largescale tonguesole, is a species of tonguefish. The eyed side of the fish is uniform brown, with a dark patch on the gill cover, and its blind side is white. They are harmless to humans and predominantly feed on bottom-living invertebrates.

== Distribution ==
It is commonly found in muddy and sandy bottoms of the Indo-West Pacific and Indian Ocean, from the Persian Gulf to Sri Lanka and Indonesia, and as far north as the south coast of Japan, down to depths of 125 metres.

== Description ==
They have no dorsal spines, 116-130 dorsal soft rays, no anal spines, 85-98 anal soft rays, and 50-57 vertebrae. The average size of this species is 30 cm (12 in) and the max length is 40 cm (16 in).
