= Cynoglossus browni =

Conservation status
- Data Deficient (IUCN 3.1)

Scientific classification
- Kingdom: Animalia
- Phylum: Chordata
- Class: Actinopterygii
- Order: Carangiformes
- Suborder: Pleuronectoidei
- Family: Cynoglossidae
- Genus: Cynoglossus
- Species: C. browni

Binomial name
- Cynoglossus browni Chabanaud, 1949

Species of fish

Cynoglossus browni, commonly known as the Nigerian tonguesole, is a species of tonguefish. It is found in the eastern Atlantic Ocean off the coast of west Africa, from Senegal to Angola. It inhabits soft substrates such as mud or sand between depths of 15m and 40 m. Its main food is small benthic invertebrates.
