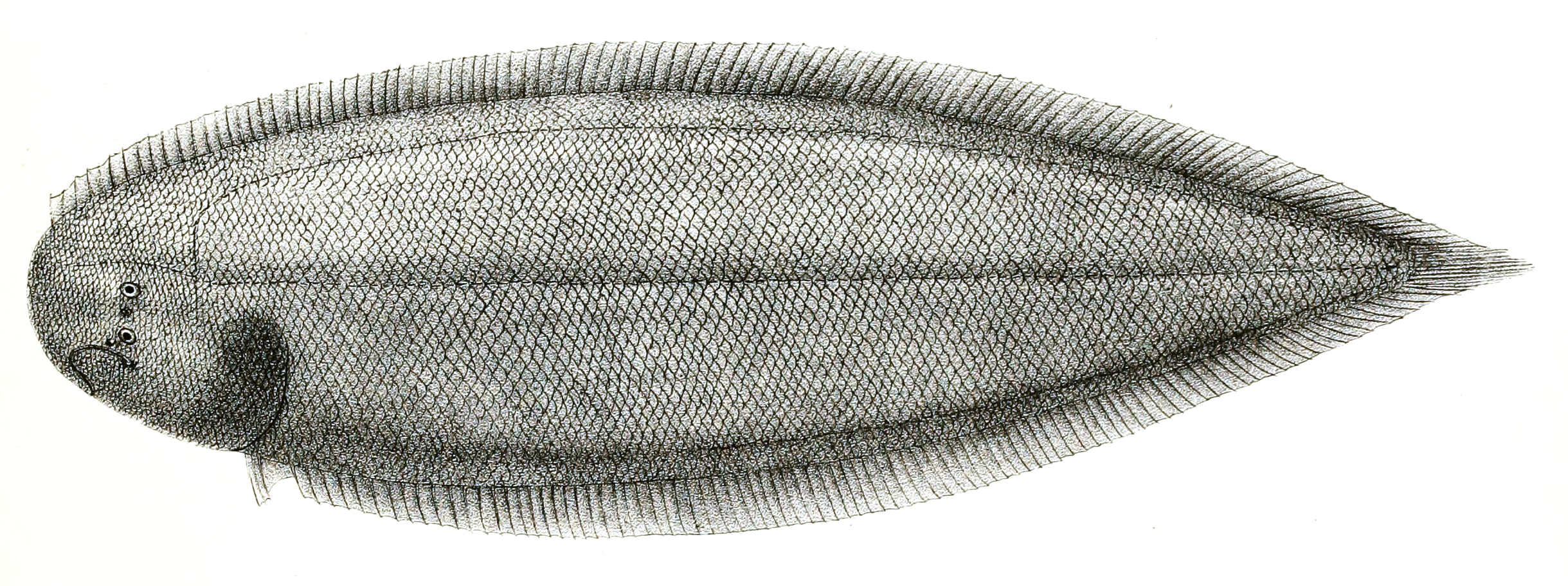

Scientific classification
- Domain: Eukaryota
- Kingdom: Animalia
- Phylum: Chordata
- Class: Actinopterygii
- Order: Carangiformes
- Suborder: Pleuronectoidei
- Family: Cynoglossidae
- Genus: Cynoglossus
- Species: C. quadrilineatus

Binomial name
- Cynoglossus quadrilineatus (Bleeker, 1851)

= Cynoglossus quadrilineatus =

Species of fish

Cynoglossus quadrilineatus, the fourlined tonguesole, is a species of tonguefish native to the Indian Ocean from Pakistan to the western Pacific Ocean where it occurs from Japan to northern Australia. It can be found in marine and brackish waters (entering fresh waters in the tidal zone of the Mekong River) in estuaries and coastal waters out to the continental shelf at depths of from 10 to 400 metres (33 to 1,312 ft). This species can reach a length of 44 centimetres (17 in) SL though most do not exceed 30 centimetres (12 in) SL. It is important in local commercial fisheries.

== Taxonomic revision ==
This species was previously known as C. bilineatus (Lacépède, 1802), however research by Maurice Kottelat has determined that Lacépède's description of Achirus bilineatus (later moved to genus Cynoglossus) was taken from materials that derived directly from Bloch's description of Pleuronectes bilineatus and thus renders Lacépède's A. bilineatus and thus C. bilineatus as junior synonyms of Bloch's Pl. bilineatus (now Paraplagusia bilineatus). Thus the earliest available name for this particular species becomes Bleeker's Plagusia quadrilineata.
