= Cynoglossus sinusarabici =

Scientific classification
- Domain: Eukaryota
- Kingdom: Animalia
- Phylum: Chordata
- Class: Actinopterygii
- Order: Carangiformes
- Suborder: Pleuronectoidei
- Family: Cynoglossidae
- Genus: Cynoglossus
- Species: C. sinusarabici

Binomial name
- Cynoglossus sinusarabici (Chabanaud, 1931)

Synonyms
- Dollfusichthys sinusarabici Chabanaud, 1931

Species of fish

Cynoglossus sinusarabici, the Red Sea tonguesole, is a species of tonguefish which occurs in the Red Sea and is now common in the eastern Mediterranean Sea following its migration through the Suez Canal. It was first recorded in the Mediterranean Sea off Israel in 1953 and successively observed in Turkey and Egypt. It has an elongated body with a rounded snout which has a rostral hook large, narrowly separated eyes. It has 99–101 dorsal fin rays, 78–79 rays in its anal fin and 8 rays in the caudal fin. The lateral line has 54–60 scales with 11 scales between the lateral line and the base of the dorsal fin. The lateral line is only present on the eyed side. It is uniform brown on the eyed side and whitish on the blind side. It grows to about 15 cm standard length.
