= Symphurus plagiusa =

Conservation status
- Least Concern (IUCN 3.1)

Scientific classification
- Kingdom: Animalia
- Phylum: Chordata
- Class: Actinopterygii
- Division: Teleostei
- Order: Carangiformes
- Suborder: Pleuronectoidei
- Family: Cynoglossidae
- Genus: Symphurus
- Species: S. plagiusa

Binomial name
- Symphurus plagiusa (Linnaeus, 1766)

Species of fish

Symphurus palgiusa, the blackcheek tonguefish, is a species of ray-finned fish in the tonguefish famliy, Cynoglossidae.

== Description ==
The blackcheek tonguefish has an elongated, compressed body that tapers off at the tail and is rounded at the head. It can reach up to 23 cm (9 in) long. Both eyes are on the left side of the fish, with the lower eye being smaller than the one above it. The cover over the pupil is either weak or not present. The mouth is relatively small and arched, especially on the fish's right side. The lower jaw on the left side has a fleshy crest. The upper jaw on the left side often lacks teeth. The dorsal fin has 81 to 91 rays, while the anal fin has 66 to 75 rays. The fish lacks pectoral fins.

The top side of the blackcheek tonguefish is brown with a varying number of darker crossbars. Typically, the fish has a black spot on the top part of the operculum on the top side. This spot is what gives the blackcheek tonguefish its common name. The underside of the fish is paler color, often yellow, with darker splotches.

== Distribution and habitat ==
The geographic range for the blackcheek tonguefish goes from Connecticut in the United States to the Bahamas, including throughout the Gulf of Mexico. Within this range, the fish lives in estuaries and coastal waters to depths down to 183 m but preferring only down to 30 m. The fish only lives in areas with soft sediments of sand, gravel, or mud.

== Ecology ==
The blackcheek tonguefish is a bottom-dwelling fish, similar to other species of flatfish. Along the substrate, the fish eats small, epibenthic plankton, primarily copepods but also other small arthropods, polychaetas, and bivalves.

== Relation to humans ==
While the blackcheek tonguefish is not a commercially harvested species, it is commonly caught as bycatch while bottom trawling. They are often thought of as a nuisance as they can clog the nets, particularly in the shrimping industry.
