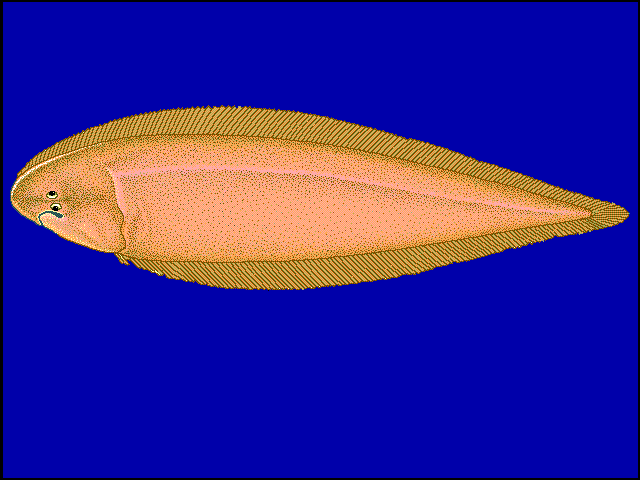

Conservation status
- Near Threatened (IUCN 3.1)

Scientific classification
- Kingdom: Animalia
- Phylum: Chordata
- Class: Actinopterygii
- Order: Carangiformes
- Suborder: Pleuronectoidei
- Family: Cynoglossidae
- Genus: Cynoglossus
- Species: C. canariensis

Binomial name
- Cynoglossus canariensis Steindachner, 1882

= Cynoglossus canariensis =

Species of fish

Cynoglossus canariensis, commonly known as the Canary tonguesole is a species of tonguefish. It is commonly found in the eastern Atlantic Ocean off western Africa, from Mauritania and Western Sahara south to Angola, including the Canary Islands and Cape Verde Islands. It is a demersal species found at depths of 10-300m, it has been found in brackish water, but is normally a coastal species which occurs over substrates of sand or mud. It feeds on small fish and crustaceans. This species is targeted in trawl fisheries throughout its range and in many areas, it appears to have undergone significant declines. For example, in Gabon the mixed Cynoglossus stock is considered overexploited, while in other parts of western Africa such as Mauritania the stocks of Cynoglossus had declined by over 60% in the five or six years up to 2015. The IUCN list C. canariensis as Near Threatened due to is dependence on conservation.
