= Cynoglossus attenuatus =

Scientific classification
- Kingdom: Animalia
- Phylum: Chordata
- Class: Actinopterygii
- Order: Carangiformes
- Suborder: Pleuronectoidei
- Family: Cynoglossidae
- Genus: Cynoglossus
- Species: C. attenuatus

Binomial name
- Cynoglossus attenuatus Gilchrist, 1904

Synonyms
- Arelia attenuata (Gilchrist, 1904)

Species of fish

Cynoglossus attenuatus, commonly known as the Fourline tonguesole, is a species of tonguefish. It is commonly found in the western Indian Ocean off the eastern coast of Africa, from Delagoa Bay, Mozambique to Durban in South Africa.
