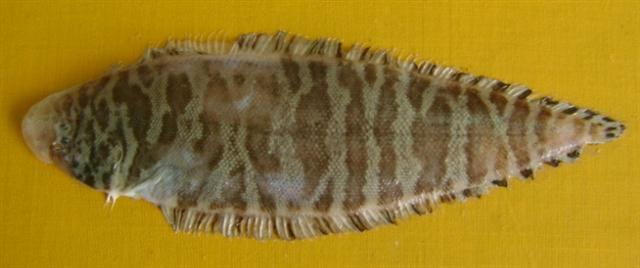

Scientific classification
- Kingdom: Animalia
- Phylum: Chordata
- Class: Actinopterygii
- Order: Carangiformes
- Suborder: Pleuronectoidei
- Family: Cynoglossidae
- Genus: Cynoglossus
- Species: C. puncticeps

Binomial name
- Cynoglossus puncticeps (J. Richardson, 1846)

Synonyms
- Plagusia puncticeps Richardson, 1846; Plagiusa aurolimbata Richardson, 1846; Plagiusa nigrolabeculata Richardson, 1846; Cynoglossus nigrolabeculatus (Richardson, 1846); Plagusia brachyrhynchos Bleeker, 1851; Arelia brachyrhynchos (Bleeker, 1851); Cynoglossus brachyrhynchus (Bleeker, 1851); Plagusia javanica Bleeker, 1851; Arelia javanica (Bleeker, 1851); Cynoglossus brevis Günther, 1862

= Cynoglossus puncticeps =

Species of fish

Cynoglossus puncticeps, commonly known as the speckled tonguesole is a species of tonguefish. It is indigenous to the Indo-West Pacific region, commonly found in shallow muddy or sandy waters along the coast of the Philippines, Thailand, the Malay Peninsula, Burma, the Bay of Bengal and off Papua New Guinea and northern Australia.
