= Euryglossa =

Euryglossa may refer to:

- Euryglossa (bee), a genus of bee in the family Colletidae
- Euryglossa, a genus of fishes in the family Soleidae, synonym of Brachirus
- Euryglossa Motschoulsky, [1860], a genus of beetles in the family Staphylinidae, synonym of Leucocraspedum
- Euryglossa Fauvel, 1866, a genus of beetles in the family Staphylinidae, synonym of Pagla
