= Cynoglossus cadenati =

Conservation status
- Data Deficient (IUCN 3.1)

Scientific classification
- Kingdom: Animalia
- Phylum: Chordata
- Class: Actinopterygii
- Order: Carangiformes
- Suborder: Pleuronectoidei
- Family: Cynoglossidae
- Genus: Cynoglossus
- Species: C. cadenati

Binomial name
- Cynoglossus cadenati Chabanaud, 1947

Species of fish

Cynoglossus cadenati, commonly known as the Ghanaian tonguesole is a species of tonguefish. It is commonly found in the eastern Atlantic Ocean off the coast of west Africa from Mauritania to Angola, including the Cape Verde Islands. It is found on sand and mud bottoms of coastal waters.
