= Cynoglossus acaudatus =

Scientific classification
- Kingdom: Animalia
- Phylum: Chordata
- Class: Actinopterygii
- Order: Carangiformes
- Suborder: Pleuronectoidei
- Family: Cynoglossidae
- Genus: Cynoglossus
- Species: C. acaudatus

Binomial name
- Cynoglossus acaudatus Gilchrist, 1906

Synonyms
- Areliscus natalensis von Bonde, 1922; Cynoglossus hunteri von Bonde, 1925

Species of fish

Cynoglossus acaudatus, commonly known as the Natal tongue fish is a species of tonguefish. It is commonly found in shallow muddy or sandy waters along the coast of the Western Indian Ocean, Somalia down to South Africa, including Seychelles.
