= Cynoglossus carpenteri =

Scientific classification
- Kingdom: Animalia
- Phylum: Chordata
- Class: Actinopterygii
- Order: Carangiformes
- Suborder: Pleuronectoidei
- Family: Cynoglossidae
- Genus: Cynoglossus
- Species: C. carpenteri

Binomial name
- Cynoglossus carpenteri Alcock, 1889

Species of fish

Cynoglossus carpenteri, commonly known as the Hooked tonguesole is a species of tonguefish. It is commonly found in the Indian Ocean.
