= Cynoglossus durbanensis =

Scientific classification
- Domain: Eukaryota
- Kingdom: Animalia
- Phylum: Chordata
- Class: Actinopterygii
- Order: Carangiformes
- Suborder: Pleuronectoidei
- Family: Cynoglossidae
- Genus: Cynoglossus
- Species: C. durbanensis

Binomial name
- Cynoglossus durbanensis Regan, 1921

Species of fish

Cynoglossus durbanensis, commonly known as the Durban tonguesole is a species of tonguefish. It is commonly found in the western Indian Ocean off the coast of Kenya, Madagascar, Mozambique and South Africa.
