= Cynoglossus broadhursti =

Scientific classification
- Kingdom: Animalia
- Phylum: Chordata
- Class: Actinopterygii
- Order: Carangiformes
- Suborder: Pleuronectoidei
- Family: Cynoglossidae
- Genus: Cynoglossus
- Species: C. broadhursti

Binomial name
- Cynoglossus broadhursti Waite, 1905

Species of fish

Cynoglossus broadhursti, commonly known as the Southern tonguesole is a species of tonguefish. It is commonly found in the Indian Ocean off western and southern Australia.
