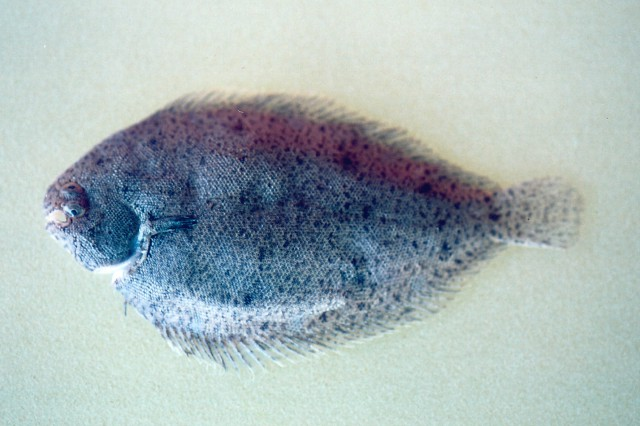

Conservation status
- Least Concern (IUCN 3.1)

Scientific classification
- Kingdom: Animalia
- Phylum: Chordata
- Class: Actinopterygii
- Order: Carangiformes
- Suborder: Pleuronectoidei
- Family: Soleidae
- Genus: Brachirus
- Species: B. harmandi

Binomial name
- Brachirus harmandi (Sauvage, 1878)

Synonyms
- Euryglossa harmandi (Sauvage, 1878); Synaptura harmandi Sauvage, 1878; Brachirus aenea (Smith, 1931); Synaptura aenea Smith, 1931

= Harmand's sole =

Species of fish

Harmand's sole (Brachirus harmandi) is a species of true sole.

== Description ==
It resembles B. panoides from the same genus, but has a drop-shaped body. The eyes are close together, the mouth is small and slightly crooked. The fins are almost completely connected along the body, with very small pectoral fins. The upper body is dark brown with dark spots scattered throughout, including along the fins. The fins have pale edges with dark speckles. The underside is white, and the scales are rough. The body length is about 10 cm (4 in). Its behavior is similar to B. panoides. It is found in the same habitats but also occurs in the northeastern of Thailand, and the Mekong basin, as well as in Cambodia, the Malay Peninsula, and has been reported in the South China Sea area.

== Human uses ==
Harmand's sole is used for consumption, both fresh and dried, commanding a relatively high market price. It is also collected from the wild for the ornamental fish trade.
