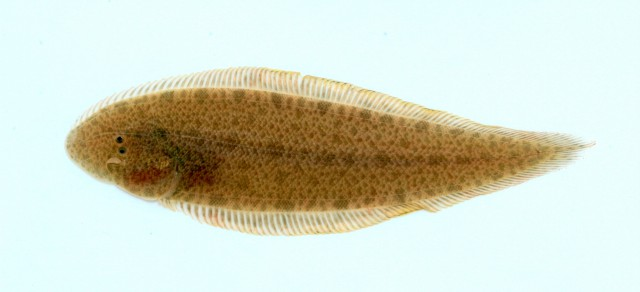

Conservation status
- Least Concern (IUCN 3.1)

Scientific classification
- Kingdom: Animalia
- Phylum: Chordata
- Class: Actinopterygii
- Order: Carangiformes
- Suborder: Pleuronectoidei
- Family: Cynoglossidae
- Genus: Cynoglossus
- Species: C. feldmanni

Binomial name
- Cynoglossus feldmanni (Bleeker, 1853)

Synonyms
- Plagusia feldmanni Bleeker, 1854; Arelia feldmanni (Bleeker, 1854); Cynoglossus hardenbergi Norman, 1931; Cynoglossus aubentoni Stauch, 1966

= Cynoglossus feldmanni =

Species of fish

Cynoglossus feldmanni, commonly known as the River tonguesole is a species of tonguefish occurring in freshwater. It is commonly found in Thailand, Laos, Borneo, Sumatra and Cambodia. It occurs in rivers in freshwater well above the tidal zone where it lives on the bottom feeding on benthic invertebrates.
