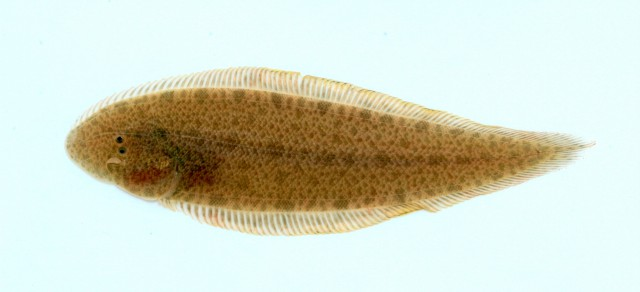
- Cynoglossus feldmanni
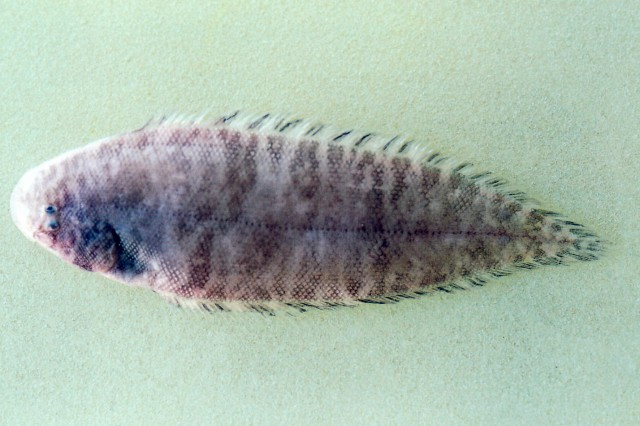
- Cynoglossus monopus

Scientific classification
- Kingdom: Animalia
- Phylum: Chordata
- Class: Actinopterygii
- Division: Teleostei
- Order: Carangiformes
- Suborder: Pleuronectoidei
- Family: Cynoglossidae
- Genus: Cynoglossus; Hamilton, 1822

Type species
- Cynoglossus lingua Hamilton, 1822

Synonyms
- Arelia Kaup, 1858; Areliscus Jordan & Snyder, 1900; Cantoria Kaup, 1858; Cantorusia Whitley, 1940; Cynoglossoides von Bonde, 1922; Dexiourius Chabanaud, 1947; Dollfusichthys Chabanaud, 1931; Icania Kaup, 1858; Notrullus Whitley, 1951; Trulla Kaup, 1858

= Cynoglossus =

Genus of fishes

Cynoglossus is a genus of fish in the family Cynoglossidae. Most species are indigenous to the Indo-Pacific region, but there are also a few in warmer parts of the East Atlantic. They are commonly found in shallow waters on a muddy or sandy bottom, including estuaries and a few species are restricted to fresh water. One species Cynoglossus sinusarabici has invaded the Mediterranean Sea through the Suez Canal from the Red Sea, a process known as Lessepsian or Erythrean migration.

== Species ==
There are currently 67 recognized species in this genus:

- Cynoglossus abbreviatus (J. E. Gray, 1834) (Three-lined tongue sole)
- Cynoglossus acaudatus Gilchrist, 1906 (Natal tongue sole)
- Cynoglossus acutirostris Norman, 1939 (Sharp-nose tongue sole)
- Cynoglossus arel (Bloch & J. G. Schneider, 1801) (Large-scale tongue sole)
- Cynoglossus attenuatus Gilchrist, 1904
- Cynoglossus brachycephalus Bleeker, 1870
- Cynoglossus broadhursti Waite, 1905 (Southern tongue sole)
- Cynoglossus browni Chabanaud, 1949 (Nigerian tongue sole)
- Cynoglossus cadenati Chabanaud, 1947 (Ghanaian tongue sole)
- Cynoglossus canariensis Steindachner, 1882 (Canary tongue sole)
- Cynoglossus capensis (Kaup, 1858) (Sand tongue sole)
- Cynoglossus carpenteri Alcock, 1889 (Hooked tongue sole)
- Cynoglossus crepida Fricke, Golani & Appelbaum-Golani, 2017, (Bluntnose deepwater tongue sole)
- Cynoglossus cynoglossus (F. Hamilton, 1822) (Bengal tongue sole)
- Cynoglossus dispar F. Day, 1877 (Round-head tongue sole)
- Cynoglossus dollfusi (Chabanaud, 1931)
- Cynoglossus dubius F. Day, 1873 (Carrot tongue sole)
- Cynoglossus durbanensis Regan, 1921 (Durban tongue sole)
- Cynoglossus feldmanni (Bleeker, 1854) (River tongue sole)
- Cynoglossus gilchristi Regan, 1920 (Ripple-fin tongue sole)
- Cynoglossus gracilis Günther, 1873
- Cynoglossus heterolepis M. C. W. Weber, 1910 (Freshwater tongue sole)
- Cynoglossus interruptus Günther, 1880 (Genko tongue sole)
- Cynoglossus itinus (Snyder, 1909)
- Cynoglossus joyneri Günther, 1878 (Red tongue sole)
- Cynoglossus kapuasensis Fowler, 1905
- Cynoglossus kopsii (Bleeker, 1851) (Short-headed tongue sole)
- Cynoglossus lachneri Menon, 1977 (Lachner's tongue sole)
- Cynoglossus lida (Bleeker, 1851) (Rough-scale tongue sole)
- Cynoglossus lighti Norman, 1925
- Cynoglossus lineolatus Steindachner, 1867
- Cynoglossus lingua F. Hamilton, 1822 (Long tongue sole)
- Cynoglossus maccullochi Norman, 1926
- Cynoglossus macrolepidotus (Bleeker, 1851)
- Cynoglossus macrophthalmus Norman, 1926 (Big-eyed tongue sole)
- Cynoglossus macrostomus Norman, 1928 (Malabar tongue sole)

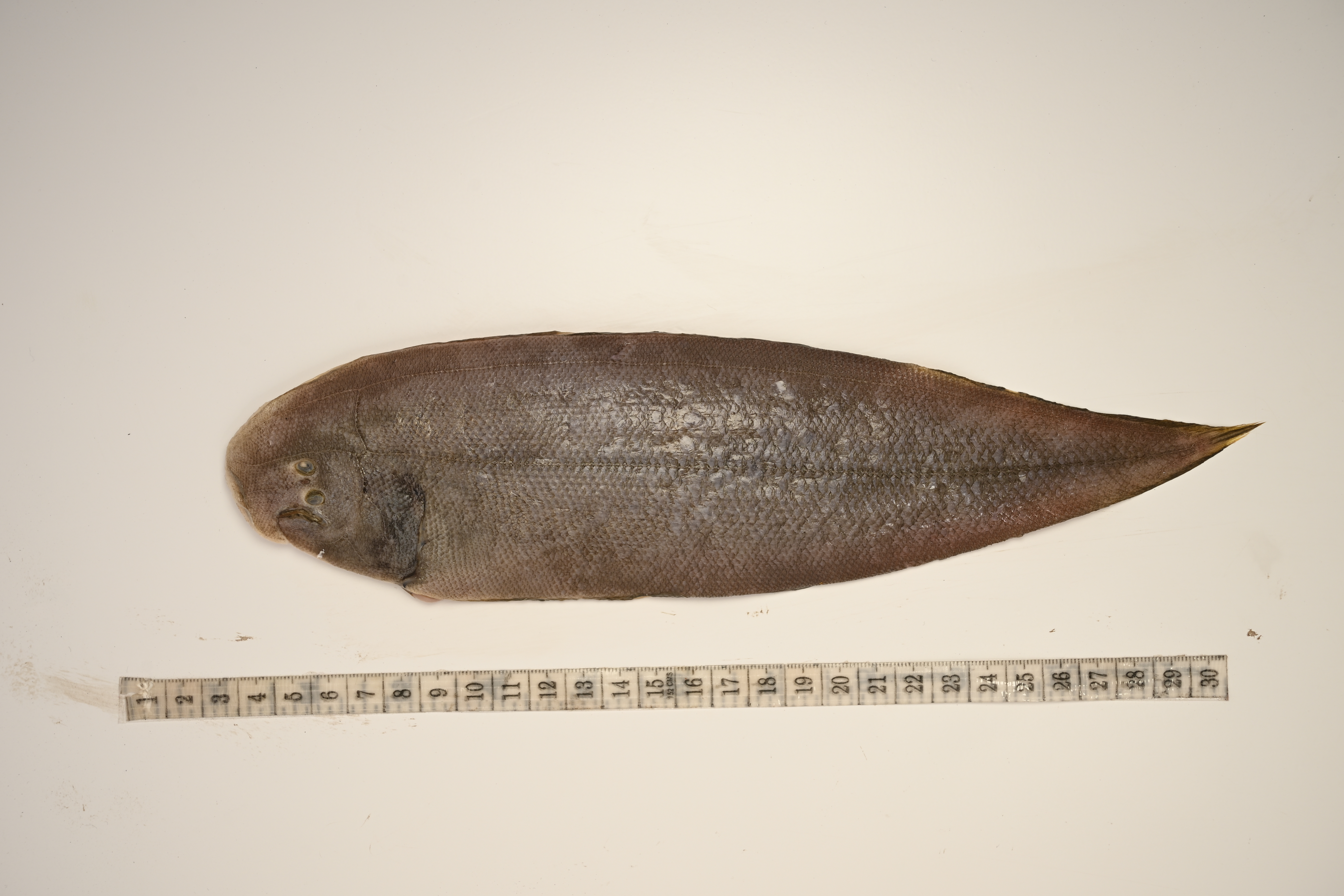
Cynoglossus macrostomus

- Cynoglossus maculipinnis Rendahl (de), 1921
- Cynoglossus marleyi Regan, 1921
- Cynoglossus melampetalus (J. Richardson, 1846)
- Cynoglossus microlepis (Bleeker, 1851) (Small-scale tongue sole)
- Cynoglossus monodi Chabanaud, 1949 (Guinean tongue sole)
- Cynoglossus monopus (Bleeker, 1849)
- Cynoglossus nanhaiensis Z. M. Wang, Munroe & X. Y. Kong, 2016 (Nanhai tongue sole)
- Cynoglossus nigropinnatus Ochiai, 1963
- Cynoglossus ochiaii Yokogawa, Endo & Sakaji, 2008
- Cynoglossus ogilbyi Norman, 1926
- Cynoglossus oligolepis (Bleeker, 1855)
- Cynoglossus pottii Steindachner, 1902
- Cynoglossus praecisus Alcock, 1890
- Cynoglossus puncticeps (J. Richardson, 1846) (Speckled tongue sole)
- Cynoglossus purpureomaculatus Regan, 1905
- Cynoglossus quadrilineatus (Bleeker, 1851) (Four-lined tongue sole)
- Cynoglossus quadriocellatus R. Fricke, 2020
- Cynoglossus robustus Günther, 1873
- Cynoglossus roulei H. W. Wu, 1932
- Cynoglossus sealarki Regan, 1908
- Cynoglossus semifasciatus F. Day, 1877 (Bengal tongue sole)
- Cynoglossus semilaevis Günther, 1873 (Tongue sole)
- Cynoglossus senegalensis (Kaup, 1858) (Senegalese tongue sole)
- Cynoglossus sibogae M. C. W. Weber, 1913
- Cynoglossus sinicus H. W. Wu, 1932
- Cynoglossus sinusarabici (Chabanaud, 1931) (Red Sea tongue sole)
- Cynoglossus suyeni Fowler, 1934
- Cynoglossus trigrammus Günther, 1862
- Cynoglossus trulla (Cantor, 1849) (Macau tongue sole)
- Cynoglossus versicolor Alcock, 1890
- Cynoglossus waandersii (Bleeker, 1854)
- Cynoglossus xiphoideus Günther, 1862
- Cynoglossus zanzibarensis Norman, 1939 (Zanzibar tongue sole)
