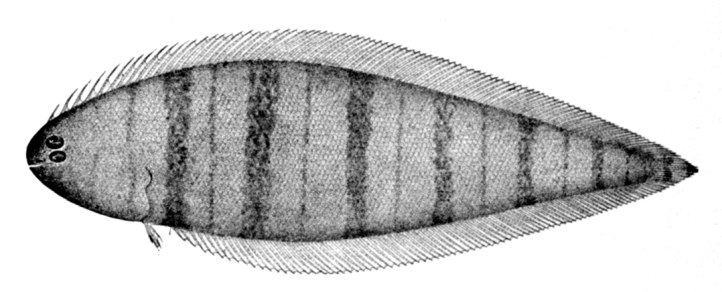

Conservation status
- Least Concern (IUCN 3.1)

Scientific classification
- Kingdom: Animalia
- Phylum: Chordata
- Class: Actinopterygii
- Order: Carangiformes
- Suborder: Pleuronectoidei
- Family: Cynoglossidae
- Genus: Symphurus
- Species: S. pusillus

Binomial name
- Symphurus pusillus Goode & Bean, 1885

= Symphurus pusillus =

Species of fish

The northern tonguefish (Symphurus pusillus) is a species of fish belonging to the family Cynoglossidae.

== Description ==
The body of the northern tonguefish has alternating narrow and broad bands spanning its length. It has 12 caudal fin rays. It has a slender body with a small, rounded, oblique mouth. Its eyes are small and very close together. It has scaled jaws and snout, and its scales are quite small. The dorsal fin begins immediately above the center of the species' eyes. It is light brown in color, and has 6 to 7 cross bars on its body of a slightly darker hue.

== Distribution and habitat ==
The northern tonguefish is found on muddy sea beds at moderate depths down to 233m 44 meters. It is found in the western North Atlantic from Cape Hatteras to the Gulf of Mexico.
