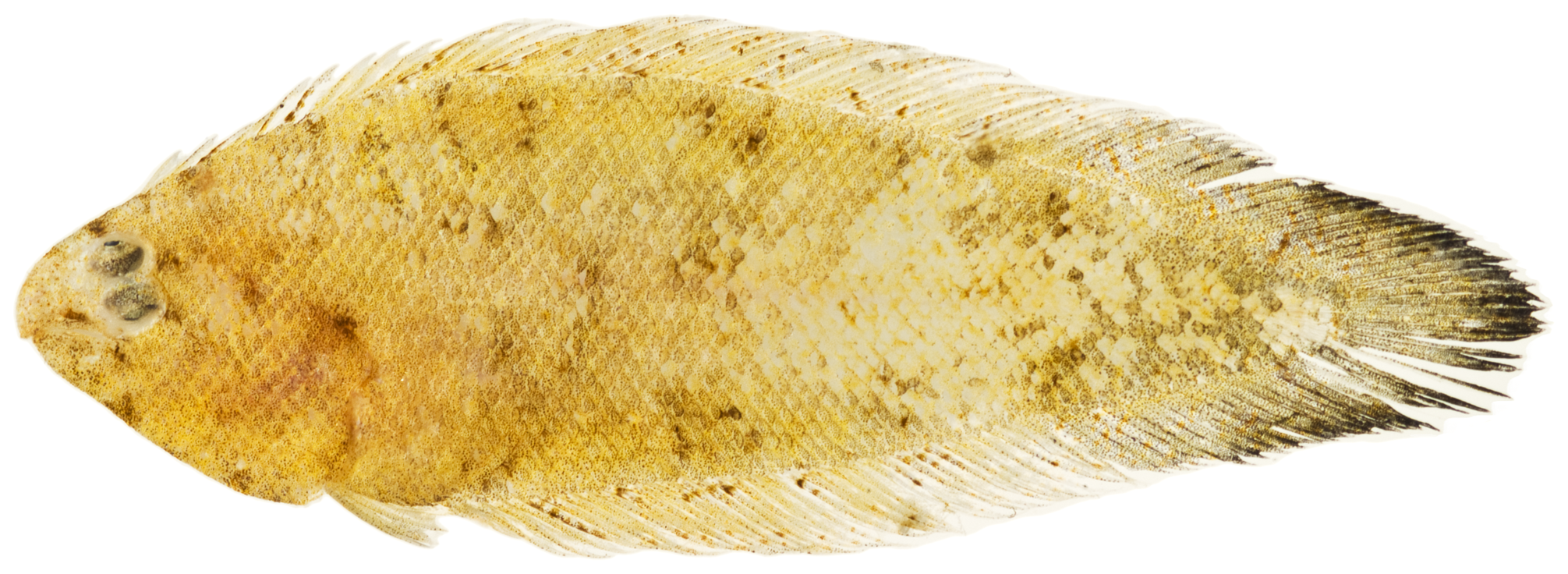
- Symphurus arawak
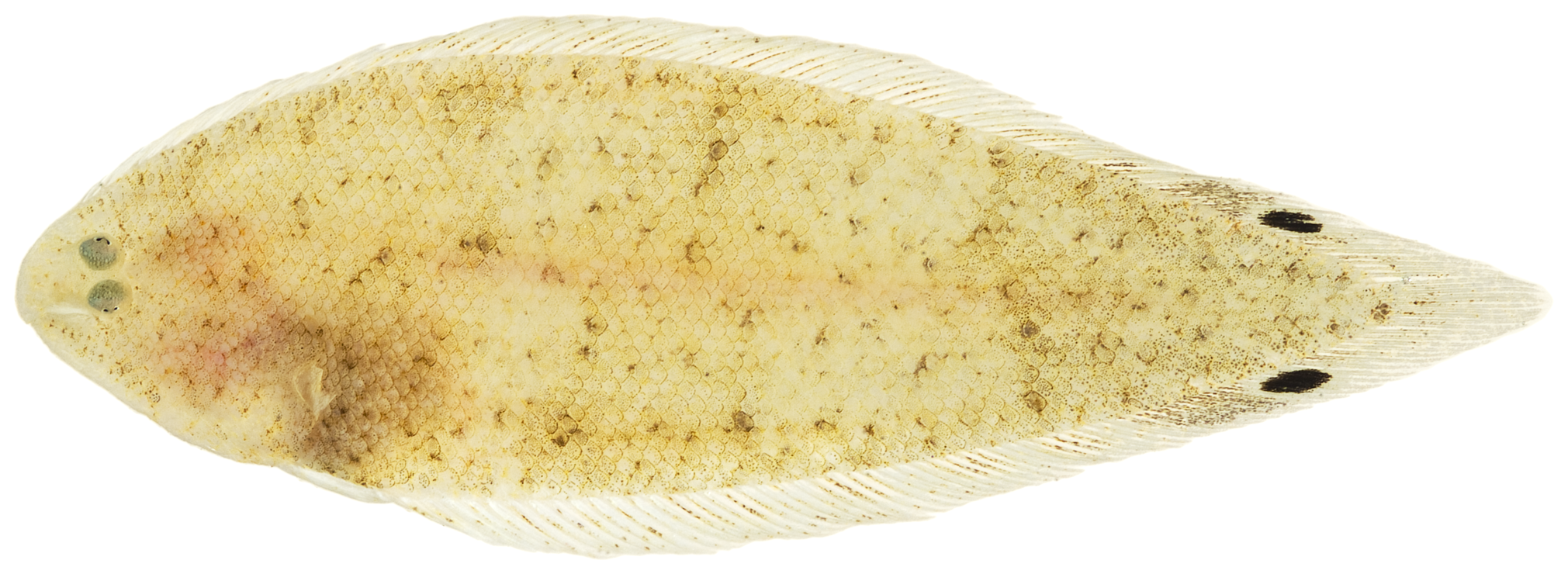
- Symphurus ommaspilus

Scientific classification
- Kingdom: Animalia
- Phylum: Chordata
- Class: Actinopterygii
- Order: Carangiformes
- Suborder: Pleuronectoidei
- Family: Cynoglossidae
- Subfamily: Symphurinae
- Genus: Symphurus; Rafinesque, 1810

Type species
- Symphurus nigrescens Rafinesque, 1810

Synonyms
- Ammopleurops Günther, 1862; Glossichthys Gill, 1861

= Symphurus =

Genus of fishes

Symphurus is a genus of fish in the family Cynoglossidae found in the Atlantic, Indian and Pacific Ocean. Most species mainly occur in relatively shallow water, including estuaries. Some species are also found in deeper water, including S. thermophilus that lives at hydrothermal vents (the only flatfish known from this habitat). These species are distinguished by merged dorsal, caudal and anal fins, the absence of a lateral line and pectoral fins, and the presence of only one pelvic fin. They are sinistral flatfishes, meaning that as adults, their crania are asymmetrical, with both eyes on the left side. The largest species grows to about 32 cm (1 ft) long.

== Species ==
There are currently 78 recognized species in this genus:

- Symphurus arawak C. R. Robins & J. E. Randall, 1965 (Caribbean tonguefish)
- Symphurus atramentatus D. S. Jordan & Bollman, 1890 (Ink-spot tonguefish)
- Symphurus atricauda (D. S. Jordan & C. H. Gilbert, 1880) (California tonguefish)
- Symphurus australis McCulloch, 1907
- Symphurus bathyspilus Krabbenhoft & Munroe, 2003
- Symphurus billykrietei Munroe, 1998 (Kriete's tonguefish)
- Symphurus callopterus Munroe & Mahadeva, 1989 (Chocolate tonguefish)
- Symphurus caribbeanus Munroe, 1991
- Symphurus chabanaudi Mahadeva & Munroe, 1990 (Chabanaud's tonguefish)
- Symphurus civitatium Ginsburg, 1951 (Offshore tonguefish)
- Symphurus diabolicus Mahadeva & Munroe, 1990 (Devil's tonguefish)
- Symphurus diomedeanus (Goode & T. H. Bean, 1885) (Spotted-fin tonguefish)
- Symphurus elongatus (Günther, 1868) (Elongated tonguefish)
- Symphurus fasciolaris C. H. Gilbert, 1892 (Banded tonguefish)
- Symphurus fuscus A. B. Brauer, 1906
- Symphurus gilesii (Alcock, 1889)
- Symphurus ginsburgi Menezes & Benvegnú, 1976 (Ginsburg's tonguefish)
- Symphurus gorgonae Chabanaud, 1948 (Gorgonian tonguefish)
- Symphurus holothuriae Chabanaud, 1948
- Symphurus hondoensis C. L. Hubbs, 1915
- Symphurus insularis Munroe, Brito & C. Hernández, 2000
- Symphurus jenynsi Evermann & Kendall, 1906 (Jenyn's tonguefish)
- Symphurus kyaropterygium Menezes & Benvegnú, 1976
- Symphurus leei D. S. Jordan & Bollman, 1890 (Lee's tonguefish)
- Symphurus leucochilus M. Y. Lee, Munroe & K. T. Shao, 2014
- Symphurus ligulatus (Cocco, 1844)
- Symphurus longirostris M. Y. Lee, Munroe & Y. Kai, 2016 (Long-snout tonguefish)
- Symphurus lubbocki Munroe, 1990
- Symphurus luzonensis Chabanaud, 1955
- Symphurus macrophthalmus Norman, 1939
- Symphurus maculopinnis Munroe, J. Tyler & Tunnicliffe, 2011
- Symphurus maldivensis Chabanaud, 1955
- Symphurus marginatus (Goode & T. H. Bean, 1886) (Margined tonguefish)
- Symphurus marmoratus Fowler, 1934
- Symphurus megasomus M. Y. Lee, H. M. Chen & K. T. Shao, 2009 (Giant tonguefish)
- Symphurus melanurus H. W. Clark, 1936 (Drab tonguefish)
- Symphurus melasmatotheca Munroe & Nizinski, 1990 (Black-stripe tonguefish)
- Symphurus microlepis Garman, 1899 (Small-fin tonguefish)
- Symphurus microrhynchus (M. C. W. Weber, 1913)
- Symphurus minor Ginsburg, 1951 (Large-scale tonguefish)
- Symphurus monostigmus Munroe, 2006
- Symphurus multimaculatus M. Y. Lee, Munroe & H. M. Chen, 2009 (Pepper-dot tonguefish)
- Symphurus nebulosus (Goode & T. H. Bean, 1883) (Freckled tonguefish)
- Symphurus nigrescens Rafinesque, 1810 (Tonguefish)
- Symphurus normani Chabanaud, 1950 (Norman's tonguefish)
- Symphurus novemfasciatus S. C. Shen & W. W. Lin, 1984
- Symphurus ocellaris Munroe & D. R. Robertson, 2005 (Ring-tail tonguefish)
- Symphurus ocellatus von Bonde, 1922 (Double-spot tonguefish)
- Symphurus oculellus Munroe, 1991
- Symphurus oligomerus Mahadeva & Munroe, 1990 (Spot-fin tonguefish)
- Symphurus ommaspilus J. E. Böhlke, 1961 (Ocellated tonguefish)
- Symphurus orientalis (Bleeker, 1879)
- Symphurus parvus Ginsburg, 1951 (Pygmy tonguefish)
- Symphurus pelicanus Ginsburg, 1951 (Long-tail tonguefish)
- Symphurus piger (Goode & T. H. Bean, 1886) (Deep-water tonguefish)
- Symphurus plagiusa (Linnaeus, 1766) (Black-cheek tonguefish)
- Symphurus plagusia (Bloch & J. G. Schneider, 1801) (Dusky-cheek tonguefish)
- Symphurus prolatinaris Munroe, Nizinski & Mahadeva, 1991 (Half-striped tonguefish)
- Symphurus pusillus (Goode & T. H. Bean, 1885) (Northern tonguefish)
- Symphurus regani M. C. W. Weber & de Beaufort, 1929
- Symphurus reticulatus Munroe, 1990
- Symphurus rhytisma J. E. Böhlke, 1961 (Patch-tail tonguefish)
- Symphurus schultzi Chabanaud, 1955
- Symphurus septemstriatus (Alcock, 1891) (Seven-band tonguefish)
- Symphurus stigmosus Munroe, 1998 (Blotch-fin tonguefish)
- Symphurus strictus C. H. Gilbert, 1905 (Black-belly tonguefish)
- Symphurus tessellatus (Quoy & Gaimard, 1824)
- Symphurus thermophilus Munroe & Hashimoto, 2008 (Western Pacific tonguefish)
- Symphurus trewavasae Chabanaud, 1948 (Trewavas' tonguefish)
- Symphurus trifasciatus (Alcock, 1894) (Three-band tonguefish)
- Symphurus undatus C. H. Gilbert, 1905
- Symphurus undecimplerus Munroe & Nizinski, 1990 (Dark-cheek tonguefish)
- Symphurus urospilus Ginsburg, 1951 (Spot-tail tonguefish)
- Symphurus vanmelleae Chabanaud, 1952 (Vanmelle's tonguefish)
- Symphurus variegatus (Gilchrist, 1903)
- Symphurus varius Garman, 1899 (Mottled tonguefish)
- Symphurus williamsi D. S. Jordan & Culver, 1895 (William's tonguefish)
- Symphurus woodmasoni (Alcock, 1889)
