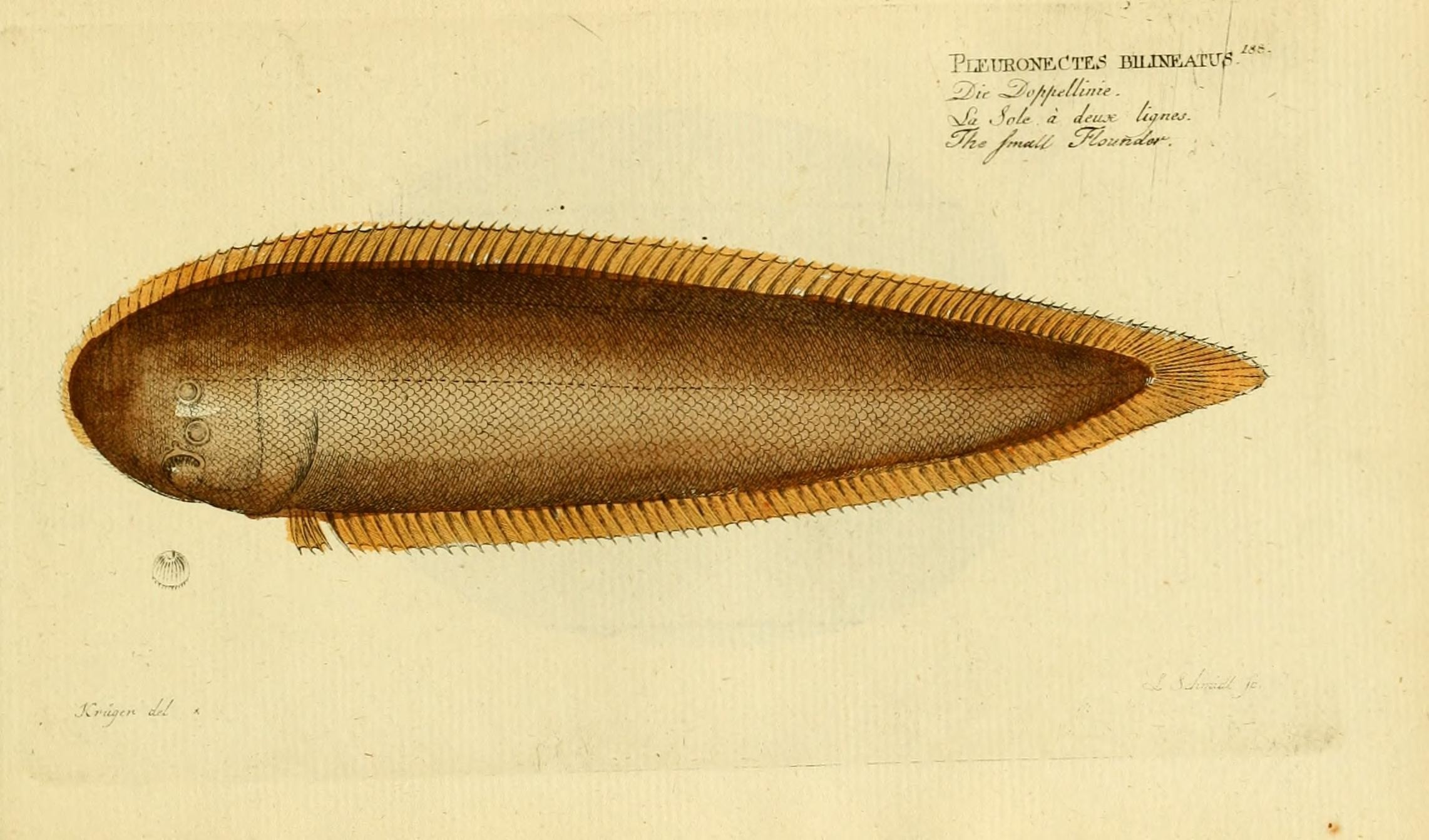
- Paraplagusia bilineata

Scientific classification
- Kingdom: Animalia
- Phylum: Chordata
- Class: Actinopterygii
- Order: Carangiformes
- Suborder: Pleuronectoidei
- Family: Cynoglossidae
- Subfamily: Cynoglossinae
- Genus: Paraplagusia; Bleeker, 1865

Type species
- Pleuronectes bilineatus Bloch, 1787

Synonyms
- Rhinoplagusia Bleeker, 1870; Usinostia D. S. Jordan & Snyder, 1900

= Paraplagusia =

Genus of fishes

Paraplagusia is a genus of tonguefish. It is indigenous to the Indo-Pacific region, where commonly found in shallow waters on a muddy or sandy bottom. The largest species reaches 35 cm (14 in) in length.

== Species ==
The currently recognized species in this genus are:

- Paraplagusia bilineata (Bloch, 1787) (doublelined tongue sole)
- Paraplagusia bleekeri Kottelat, 2013 (Bloch's tongue sole)
- Paraplagusia guttata (W. J. Macleay, 1878)
- Paraplagusia japonica (Temminck & Schlegel, 1846) (black cow-tongue)
- Paraplagusia longirostris Chapleau, Renaud & Kailola, 1991 (long-snouted tongue sole)
- Paraplagusia sinerama Chapleau & Renaud, 1993 (dusky tongue sole)
