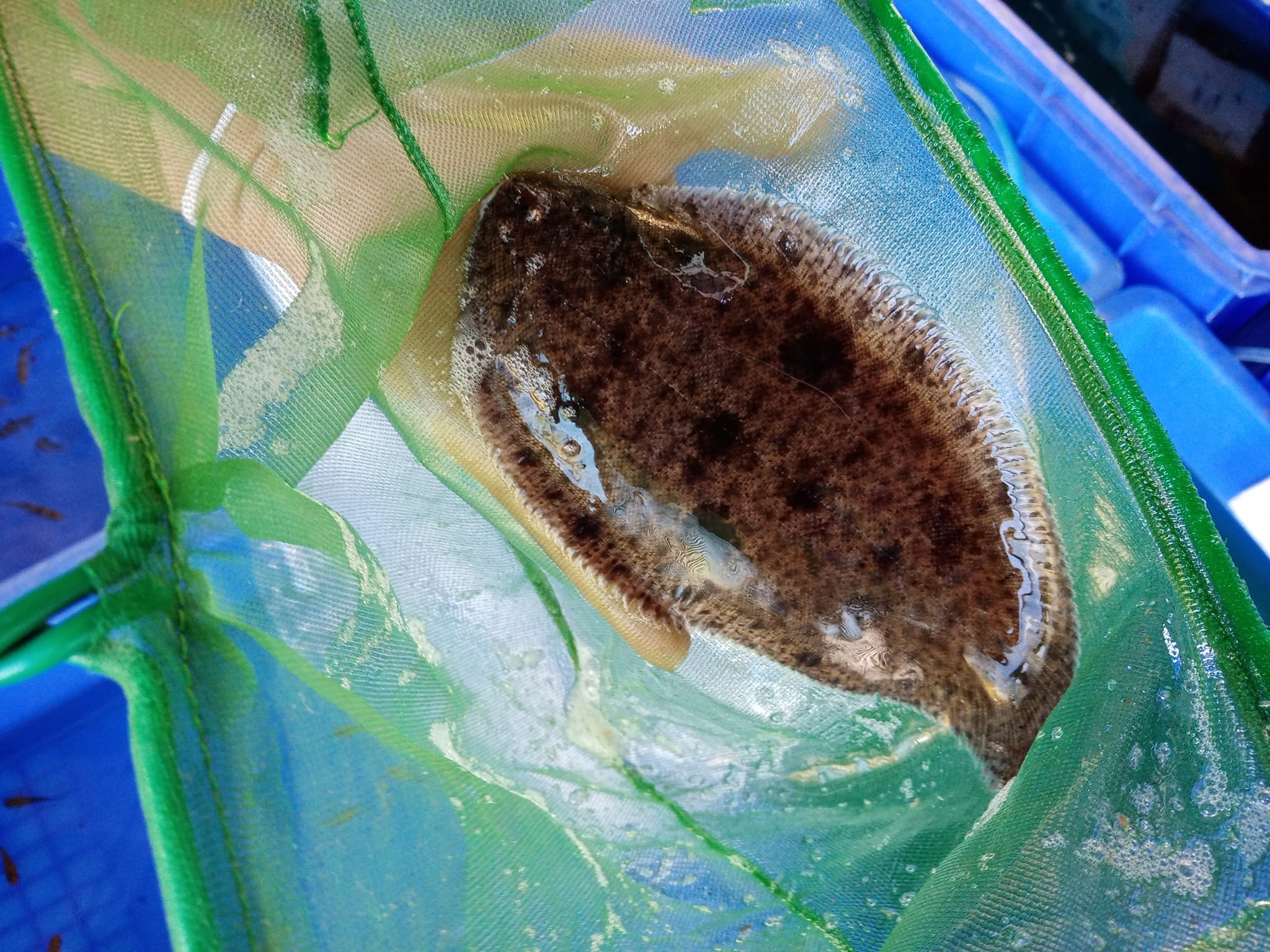
- Brachirus panoides

Scientific classification
- Kingdom: Animalia
- Phylum: Chordata
- Class: Actinopterygii
- Order: Carangiformes
- Suborder: Pleuronectoidei
- Family: Soleidae
- Genus: Brachirus; Swainson, 1839

Type species
- Pleuronectes orientalis Bloch & Schneider, 1801

= Brachirus =

Genus of fishes

Brachirus is a genus of small and medium-sized soles. Most are native to marine and brackish waters in the Indo-Pacific, but several species can also be seen freshwater in southern Asia, Eastern Africa, New Guinea and Australia.

== Species ==
There are currently 16 recognized species in this genus:

- Brachirus annularis Fowler, 1934 (Annular sole)
- Brachirus aspilos (Bleeker, 1852)
- Brachirus breviceps Ogilby, 1910 (Shorthead sole)
- Brachirus fitzroiensis (De Vis, 1882)
- Brachirus harmandi (Sauvage, 1878)
- Brachirus macrolepis (Bleeker, 1858)
- Brachirus niger (W. J. Macleay, 1880) (Black sole)
- Brachirus orientalis (Bloch & J. G. Schneider, 1801) (Oriental sole)
- Brachirus pan (F. Hamilton, 1822) (Pan sole)
- Brachirus panoides (Bleeker, 1851)
- Brachirus salinarum Ogilby, 1910
- Brachirus sayaensis Voronina, 2019
- Brachirus selheimi (W. J. Macleay, 1882) (Selheim's sole)
- Brachirus siamensis (Sauvage, 1878)
- Brachirus swinhonis (Steindachner, 1867)
- Brachirus villosus (M. C. W. Weber, 1907) (Velvety sole)

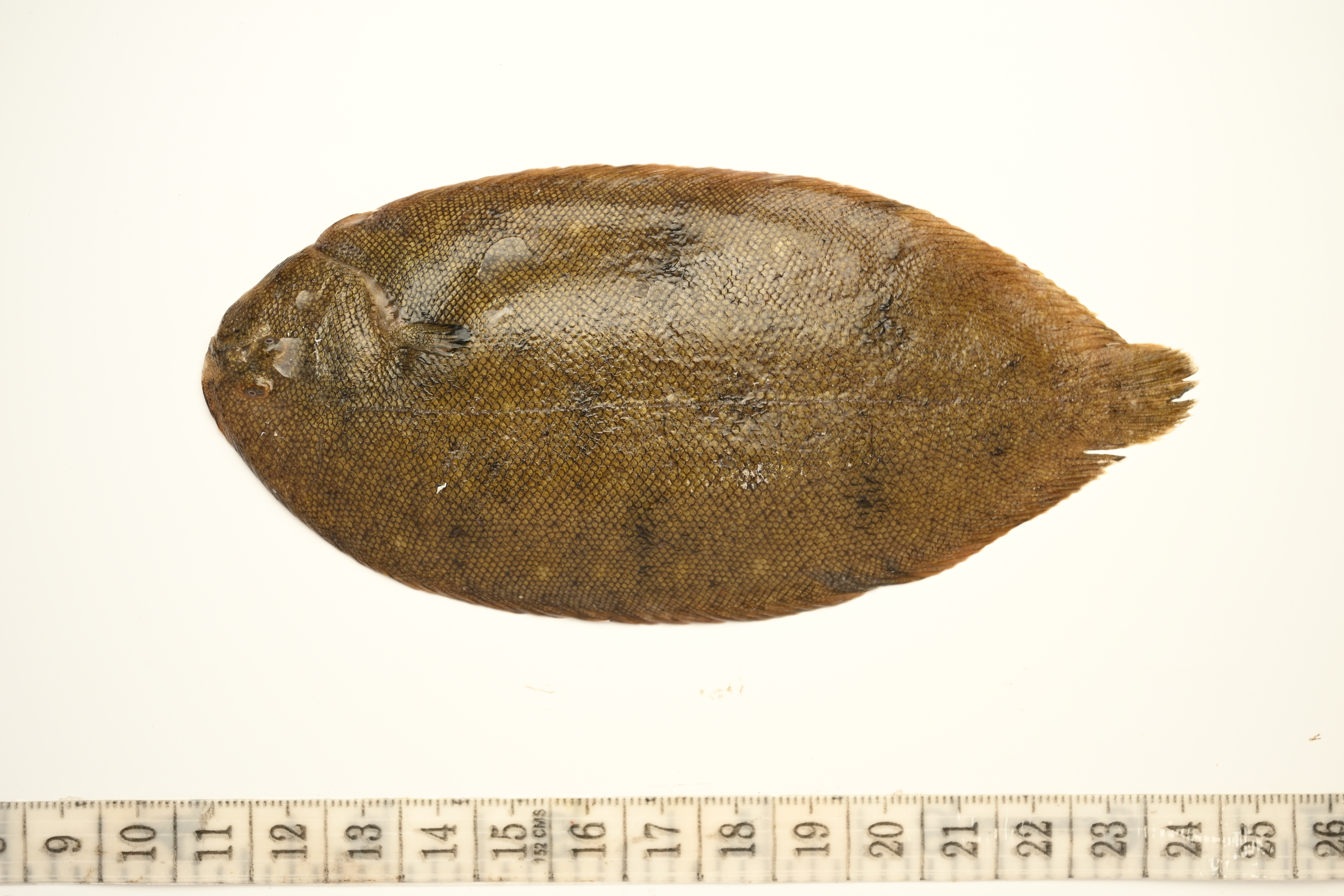
Brachirus orientalis
