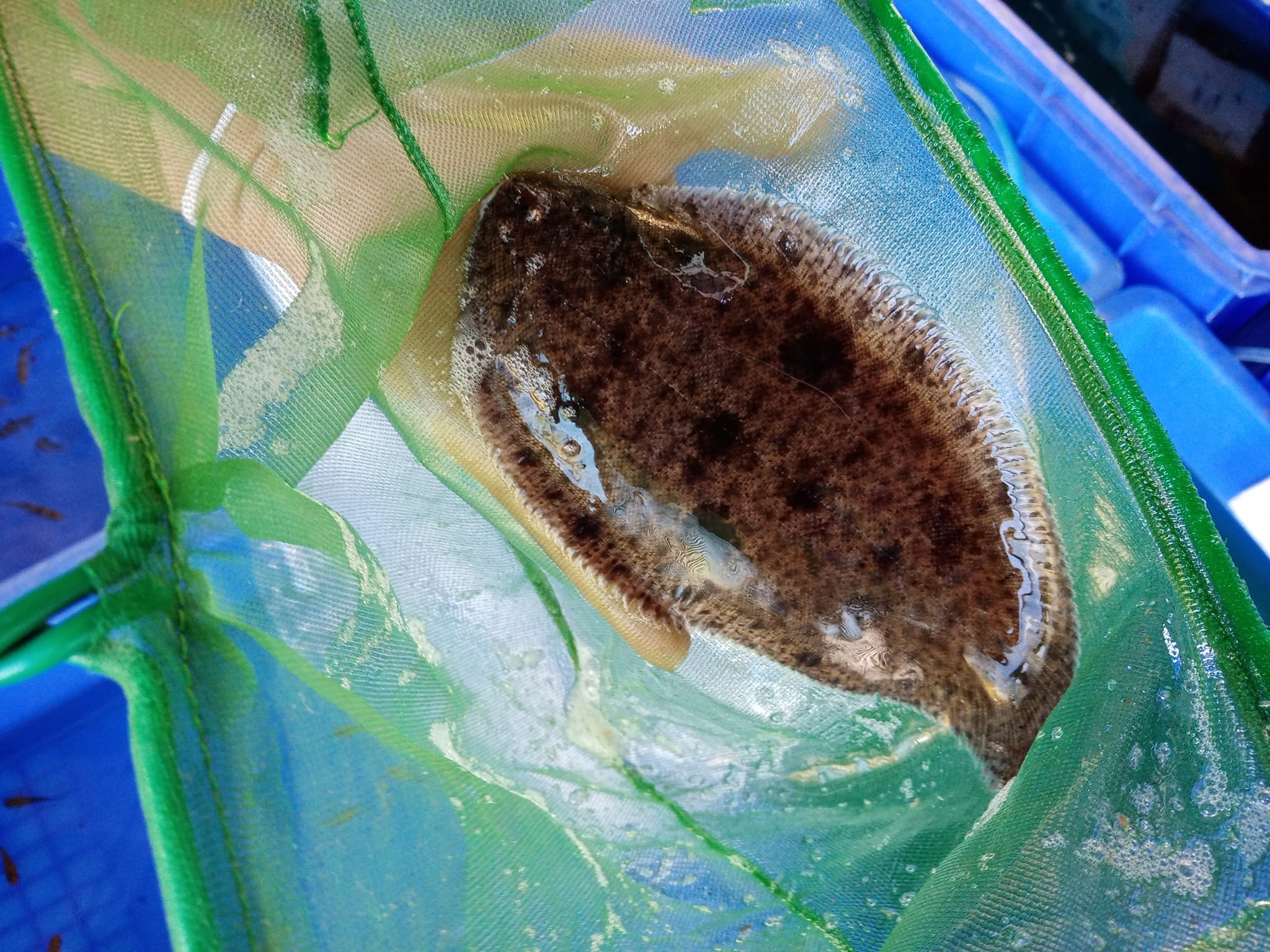

Conservation status
- Least Concern (IUCN 3.1)

Scientific classification
- Kingdom: Animalia
- Phylum: Chordata
- Class: Actinopterygii
- Order: Carangiformes
- Suborder: Pleuronectoidei
- Family: Soleidae
- Genus: Brachirus
- Species: B. panoides

Binomial name
- Brachirus panoides (Bleeker, 1851)

Synonyms
- Euryglossa panoides Bleeker, 1851; Synaptura panoides Bleeker, 1851

= Brachirus panoides =

Species of fish

Brachirus panoides, commonly known as the freshwater sole, and river sole is a species of sole in the family Soleidae.

== Description ==
A freshwater fish with an elongated, oval-shaped body. The small eyes are widely spaced, and the mouth is small with clearly tubular nostrils. Almost all fins are continuous along the body, with very small pectoral fins. The lateral line runs straight along the entire length of the body, marked with 6–7 dark vertical bars. The dorsal side is dark brown with several large dark blotches near the dorsal and anal fins. The fins have pale margins with scattered dark speckles, while the ventral side is white.

== Distribution ==
Occurs on the bottom of freshwater habitats in the central and northeastern plains of Thailand, as well as in the Mekong, particularly near its estuary into the sea.

== Size ==
The average length is about 15 cm (6 in), with the largest recorded specimen reaching 30 cm (12 in). It is the largest sole species of the genus Brachirus recorded in Thailand.

== Uses ==
In the past, Thai people living by the rivers used this fish, which belongs to a group commonly called pla lin ma (Thai: ปลาลิ้นหมา, pronounced [plaː lin maː], lit. 'dog tongue fish') in Thai and includes species known as pla lin khwai (ปลาลิ้นควาย, pronounced [plaː lin kwaːj], lit. 'buffalo tongue fish'), pla lin suea (ปลาลิ้นเสือ, pronounced [plaː lin sɯ̌a], lit. 'tiger tongue fish'), pla bai mai (ปลาใบไม้, pronounced [plaː baːj máj], lit. 'leaf fish'), or pla ta diao (ปลาตาเดียว, pronounced [plaː taː diaw], lit. 'monocle fish') named after their distinctive features, as an indicator of water quality. When these fish floated to the surface, it signaled that the water was becoming polluted, prompting locals to quickly store water for use. It is also noted that these fish can produce sounds resembling "aud aud aud". In the era when nature was still abundant, some riverside communities were filled with this distinctive croaking sound during the night. Many people were unaware that these fish could make noises. Sometimes, they could be seen clinging to house pillars or under boat hulls.

The fish is commonly consumed in dried form, sold in local markets of the central plains region of Thailand. It is also collected from the wild for the aquarium fish trade. The Chai Nat Inland Fisheries Research and Development Center has been involved in breeding this species.
