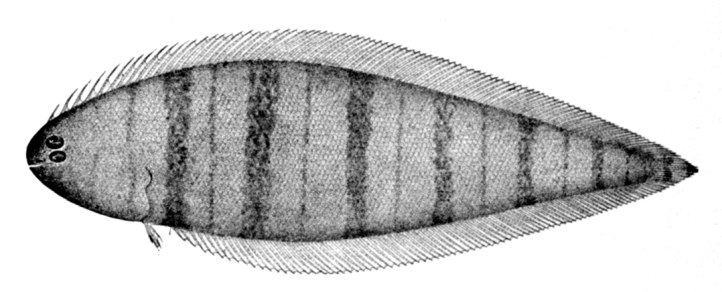
- Northern tonguefish, Symphurus pusillus

Scientific classification
- Kingdom: Animalia
- Phylum: Chordata
- Class: Actinopterygii
- Order: Carangiformes
- Suborder: Pleuronectoidei
- Family: Cynoglossidae; Jordan, 1888

Subfamilies and genera
- Subfamily Cynoglossinae Cynoglossus Paraplagusia Subfamily Symphurinae Symphurus

= Tonguefish =

Family of fishes

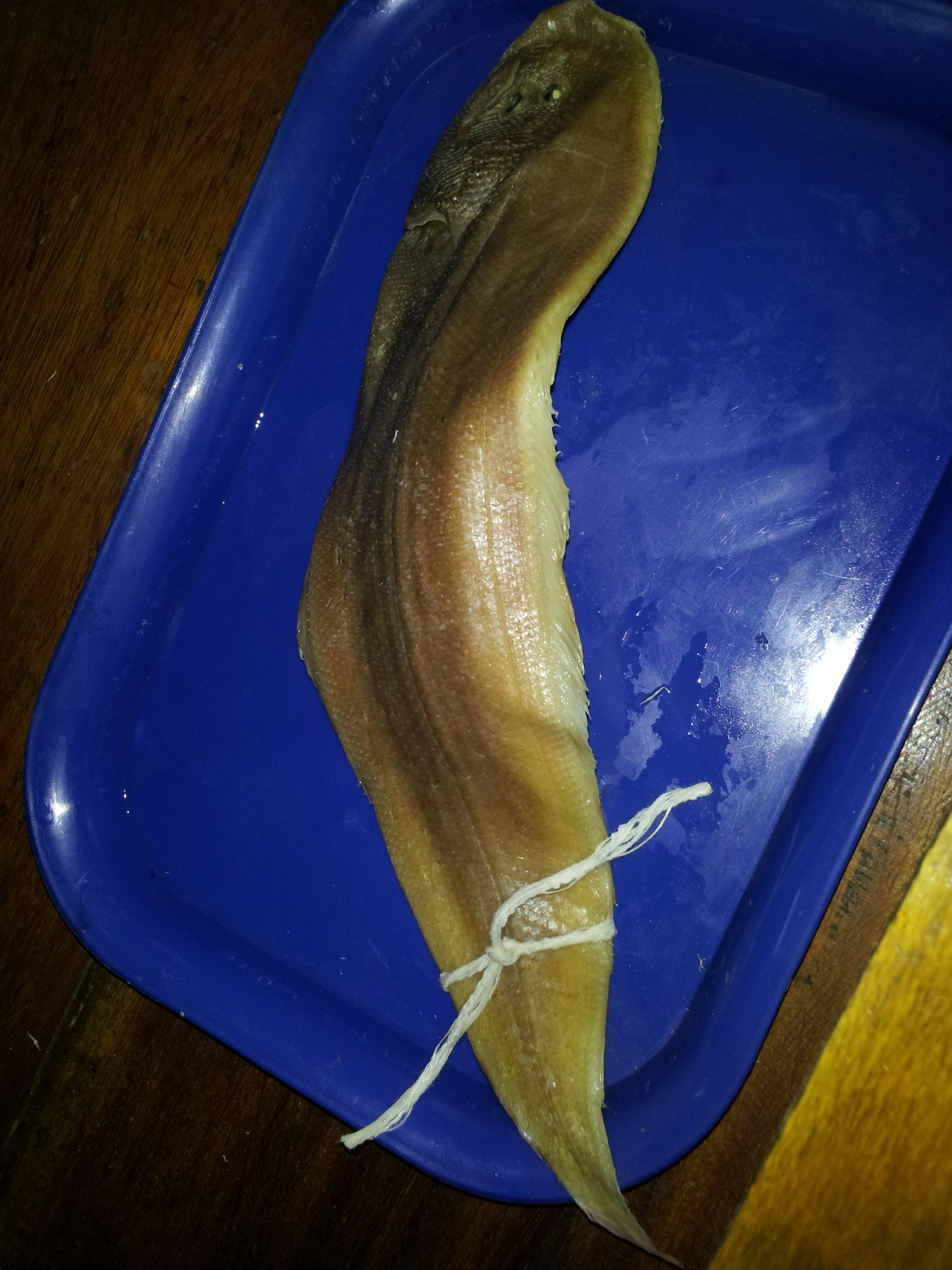
A preserved tongue sole at a lab

Tonguefishes are flatfish in the family Cynoglossidae. They are distinguished by the presence of a long hook on the snout overhanging the mouth, and the absence of pectoral fins. Their eyes are both on the left side of their bodies, which also lack a pelvic fin. This family has three genera with a total of more than 140 species. The largest reaches a length of 66 cm (26 in), though most species only reach half that size or less. They are found in tropical and subtropical oceans, mainly in shallow waters and estuaries, though some species are found in deep sea floors, and even a few in rivers.

Symphurus thermophilus lives congregating around "ponds" of sulphur at hydrothermal vents on the seafloor. No other flatfish is known from hydrothermal vents. Scientists are unsure of the mechanism that allows the fish to survive and even thrive in such a hostile environment.

== See also ==
- List of fish families
