= List of fresh water fishes of Maharashtra =

The Fresh water fish resource of Maharashtra constitutes 6 orders 25 families and 160 species. There are many species like Oriochromis, Grass carp, common carp, silver carp, etc. that have been introduced in the inland water of Maharashtra. The entire region comes under 4 basins viz. Narmada, Tapti, Godavari and Krishna. The following list is arranged taxonomically; the distribution given by many sources given in the reference section.

== Order 1: Osteoglossiformes ==
=== Family 1: notopteridae ===
1) Notopterus notopterus

2) Notopterus chitala

== Order 2: Anguilliformes ==
=== Family 2: anguillidae (freshwater eels) ===
3 Anguilla bengalensis bengalensis

== Order 3: Cypriniformes (Carps and minnows) ==
=== Family 3: cyprinidae ===
SUB - FAMILY: CYPRININAE (Barbs)

4 Catla catla

5 Cirrhinus cirrhosus

6. Cirrhinus fulungee

7. Cirrhinus macrops

8. Cirrhinus mrigala mrigala

9. Cirrhinus reba

10. Ctenopharyngodon idellus

11. Cyprinus carpio

12. Gonoproktopterus kolus

13. Gonoproktopterus lithopidos

14. Gonoproktopterus thomassi

15. Labeo ariza

16. Labeo bata

17. Labeo boga

18. Labeo boggut

19. Labeo calbasu

20. Labeo fimbriatus

21. Labeo gonius

22. Labeo kawrus

23. Labeo pangusia

24. Labeo porcellus

25. Labeo potail

26. Labeo rohita

27. Labeo sindensis

28. Neolissochilus wynaadensis

29. Oreichthys cosuatis

30. Osteobrama cotio cunma

31. Osteobrama cotio peninsularis

32. Osteobrama dayi

33. Osteobrama neilli

34. Osteobrama vigorsii

35. Osteochilus (Osteochilichthys) godavariensis

36. Osteochilus (Osteochilichthys) nashii

37. Osteochilus (Osteochilichthys) thomassi

38. Puntius amphibius

39. Puntius chola

40. Puntius carnaticus

41. Puntius deccanensis

42. Puntius dorsalis

43. Puntius fraseri

44. Puntius jerdoni

45. Puntius sahyadriensis

46. Puntius sarana sarana

47. Puntius sarana subnasutus

48. Puntius sophore

49. Puntius ticto

50. Rohtee ogilbii

51. Schismatorhynchos (Nukta) nukta

52. Thynnichthys sandkhol

53. Tor khudree

54. Tor mussulah

55. Tor tor

SUB-FAMILY: CULTRINAE

56. Chela cachius

57. Chela laubuca

58. Salmostoma acinaces

59. Salmostoma balookee

60. Salmostoma boopis

61. Salmostoma clupeoides

62. Salmostoma horai

63. Salmostoma kardahiensis

64. Salmostoma novacula

65. Salmostoma phulo

Subfamily: LEUCISCINAE

66. Hypophthalmichthys molitrix

SUBFAMILY: RASBORINAE

69. Barilius evezardi

70. Barilius gatensis

71. Parluciosoma daniconius

72. Parluciosoma labiosa

73. Danio aequipinnatus

74. Danio devario

75. Danio fraseri

76. Danio malabaricus

77. Danio rerio

78. Esomus barbatus

79. Esomus danricus

80. Esomus thermoicos

81. Amblypharyngodon mola

82. Aspidoparia morar

Subfamily: Garrinae

83. Crossocheilus latius latius

84. Garra bicornuta

85. Garra gotyla gotyla

86. Garra gotyla stenorhynchus

87. Garra mullya

88. Barbodes sarana

=== Family 4: parapsilorhynchidae ===
89. Parapsilorhynchus tentaculatus

90. Parapsilorhynchus prateri

91. Parapsilorhynchus discophorus

=== Family 5: balitoridae (loaches) ===
SUBFAMILY: BALITORINAE (HILLSTREAM LOACHES)

92. Bhavania australis (Jerdon)

SUB FAMILY: NEMACHEILINAE

93. Nemacheilus moreh

94. Nemacheilus denisoni denisoni

95. Nemacheilus evezardi

96. Nemacheilus anguilla

97. Nemacheilus rueppelli

98. Nemacheilus savona

99. Nemacheilus striatus

100. Acanthocobitis rubidipinnis

101. Balitora mysorensis

102. Indoreonectes evezardi

103. Longischistura striata

=== Family 6: cobitidae (loaches) ===
SUBFAMILY: COBITINAE

104. Lepidocephalus thermalis

105. Lepidocephalus guntea

SUBFAMILY: BOTIINAE

106. Botia striata

== Order 4 – Siluriformes (Catfishes) ==
=== Family 7: siluridae ===
107. Ompobimaculatus

108. Ompok pabo

109. Wallago attu

110. Ompok pabda

=== Family 8: bagridae (Bagrid Catfishes) ===
111. Mystus bleekeri

112. Mystus cavasius

113. Mystus gulio

114. Mystus krishnensis

115. Mystus malabaricus

116. Mystus menoda

117. Mystus montanus

118. Mystus vittatus

119. Rita kuturnee

120. Rita pavimentata

121. Rita rita

122. Rita gogra

123. Aorichthys seenghala

124. Sperata aor

=== Family 9: schilbeidae ===
SUBFAMILY: SCHILBEINAE

125. Proeutropiichthys taakree taakree

126. Silonia childreni

127. Eutropiichthys goongwaree

128. Eutropiichthys vacha

129. Neotropius khavalchor

=== Family 10: amblycipitidae ===
130. Amblyceps mangois

=== Family 11: sisoridae ===
131. Bagarius bagarius

132. Bagarius yarrelli

133. Glyptothorax conirostre poonensis

134. Glyptothorax lonah

135. Glyptothorax madraspatanum

136. Glyptothorax trewavasae

137. Nangra itchkeea

=== Family 12: clariidae ===
138. Clarias batrachus

=== Family 13: heteropneustidae ===
139. Heteropneustes fossilis

== Order 5: cyprinodontiformes ==
=== Family 14: poeciliidae (livebearers) ===
140. Gambusia affinis

141. Poecilia (Labistes) reticulata

=== Family 15: aplocheilidae ===
142. Aplocheilus lineatus

143. Aplocheilus panchax

=== Family 16: belonidae (garfishes) ===
144. Xenentodon cancila

== Order 6 - Perciformes ==
=== Family 17: ambassidae (Glass Fishes) ===
145. Chanda nama

146. Pseudambassius ranga

=== Family 18: nandidae ===
SUB FAMILY - NANDINAE

147. Nandus nandus

=== Family 19: cichlidae ===
148. Oreochromis mossambicus

149. Etroplus maculatus

=== Family 20: mugilidae ===
150. Rhinomugil corsula

=== Family 21: mastacembelidae (Spiny Eeels) ===
151. Macrognathus aral

152. Macrognathus pancalus

153. Mastacembelus armatus

=== Family 22: gobiidae (Gobies) ===
SUB FAMILY- GOBIINAE

154. Glossogobius giuris

=== Family 23: anabantidae ===
155. Anabas testudineus

=== Family 24: belontiidae (gouramies) ===
SUBFAMILY: MACROPODINAE

156. Macropodus cupanus

=== Family 25: channidae (Snakeheads, Murrels) ===
157. Channa marulius

158. Channa orientalis

159. Channa punctatus

160. Channa striatus

== See also ==
- List of fishes of Pune district
- List of fish in India
