= List of fishes of Pune district =

This is a list of the fishes of the Pune district in India. The Pune district includes the basin of the Bhima River which joins the Krishna River. The fishes recorded from this region are arranged by taxonomy.

== Order Osteoglossiformes ==
=== Suborder Notopteridei ===
==== Family: Noptopteridae ====
1. Notopterus chitla (Pallas)
2. Notopterus notopterus (Pallas)

== Order Anguilliformes ==
=== Suborder Anguilloidae ===
==== Family: Anguillidae (Freshwater eels) ====
1. Anguilla bengalensis (Gray)

== Order Cypriniformes ==
=== Suborder Cyprinoidei ===
==== Family: Cyprinidae ====
Subfamily Cultrinae

1. Chela cachius (Hamilton-Buchanan)
2. Chela laubuca (Hamilton)
3. Salmostoma acinaces (Valenciennes)
4. Salmostoma boopis (Day)
5. Salmostoma clupoides (Bloch)
6. Salmostoma novacula (Valenciennes)
7. Salmostoma phulo (Hamilton)

Subfamily Rasborinae

1. Amblypharyngodon mola (Hamilton - Buchanan)
2. Barilius barna (Hamilton-Buchanan)
3. Barilius bendelisis (Hamilton - Buchanan)
4. Barilius gatensis (Valenciennes)
5. Danio aequipinnatus (McClelland)
6. Danio devario (Hamilton- Buchnan)
7. Danio malabaricus (Jerdon)
8. Parluciosoma daniconius (Hamilton - Buchanan)
9. Parluciosoma labiosa (Mukerji)

Subfamily Cyprininae

1. Cyprinus carpio Linnaeus
2. Tor khudree (Sykes)
3. Tor mussulah (Sykes)
4. Osteobrama cotio peninsularis (Silas)
5. Osteobrama cotio cunma (Silas)
6. Osteobrama cotio neilli (Day)
7. Osteobrama cotio vigorsii (Sykes)
8. Osteocheilus godavarinsis (Rao)
9. Osteocheilus nashii (Day)
10. Osteocheilus thomassi (Day)
11. Puntius sarana sarana (Hamilton - Buchanan)
12. Puntius sarana subnasutus (Valenciennes)
13. Puntius amphibius (Valenciennes)
14. Puntius arenatus (Day)
15. Puntius chola (Hamilton-Buchanan)
16. Puntius conchonius (Hamilton-Buchanan)
17. Puntius dorsalis (Jerdon)
18. Puntius jerdoni (Day)
19. Puntius melanostigma (Day)
20. Puntius sophore (Hamilton - Buchanan)
21. Puntius ticto (Hamilton - Buchanan)
22. Rohetee ogilbii (Sykes)
23. Schismatirhyncus nukta (Sykes)
24. Gonoproktopterus kolus (Sykes)
25. Gonoproktopterus thomassi (Day)
26. Catla catla (Hamilton - Buchanan)
27. Cirrhinus cirrhosus (Bloch)
28. Cirrhinus mrigala (Hamilton - Buchanan)
29. Cirrhinus reba (Hamilton - Buchanan)
30. Labeo fulungee (Sykes)
31. Labeo rohita (Hamilton - Buchanan)
32. Labeo ariza (Hamilton - Buchanan)
33. Labeo boggut (Sykes)
34. Labeo calbasu (Hamilton - Buchanan)
35. Labeo fimbriatus (Bloch.)
36. Labeo kawrus (Sykes)
37. Labeo porcellus (Heckel)
38. Labeo potail (Sykes)
39. Labeo sindensis (Day
40. Neolissochilus wynaadensis (Day)

Subfamily Cyprininae

1. Garra mullya (Sykes)
2. Garra gotyla gotyla (Gray)
3. Crossocheilus latius latius (Hamilton- Buchanan)

==== Family: Parapsilorhynchidae ====
1. Parapsilorhynchus tentaculatus (Annandale)

==== Family: Balitoridae ====
Subfamily: Nemacheilinae

1. Nemacheilus anguilla Annandale
2. Nemacheilus denisoni dayi Hora
3. Nemacheilus denisoni denisoni Day
4. Nemacheilus evezardi Day
5. Nemacheilus moreh (Sykes)
6. Nemacheilus rueppelli (Sykes)
7. Nemacheilus savona (Hamilton-Buchanan)
8. Nemacheilus striatus Day

==== Family: Cobitidae ====
Subfamily Cobitinae

1. Lepidocephalus thermalis (Valenciennes)
2. Lepidocephalus guntea (Hamilton-Buchanan)

== Order – Siluriformes ==
=== Family: Siluridae ===
1. Ompok bimaculatus (Bloch)
2. Ompok pabo (Hamilton)
3. Wallagu attu (Schneider)

=== Family: Schibeidae ===
Subfamily Schibeinae

1. Proeutropiichthys taakree taakree (Sykes)
2. Silonia childreni (Sykes)

=== Family: Bagridae ===
Subfamily Bagrinae

1. Mystus bleekeri (Day)
2. Mystus cavacius (Hamilton- Buchanan)
3. Mystus gulio (Hamilton-Buchanan)
4. Mystus malabaricus (Jerdon)
5. Aorichthys seenghala (Sykes)
6. Rita kuturnee (Sykes)
7. Rita pavimentata (Valenciennes)
8. Rita rita (Hamilton- Buchanan)

=== Family: Sisoridae ===
1. Bagarius bagarius (Hamilton- Buchanan)
2. Bagarius yarrelli Sykes
3. Glyptothorax conirostre poonensis Hora
4. Glyptothorax lonah (Sykes)
5. Glyptothorax madraspatanum (Day)
6. Nangra itchkeea (Sykes)

=== Family: Heteropneustidae ===
1. Heteropneustes fossilis (Bloch)

=== Family: Aplocheilidae ===
1. Aplocheilus lineatus (Valenciennes)
2. Aplocheilus panchax (Hamilton - Buchanan)

=== Family: Poeciliidae ===
1. Gambusia affinis (Baird & Girard)
2. Poecilia reticulata Peters
3. Xiphophorus hellerii Heckel

=== Family: Clariidae ===
1. Clarias batrachus (Linnaeus)

== Order Beloniformes ==
=== Suborder Belonoidei (= Exocoetoidei) ===
==== Family: Belonidae ====
1. Xenentodon cancila (Hamilton- Buchanan)

== Family: Mastacembelidae ==
1. Macrognathus aral (Bloch and Schneider)
2. Macrognathus pancalus Hamilton – Buchanan
3. Mastacembelus armatus (Lacepede)

== Order Perciformes ==
=== Suborder Percoidei ===
==== Family: Chandidae ====
1. Chanda nama (Hamilton- Buchanan)
2. Pseudoambassius ranga (Hamilton- Buchanan)

==== Family: Mugilidae ====
1. Rhinomugil corsula (Hamilton-Buchanan)

==== Family: Nandidae ====
1. Nandus nandus (Hamilton- Buchanan)

=== Suborder Labroidei ===
==== Family: Cichlidae ====
1. Oreochromis mossambica (Peters)

=== Suborder Gobioidei ===
==== Family: Gobiidae ====
1. Glossogobius giuris (Hamilton- Buchanan)

== Family: Belontiidae ==
1. Macropodus cupanus (Valenciennes)

=== Suborder Channoidei ===
==== Family: Channidae ====
1. Channa punctatus (Bloch)
2. Channa striatus (Bloch)
3. Channa orientalis Bloch and Schneider
4. Channa marulius (Hamilton-Buchanan)

== See also ==
- List of fish in India
