= Puntius crescentus =

Conservation status
- Endangered (IUCN 3.1)

Scientific classification
- Kingdom: Animalia
- Phylum: Chordata
- Class: Actinopterygii
- Order: Cypriniformes
- Family: Cyprinidae
- Subfamily: Smiliogastrinae
- Genus: Puntius
- Species: P. crescentus

Binomial name
- Puntius crescentus Yazdani & D. F. Singh, 1994

Species of fish

Puntius crescentus is a species of freshwater ray-fiined fish belonging to the family Cyprinidae. the family which includes the carps, barbs and related fishes. This species is endemic to India.
