= Puntius viridis =

Scientific classification
- Domain: Eukaryota
- Kingdom: Animalia
- Phylum: Chordata
- Class: Actinopterygii
- Order: Cypriniformes
- Family: Cyprinidae
- Genus: Puntius
- Species: P. viridis

Binomial name
- Puntius viridis Plamoottil & Abraham, 2014

Species of fish

Puntius viridis, the spot-fin green barb, is a species of barbs native to the Manimala River in Kerala, India.This species reaches a length of 8.1 cm (3.2 in).
