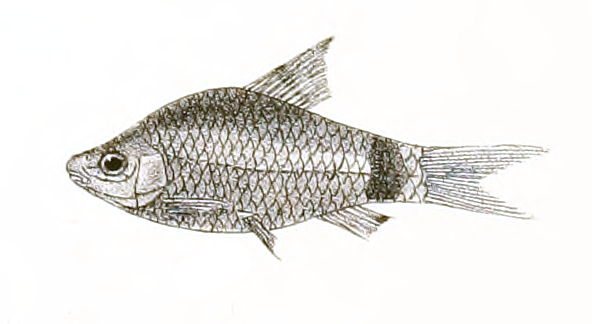

Scientific classification
- Domain: Eukaryota
- Kingdom: Animalia
- Phylum: Chordata
- Class: Actinopterygii
- Order: Cypriniformes
- Family: Cyprinidae
- Subfamily: Smiliogastrinae
- Genus: Puntius
- Species: P. puntio

Binomial name
- Puntius puntio (F. Hamilton, 1822)

Synonyms
- Cyprinus puntio Hamilton, 1822; Barbus puntio (Hamilton, 1822)

= Puntio barb =

Species of fish

The puntio barb (Puntius puntio) is a species inquirenda of ray-finned fish in the genus Puntius. It is found in India, Bangladesh and Myanmar. Its species description does not agree with any known species and there is no type specimen.
