= Puntius pugio =

Conservation status
- Least Concern (IUCN 3.1)

Scientific classification
- Kingdom: Animalia
- Phylum: Chordata
- Class: Actinopterygii
- Order: Cypriniformes
- Family: Cyprinidae
- Subfamily: Smiliogastrinae
- Genus: Puntius
- Species: P. pugio

Binomial name
- Puntius pugio S. O. Kullander, 2008

Species of fish

Puntius pugio is a species of ray-finned fish in the genus Puntius. It is found in Myanmar.
