= Puntius layardi =

Conservation status
- Data Deficient (IUCN 3.1)

Scientific classification
- Kingdom: Animalia
- Phylum: Chordata
- Class: Actinopterygii
- Order: Cypriniformes
- Family: Cyprinidae
- Subfamily: Smiliogastrinae
- Genus: Puntius
- Species: P. layardi

Binomial name
- Puntius layardi Günther, 1868

Synonyms
- Barbus layardi Günther, 1868

Species of fish

Puntius layardi, Layard's barb, is a species of freshwater ray-fiined fish belonging to the family Cyprinidae. the family which includes the carps, barbs and related fishes. It is found in Sri Lanka.
