= Velankanni =

- Special Grade Town Panchayat
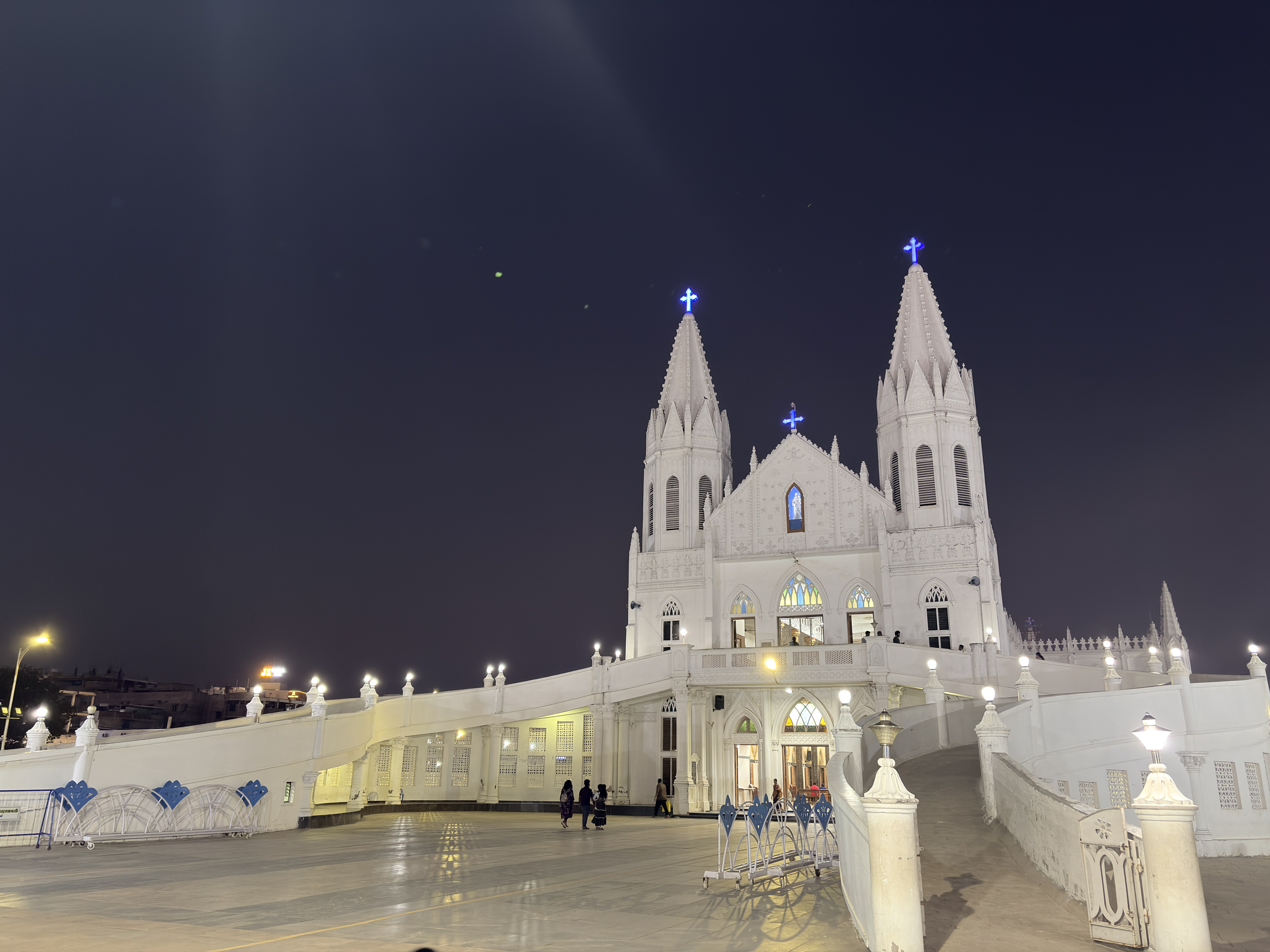
- Basilica of Our Lady of Good Health in 2026

- Vailankanni, Tamil Nadu
- Coordinates: 10.681900°N 79.843700°E
- Country: India
- State: Tamil Nadu
- District: Nagapattinam

Government
  - Type: Special Grade Town Panchayat
  - Body: Velankanni Special Grade Town Panchayat

Area
  - Total: 5.5 km^{2} (2.1 sq mi)
- Elevation: 29 m (95 ft)

Population (2001)
  - Total: 10,144
  - Density: 1,800/km^{2} (4,800/sq mi)

Languages
  - Official: Tamil
- Time zone: UTC+5:30 (IST)
- PIN: 611111
- Telephone code: 04365
- Vehicle registration: TN-51
- Website: www.nagapattinam.tn.nic.in/church.html

Velankanni (Vēḷāṅkaṇṇi) is a special grade town panchayat in Nagapattinam district in the Indian state of Tamil Nadu. It lies on the Coromandel Coast of the Bay of Bengal, 350 km south of Chennai (Madras), 12 km south of Nagapattinam, and 33 km southeast of Thiruvarur.

A canal built to link this town with Vedaranyam still lies to the west. The Vellayar, a minor branch of the Cauvery River, runs south of the town and discharges into the sea. The town was among the worst hit by the tsunami caused by the 2004 Indian Ocean earthquake.

The town is home to one of the most visited Latin Catholic shrines called the Basilica of Our Lady of Good Health.

Velankanni has been chosen as one of the heritage cities for the Heritage City Development and Augmentation Yojana (HRIDAY) scheme of the Government of India.

== Demographics ==
The 2001 Indian census indicated Velankanni had a population of 10,145. Males constitute 48% of the population and females 52%. Citizens there have an average literacy rate of 69%, higher than the national average of 68%: male literacy is 75%, and female literacy is 64%. 12% of the population is under six years of age.

Religion in Velankanni town
1. Hinduism (61.9%)
2. Christianity (31.2%)
3. Islam (6.30%)
4. Other (0.67%)

== 2004 Tsunami ==
Velankanni was among the worst hit by the massive 26 December tsunami that was triggered by the 2004 Indian Ocean earthquake. The tsunami struck at around 9.30 am on Sunday, when pilgrims from Kerala were inside the church attending the Malayalam Mass. The rising water level did not enter the shrine, but the receding waters swept away hundreds of pilgrims who were on the beach.

The shrine's compound, nearby villages, hundreds of shops, homes and pilgrims were washed away into the sea. About 600 pilgrims died. Rescue teams extricated more than 400 bodies from the sand and rocks in the vicinity and large number of unidentified bodies were buried in mass graves.

== Geography ==
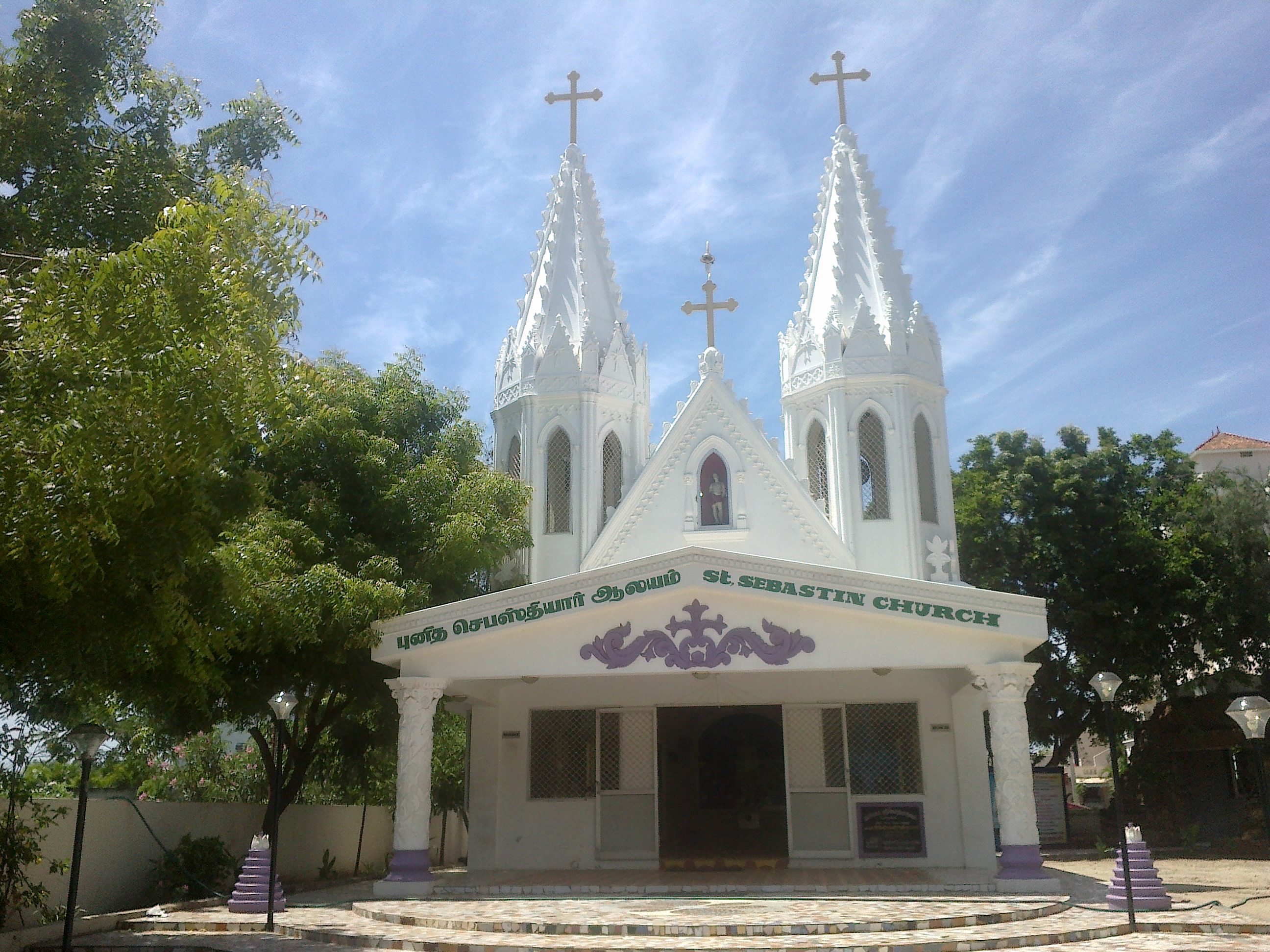
St Sebastian Church at the entrance of the city

Vailankanni is located 350 kilometres (220 mi) south of Chennai and 14 kilometres (8.7 mi) south of Nagapattinam on the Coromandel Coast, at 10.40°N 79.49°E in Nagapattinam district of Tamil Nadu state.

=== Climate ===
Climate data for Velankanni, Tamil Nadu
Month	Jan	Feb	Mar	Apr	May	Jun	Jul	Aug	Sep	Oct	Nov	Dec	Year
Mean daily maximum °C (°F)	28.5 (83.3)	29.5 (85.1)	31.8 (89.2)	33.8 (92.8)	35.7 (96.3)	36.2 (97.2)	35.1 (95.2)	34.1 (93.4)	33.7 (92.7)	31.6 (88.9)	29.3 (84.7)	28.0 (82.4)	32.3 (90.1)
Mean daily minimum °C (°F)	21.9 (71.4)	22.8 (73.0)	24.3 (75.7)	26.2 (79.2)	26.8 (80.2)	26.3 (79.3)	26.3 (79.3)	25.2 (77.4)	25.3 (77.5)	24.6 (76.3)	23.4 (74.1)	22.4 (72.3)	24.6 (76.3)
Average precipitation mm (inches)	54 (2.1)	11 (0.4)	14 (0.6)	34 (1.3)	37 (1.5)	35 (1.4)	61 (2.4)	75 (3.0)	83 (3.3)	236 (9.3)	400 (15.7)	291 (11.5)	1,331 (52.5)
Source: Climate-Data.org

=== Fauna ===
Puntius sanctus is a rare species of barb fish found exclusively on a small body of water at Velankanni

== Tourist Attractions ==
=== Basilica of Our Lady of Good Health ===
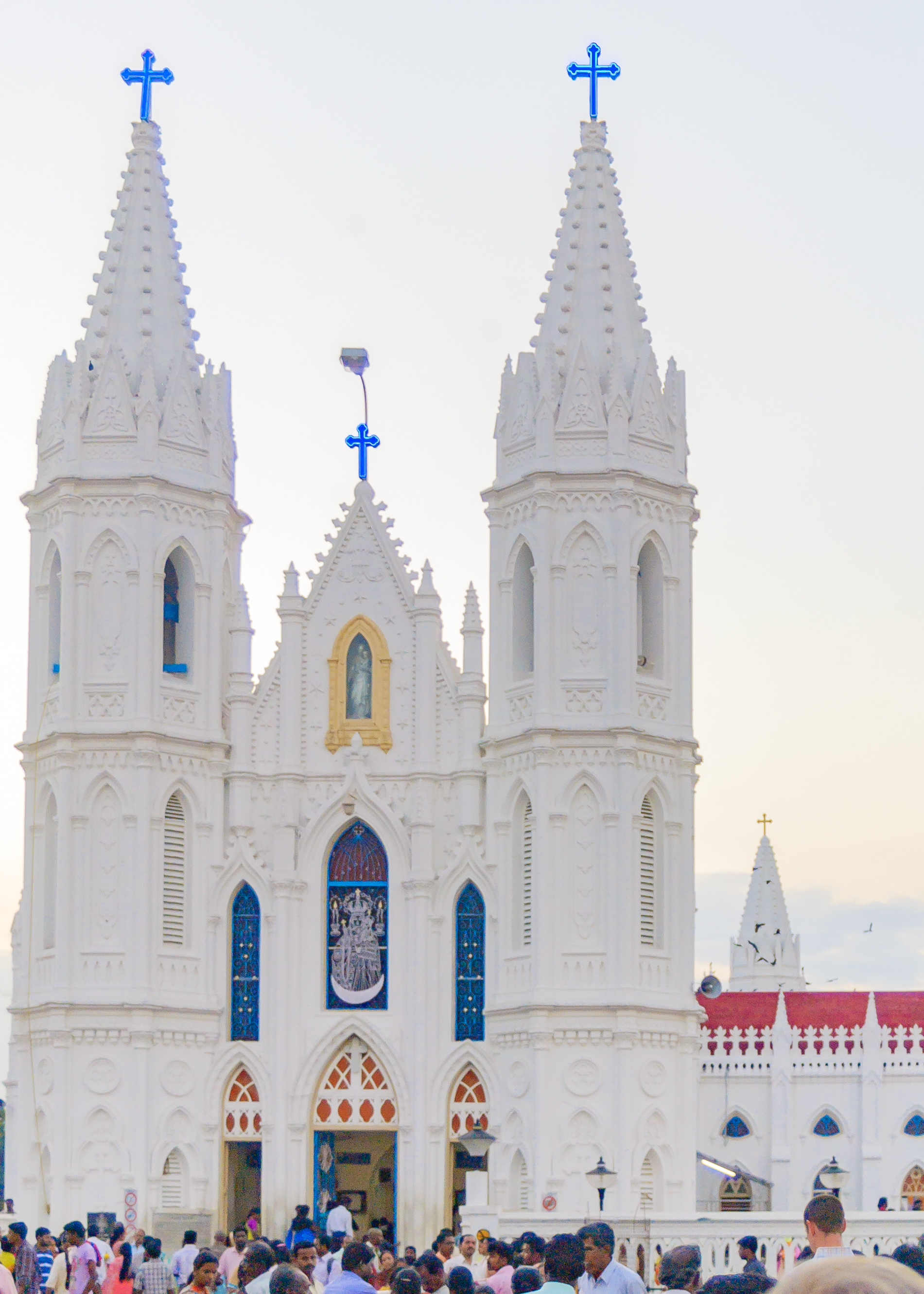
Basilica of Our Lady of Good Health

Basilica of Our Lady of Good Health, one of the country's biggest Catholic pilgrimage centres is located here. Devoted to Our Lady of Good Health, it is popularly known as the "Lourdes of the East". Its origins can be traced back to the 16th century. It is built in the Gothic style, was modified by Portuguese and then further expanded later on due to the influx of pilgrims. The church building was raised to the status of basilica in 1962 by Pope John XXIII.

Annually, 20 million pilgrims flock to the shrine from all over India and abroad, out of which an estimated 3 million people visit the shrine during its annual festival from 29 August to 8 September. The 11-day annual festival concludes with the celebration of the Feast of the Nativity of Mary on 8 September.

== Transportation ==
Vailankanni is well connected by road and rail to the rest of the country. The East Coast Road (ECR) that runs from Chennai to Kanyakumari, connects the town to the rest of the country. The nearest operational airports are Tiruchirappalli International Airport, 165 kilometres (103 mi) away and Chennai International Airport, 300 kilometres (190 mi) away.

=== Road ===
Due to the large number of pilgrims that visit this town, the Tamil Nadu State Transport Corporation (TNSTC), State Express Transport Corporation (SETC) and several private bus operators ply to cities like Bengaluru, Chennai, Coimbatore, Ernakulam, Muvattupuzha, Madurai, Sengottai, Nagercoil, Salem, Thoothukudi, Tirunelveli and Trivandrum. The Kerala State Road Transport Corporation runs a daily bus service to Changanassery and Cherthala.

The TNSTC–Kumbakonam division operates intercity buses to Tiruchirappalli, Thanjavur, Pudukkottai, Karaikudi, Tiruvarur, Kumbakonam, Thiruthuraipoondi, Pattukkottai, Pondicherry, Karaikal and Nagapattinam from Velankanni.

=== Rail ===
Velankanni railway station is a terminal station on the 10-kilometre-long Nagapattinam–Velankanni broad-gauge line. The foundation stone of the line was laid in 1999 and it was completed in 2010 at a cost of Rs. 48 crores. The line is part of the Tiruchirappalli railway division of Southern Railway zone of the Indian Railways.

As of 2023, there are no daily regular trains operated between Chennai and Vailankanni. The Vasco da Gama–Velankanni Weekly Express between Vasco da Gama, Goa and Velankanni is operated by South Western Railway zone. Apart from the express trains, two passenger trains are also operated daily, one each to Karaikal and Nagapattinam. Special trains are operated from places like Chennai, Mumbai, Secunderabad, Bengaluru, Vasco da Gama, Kollam, Ernakulam, Tirunelveli and Nagercoil during the months of August and September for the annual church feast.

== Education ==
Our Lady of Health Higher Secondary School, Our Lady of Health Middle School, Our Lady of Health Elementary School, Infant Jesus Primary School (English Medium) and Christ the King High School Special School for Handicapped and Deaf & Dumb Children are five schools situated in Velankanni town.

== See also ==
- Catholic Church in India
- Basilica of Our Lady of Good Health
