= Puntius morehensis =

Scientific classification
- Domain: Eukaryota
- Kingdom: Animalia
- Phylum: Chordata
- Class: Actinopterygii
- Order: Cypriniformes
- Family: Cyprinidae
- Genus: Puntius
- Species: P. morehensis

Binomial name
- Puntius morehensis Arunkumar & Tombi Singh, 1998

Species of fish

Puntius morehensis is a species of ray-finned fish in the genus Puntius from India.
