= Puntius euspilurus =

Scientific classification
- Domain: Eukaryota
- Kingdom: Animalia
- Phylum: Chordata
- Class: Actinopterygii
- Order: Cypriniformes
- Family: Cyprinidae
- Genus: Puntius
- Species: P. euspilurus

Binomial name
- Puntius euspilurus Plamoottil, 2016

Species of fish

Puntius euspilurus is a species of barbs native to the Mananthavady River in Kerala, India. This species reaches a length of 8 cm (3.1 in).
