= Puntius takhoaensis =

Scientific classification
- Kingdom: Animalia
- Phylum: Chordata
- Class: Actinopterygii
- Division: Teleostei
- Order: Cypriniformes
- Family: Cyprinidae
- Subfamily: Smiliogastrinae
- Genus: Puntius
- Species: P. takhoaensis

Binomial name
- Puntius takhoaensis V. H. Nguyễn & L. H. Doan, 1969

Species of fish

Puntius takhoaensis is a species of ray-finned fish in the genus Puntius. It is found in Vietnam.
