= Puntius kyphus =

Scientific classification
- Domain: Eukaryota
- Kingdom: Animalia
- Phylum: Chordata
- Class: Actinopterygii
- Order: Cypriniformes
- Family: Cyprinidae
- Genus: Puntius
- Species: P. kyphus

Binomial name
- Puntius kyphus Plamoottil, 2019

Species of fish

Puntius kyphus, is a species of barbs from a stream near Thiruvalla, India. This species reaches a length of 9 cm (3.5 in).
