= Puntius tetraspilus =

Conservation status
- Data Deficient (IUCN 3.1)

Scientific classification
- Kingdom: Animalia
- Phylum: Chordata
- Class: Actinopterygii
- Order: Cypriniformes
- Family: Cyprinidae
- Subfamily: Smiliogastrinae
- Genus: Puntius
- Species: P. tetraspilus

Binomial name
- Puntius tetraspilus (Günther, 1868)

Synonyms
- Barbus tetraspilus Günther, 1868; Leuciscus binotatus Blyth, 1858; Barbus innominatus Day, 1870; Neolissochilus innominatus (Day, 1870)

Species of fish

Puntius tetraspilus is a species of ray-finned fish in the genus Puntius from Sri Lanka.
