= Puntius sanctus =

Scientific classification
- Kingdom: Animalia
- Phylum: Chordata
- Class: Actinopterygii
- Order: Cypriniformes
- Family: Cyprinidae
- Genus: Puntius
- Species: P. sanctus

Binomial name
- Puntius sanctus Plamoottil, 2020

Species of fish

Puntius sanctus is a species of barb native to a small body of water at Velankanni of Tamil Nadu, India. This species reaches a length of 9.4 cm (3.7 in).
