= Puntius nangalensis =

Conservation status
- Endangered (IUCN 3.1)

Scientific classification
- Kingdom: Animalia
- Phylum: Chordata
- Class: Actinopterygii
- Order: Cypriniformes
- Family: Cyprinidae
- Subfamily: Smiliogastrinae
- Genus: Puntius
- Species: P. nangalensis

Binomial name
- Puntius nangalensis Jayaram, 1990

Species of fish

Puntius nangalensis is a species of cyprinid fish endemic to India. It inhabits littoral areas of lakes.
