= Longfin Kerala barb =

Scientific classification
- Domain: Eukaryota
- Kingdom: Animalia
- Phylum: Chordata
- Class: Actinopterygii
- Order: Cypriniformes
- Family: Cyprinidae
- Subfamily: Smiliogastrinae
- Genus: Puntius
- Species: P. dolichopterus

Binomial name
- Puntius dolichopterus Plamoottil, 2015

Species of fish

The longfin Kerala barb (Puntius dolichopterus) is a species of fish in the family Cyprinidae. The species has been discovered, named and described by Prof. Dr. Mathews Plamoottil, Head of the Department of Zoology, Baby John Memorial Govt. College, Chavara, Kollam, Kerala. It was collected from a small water stream flowing in the heart of Alappuzha district's Kayamkulam city in Kerala, India.

== Description ==
Its body is silvery, dorsal fin is light orange red in color, pectoral and anal fin is greenish yellow in color, with ventral fin yellow, caudal fin dusky and it also has a dusky spot present on 21 and 22 scales. Pectoral fin longer and it reaches ventral fin. Many longitudinal lines present below lateral line.
