= Cauvery barb =

Conservation status
- Endangered (IUCN 3.1)

Scientific classification
- Kingdom: Animalia
- Phylum: Chordata
- Class: Actinopterygii
- Order: Cypriniformes
- Family: Cyprinidae
- Subfamily: Smiliogastrinae
- Genus: Puntius
- Species: P. cauveriensis

Binomial name
- Puntius cauveriensis (Hora, 1937)

Synonyms
- Barbus cauveriensis Hora, 1937

Species of fish

The Cauvery barb (Puntius cauveriensis) is a species of cyprinid fish endemic to the Cauvery River in Karnataka, India.
