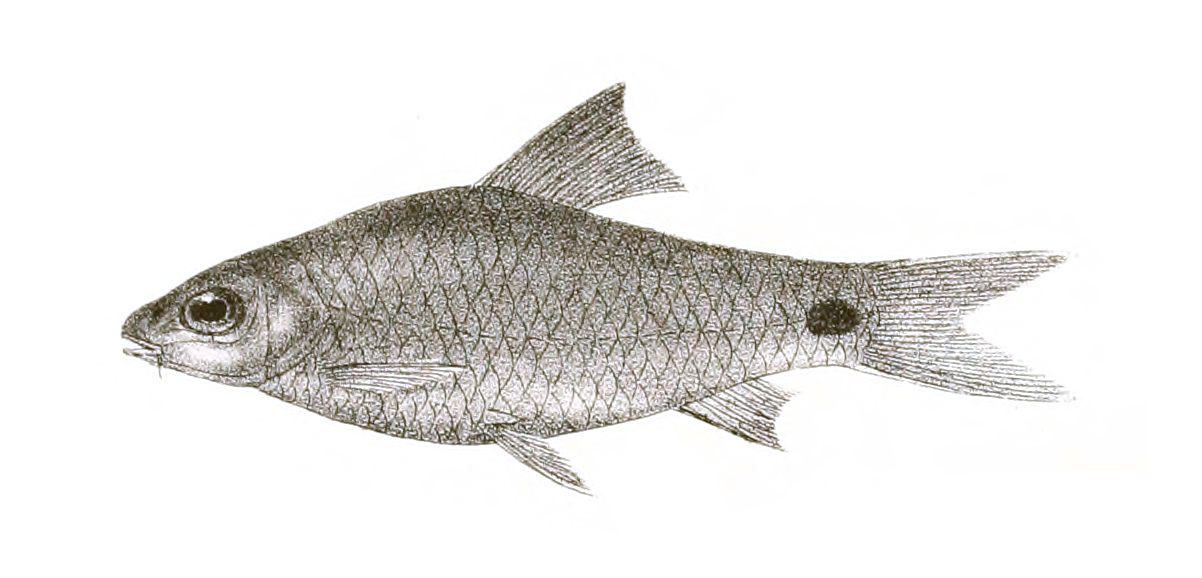

Scientific classification
- Domain: Eukaryota
- Kingdom: Animalia
- Phylum: Chordata
- Class: Actinopterygii
- Order: Cypriniformes
- Family: Cyprinidae
- Subfamily: Smiliogastrinae
- Genus: Puntius
- Species: P. melanostigma

Binomial name
- Puntius melanostigma (F. Day, 1878)

Synonyms
- Barbus melanostigma Day, 1878

= Puntius melanostigma =

Species of fish

Puntius melanostigma is a species of ray-finned fish in the genus Puntius from India.
