= Malabar black-backed barb =

Scientific classification
- Kingdom: Animalia
- Phylum: Chordata
- Class: Actinopterygii
- Order: Cypriniformes
- Family: Cyprinidae
- Subfamily: Smiliogastrinae
- Genus: Puntius
- Species: P. nigronotus

Binomial name
- Puntius nigronotus Plamoottil, 2014

Species of fish

The Malabar black-backed barb (Puntius nigronotus) is a species of fish in the family Cyprinidae in the Puntius genus. The species has been discovered in 2012, named and described by Prof. Dr. Mathews Plamoottil, Head of the Department of Zoology, Baby John Memorial Govt. College, Chavara, Kollam, Kerala in 2014. The study and paper on the fish was published in international publications like Journal of Research in Biology in December the same year (2014). It was collected from Mananthavady river in the high altitude hilly Wayanad district in Kerala, India (Western Ghats region). The specific name 'nigronotus (Greek : nigra) refers to the color of the blackish back side of the fish.

== Distribution ==
It is so for known only from Mananthavady River in Mananthavady it has its origin in Western Ghats . There is a good chance of finding them in Kabani River also the holotype ZSI FF 5285 as Mananthavady river joins the Kabani river. Little is exploited here as it is inside the Nilgiri biosphere area.

== Description ==
The holotype ZSI FF 5285 was found on the Mananthavady river in the high altitude hilly Wayanad district in Kerala The Malabar black-backed barb is different from the rest of the Puntius species by many features. The length of the holotype specimen was 105.1 millimeter. Unique features of this fish are Black colored back side, shorter maxillary barbels, small width of mouth gape, a higher body, a row of long tiny black color dots on the fin of back and the other fin on back is short and it has 9 branched rays and the last dorsal fin ray is not branched and it is very weak and it is ossified and pliable. There are branched 6 rays in anal fin and 27 scales in the side. Another unique feature is the position of the eye which is placed behind and above the jaws angle and bulging above the head making it visible from below and the nostrils are in form of short tubes protruding out.

== Color ==
The fish is colored dark black in dorsal area and blackish brown in side, the under side is silvery white and the dorsal fin is pale orange red in color. Fins (pectoral, pelvic, anal) are whitish-yellow in color except the caudal fin which is dirty yellow in color. There are some long black spots in the dorsal fin rays and in the caudal blotch there is a small patch of bluish black dots in a scale.

== Habitat ==
The collection location of the fish is the fast flowing clear watered Mananthavady river in hilly Wayand district of Kerala.
