= Puntius mudumalaiensis =

Conservation status
- Vulnerable (IUCN 3.1)

Scientific classification
- Kingdom: Animalia
- Phylum: Chordata
- Class: Actinopterygii
- Order: Cypriniformes
- Family: Cyprinidae
- Subfamily: Smiliogastrinae
- Genus: Puntius
- Species: P. mudumalaiensis

Binomial name
- Puntius mudumalaiensis Menon & Rema Devi, 1992

Species of fish

Puntius mudumalaiensis is a species of ray-finned fish in the genus Puntius. It is found in Tamil Nadu, India.
