= Puntius muzaffarpurensis =

Scientific classification
- Domain: Eukaryota
- Kingdom: Animalia
- Phylum: Chordata
- Class: Actinopterygii
- Order: Cypriniformes
- Family: Cyprinidae
- Subfamily: Smiliogastrinae
- Genus: Puntius
- Species: P. muzaffarpurensis

Binomial name
- Puntius muzaffarpurensis Srivastava, Verma & Sharma, 1977

Species of fish

Puntius muzaffarpurensis is a species of cyprinid fish native to India.
