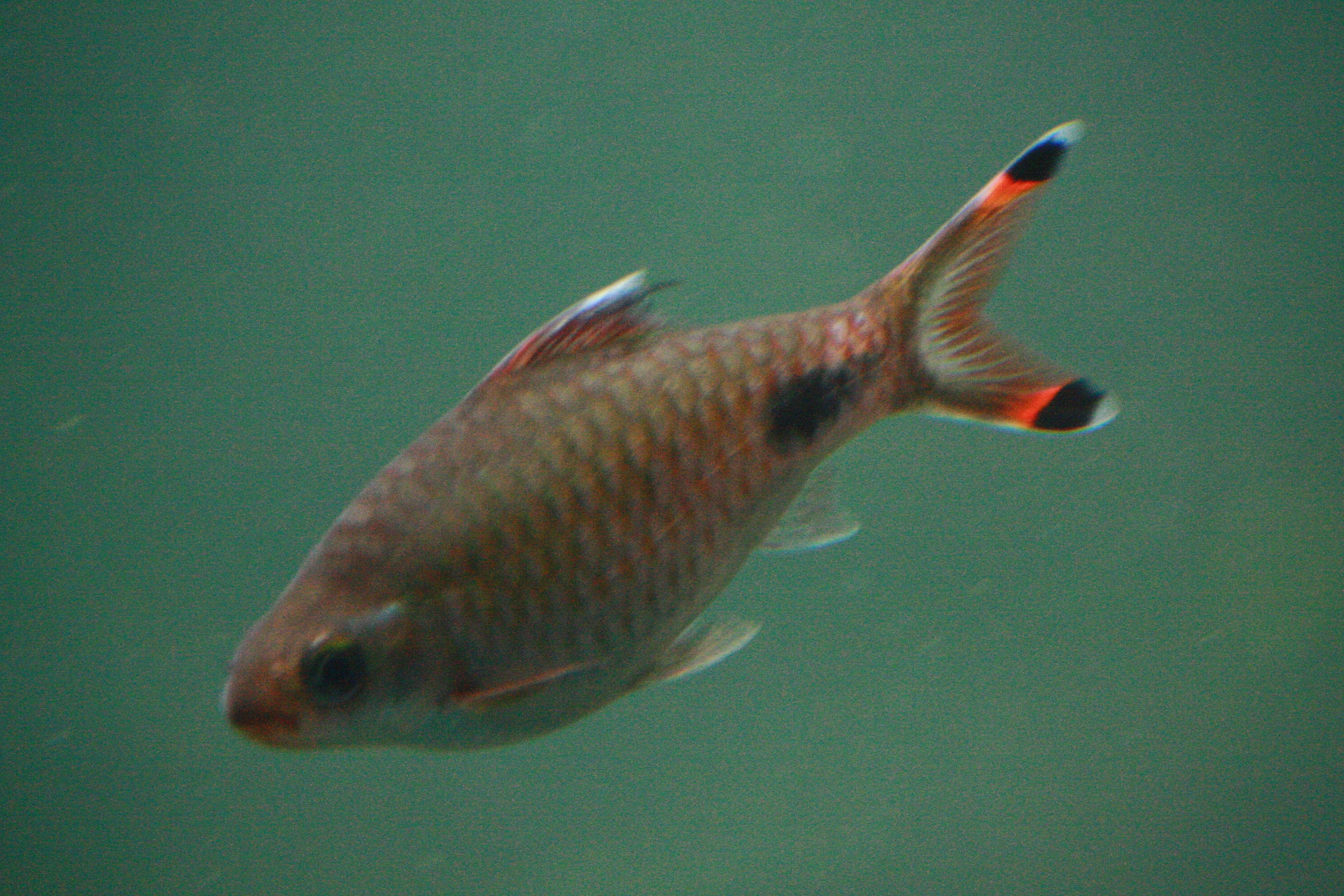

Conservation status
- Data Deficient (IUCN 3.1)

Scientific classification
- Kingdom: Animalia
- Phylum: Chordata
- Class: Actinopterygii
- Order: Cypriniformes
- Family: Cyprinidae
- Subfamily: Smiliogastrinae
- Genus: Puntius
- Species: P. mahecola

Binomial name
- Puntius mahecola (Valenciennes, 1844)

Synonyms
- Leuciscus mahecola Valenciennes, 1844

= Mahecola barb =

Species of fish

The Mahecola barb (Puntius mahecola) is a species of ray-finned fish in the family Cyprinidae. It is widely found in Kerala, India where it is known to breed in paddy fields during the monsoon season.
