= Puntius kamalika =

Conservation status
- Endangered (IUCN 3.1)

Scientific classification
- Kingdom: Animalia
- Phylum: Chordata
- Class: Actinopterygii
- Order: Cypriniformes
- Family: Cyprinidae
- Subfamily: Smiliogastrinae
- Genus: Puntius
- Species: P. kamalika

Binomial name
- Puntius kamalika Anjana Silva, Maduwage & Pethiyagoda, 2008

Species of fish

Puntius kamalika, Sri Lanka Kamalika's barb, is a species of cyprinid fish in the genus Puntius. It is found in Sri Lanka.

The fish is named in honor of Kamalika "Kami" Abeyaratne (1934–2004), a Sri Lankan pediatrician who became an AIDS activist after she contracted the disease HIV through a contaminated blood transfusion given to her following a near-fatal traffic accident.
