= Puntius thermalis =

Conservation status
- Least Concern (IUCN 3.1)

Scientific classification
- Kingdom: Animalia
- Phylum: Chordata
- Class: Actinopterygii
- Order: Cypriniformes
- Family: Cyprinidae
- Subfamily: Smiliogastrinae
- Genus: Puntius
- Species: P. thermalis

Binomial name
- Puntius thermalis (Valenciennes, 1844)

Synonyms
- Leuciscus thermalis Valenciennes, 1844; Barbus thermalis (Valenciennes, 1844)

Species of fish

Puntius thermalis is a species of ray-finned fish in the genus Puntius from Sri Lanka.
