= Travancore yellow barb =

Scientific classification
- Kingdom: Animalia
- Phylum: Chordata
- Class: Actinopterygii
- Order: Cypriniformes
- Family: Cyprinidae
- Subfamily: Smiliogastrinae
- Genus: Puntius
- Species: P. nelson

Binomial name
- Puntius nelson Plamoottil, 2014

Species of fish

The Travancore yellow barb (Puntius nelsoni) is a species of fish in the family Cyprinidae. The species was discovered in 2011, and was subsequently named and described by Mathews Plamoottil from the Baby John Memorial Government College, Chavara, Kollam, Kerala in 2014 in the International Journal of Fauna and Biological Studies. It was collected from the Kallumkala region of Manimala River in Kerala, India (Western Ghats). P. nelsoni is named after Nelson P. Abraham of St. Thomas College, Kozhencherry.

== Distribution ==
The Travancore yellow barb has so far only been recorded from the Manimala River which has its origin in Muthavara Hills of the Western Ghats, at 762m (2500 feet) above main sea level. It may also be possible to find the Travancore yellow barb in the Pamba River. The holotype was collected in Kallumkal of the Thiruvalla region, which is the confluence of the Manimala river and the Pamba River.

== Description ==
The holotype ZSI/WGRC/IR/23 and 3 paratypes ZSI/ WGRC/ IR/ 2354 were found in the Kallumkal region of Manimala River, near Thiruvalla, in the Pattanamthitta District on 21 August 2011. P. nelsoni can be distinguished from the rest of the species in its genus (Puntius) by the combination of uncommon characteristics such as the smaller snout, the short, feeble maxillaries which do not reach the orbit, nostrils placed halfway between the orbit and snout tip, the deeper head with a wider gape and the wide head. There are five and half scales between lateral line and the dorsal fin, and the lateral line has 25–26 scales with three and half scales between lateral line and ventral fin. The holotype had a total tail to snout length of 91 millimetres. In general, the body shows an elongated, laterally compressed form.

The body and fins of the Travencore yellow barb are yellow, as in the name. At the summit of occiput, there is a blue-green mark, and there are many fine black dots forming a thin band over the gills. The end of its caudal fin is dusky in color, and the back of its head is a greenish-yellow colour.

== Habitat ==
The Travencore yellow barb's habitat shows a substrate which is largely dominated by mud sediments with intermittent patches of bare sand among the mud.
