= Puntius khohi =

Conservation status
- Endangered (IUCN 3.1)

Scientific classification
- Kingdom: Animalia
- Phylum: Chordata
- Class: Actinopterygii
- Division: Teleostei
- Order: Cypriniformes
- Family: Cyprinidae
- Subfamily: Smiliogastrinae
- Genus: Puntius
- Species: P. khohi

Binomial name
- Puntius khohi Dobriyal, R. Singh, Uniyal, H. K. Joshi, Phurailatpam & Bisht, 2004

Species of fish

Puntius khohi is a species of fish in the family Cyprinidae in Puntius genus. The species was discovered in 2004, named and described by Dobriyal, R. Singh, Uniyal, H. K. Joshi, Phurailatpam & Bisht, of Gharwhal University in Uttaranchal, India in 2004. The study and paper on Puntius khohi was published in the Journal of the Inland Fish Society the same year (2004). It was collected from a stream called "Sil Gad" which originates from the western slopes of Kalondanda southeast of Lansdowne in the foothills of the Himalayas. The specific name khohi refers to the river in which the Sil Gad stream joins.

== Distribution ==
Puntius khohi is so far known only from Sil Gad stream it has its origin in the foothills of the Himalayas. There is a good chance of finding them in Khoh River as Sil Gad stream joins the Khoh river at Uttarakhand's Pauri district.

== Description ==
The holotype HNBGUCP/Zool - 2004A was found in the Sil Gad stream in the high altitude area of Uttharanchal, in India. Puntius khohi differs from the rest of the Puntius species by many features. Unique features of this fish are one black spot on the caudal peduncle close to the base of caudal fin, a little black spot is present behind the operculum, a black shade can be found behind the operculum, another black spot under the dorsal fin which extent to the base of caudal fin, compared to other species the body depth is less than the head length which is the reverse in other species, dorsal fin is located close to the snout than the base of caudal fin, lateral line is complete and is little concave in nature, and a light color band is found above to the lateral line paralleled.

=== Color ===
Live fish is colored silvery with black markings on the lateral line scales and the lateral line is complete and is little concave with 28 scales and a light band above the lateral line. black markings are present in caudal peduncle, operculum and dorsal fin is black in shade.

== Threats ==
The biodiversity of the river in which P. khohi is present is threatened by illegal fishing using poison.
