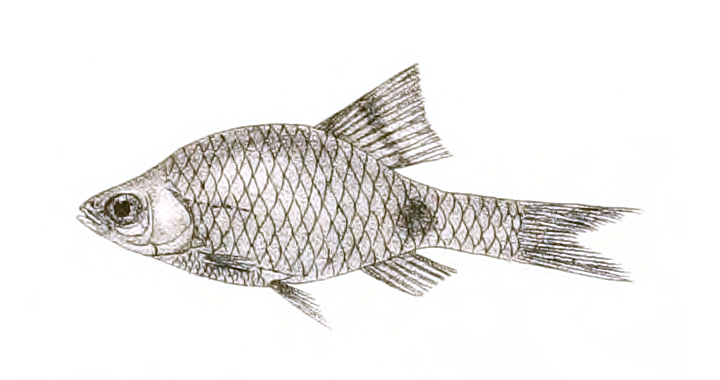

Conservation status
- Least Concern (IUCN 3.1)

Scientific classification
- Kingdom: Animalia
- Phylum: Chordata
- Class: Actinopterygii
- Order: Cypriniformes
- Family: Cyprinidae
- Subfamily: Smiliogastrinae
- Genus: Puntius
- Species: P. terio

Binomial name
- Puntius terio (F. Hamilton, 1822)

Synonyms
- Barbus terio Hamilton, 1822; Systomus terio Hamilton, 1822

= Onespot barb =

Species of fish

The onespot barb or Teri barb (Puntius terio) is a tropical freshwater fish belonging to the Cyprininae sub-family of the family Cyprinidae. It originates in inland waters in Asia, and is found in Pakistan, India, Bangladesh, Myanmar. It was originally described as Cyprinus terio by Dr. Francis Buchanan-Hamilton in 1822, and has also been referred to in scientific literature as Systomus terio or Barbus terio.

The fish will grow in length up to 4 in (10 cm). Males are yellowish all over, and the anal and ventral fins show shades of orange. At mating time, he becomes a bright orange color. The female is silver with clear fins. It is superficially similar to the rosy barb, Pethia conchonius, but it has a reddish-orange spot on the gill plate and a more pointed dorsal fin.

It natively inhabits rivers, canals, ponds, ditches, and inundated fields, over a silt and mud substrate. They live in a tropical climate in water with a 7.0 - 8.0 pH, a water hardness of 15 - 30 dGH, and a temperature range of 64 - 82 °F (18 - 28 °C).

The onespot barb is of commercial importance in the aquarium trade industry.

== See also ==
- List of freshwater aquarium fish species
