= Puntius snyderi =

Snyder's barb

Scientific classification
- Domain: Eukaryota
- Kingdom: Animalia
- Phylum: Chordata
- Class: Actinopterygii
- Order: Cypriniformes
- Family: Cyprinidae
- Genus: Puntius
- Species: P. snyderi

Binomial name
- Puntius snyderi Ōshima, 1919

Synonyms
- Barbodes snyderi (Ōshima, 1919)

Species of fish

Puntius snyderi (common name: Snyder's barb) is a species of cyprinid fish endemic to Taiwan. The specific name snyderi honors American ichthyologist John Otterbein Snyder.

Puntius snyderi grows to 9 cm (3.5 in) length. It is used as an aquarium fish.
