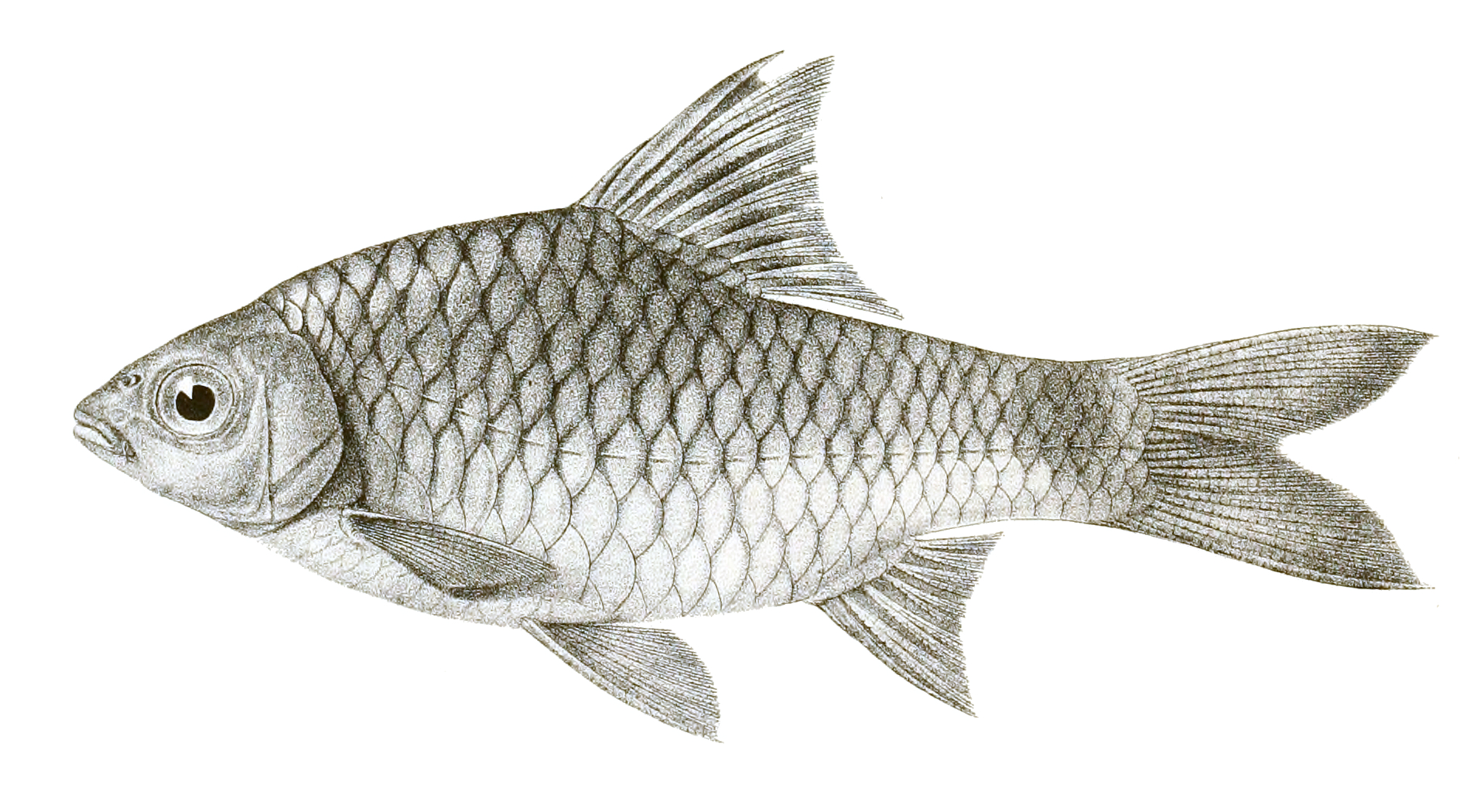

Conservation status
- Data Deficient (IUCN 3.1)

Scientific classification
- Domain: Eukaryota
- Kingdom: Animalia
- Phylum: Chordata
- Class: Actinopterygii
- Order: Cypriniformes
- Family: Cyprinidae
- Subfamily: Smiliogastrinae
- Genus: Puntius
- Species: P. burmanicus

Binomial name
- Puntius burmanicus (F. Day, 1878)

Synonyms
- Barbus burmanicus Day, 1878

= Puntius burmanicus =

Species of fish

Puntius burmanicus is a species of cyprinid fish endemic to Myanmar and only known from Mergui. It grows to 10 cm (3.9 in) TL.
