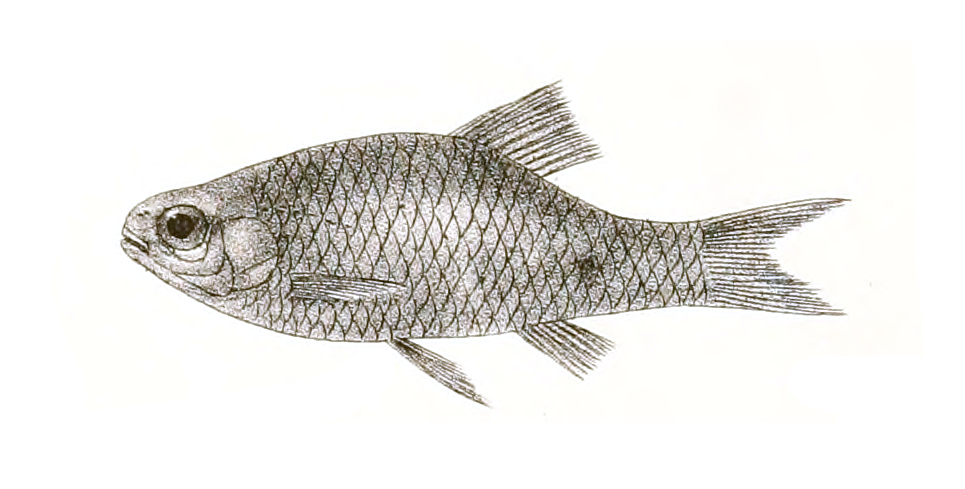

Scientific classification
- Kingdom: Animalia
- Phylum: Chordata
- Class: Actinopterygii
- Order: Cypriniformes
- Family: Cyprinidae
- Subfamily: Smiliogastrinae
- Genus: Puntius
- Species: P. waageni

Binomial name
- Puntius waageni (F. Day, 1872)

Synonyms
- Barbus waageni Day, 1872

= Puntius waageni =

Species of fish

Puntius waageni is a species of ray-finned fish in the genus Puntius. This species is endemic to Pakistan.

The fish is named in honor of the geologist and paleontologist Wilhelm Heinrich Waagen (1841–1900), who collected the type specimen.
