= Wilhelm Heinrich Waagen =

German geologist and paleontologist

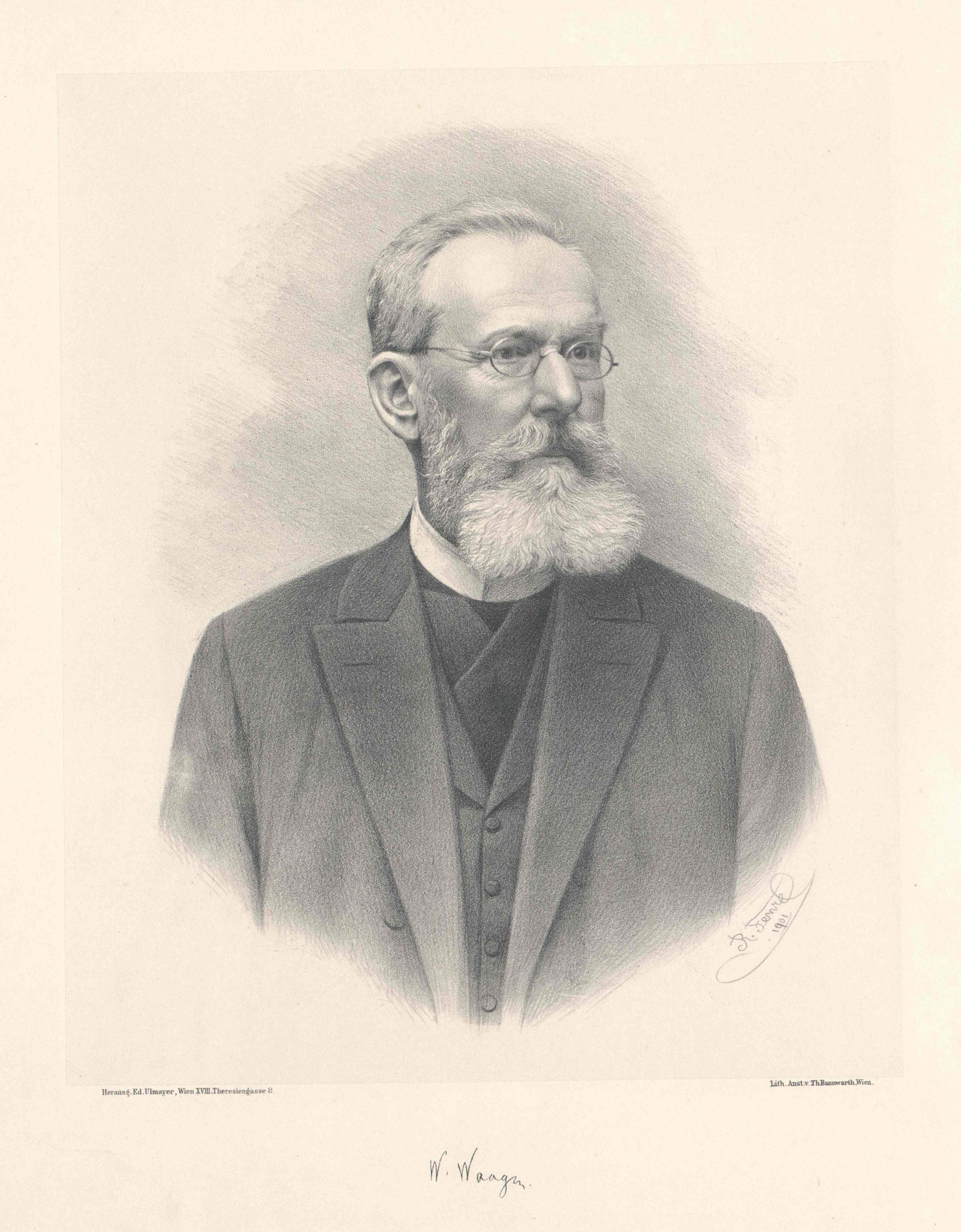
- Born: 23 June 1841; Munich
- Died: 24 March 1900 (aged 58); Vienna
- Occupations: Geologist, palaeontologist

Wilhelm Heinrich Waagen (23 June 1841 – 24 March 1900) was a German geologist and paleontologist. He was born in Munich and died in Vienna. He worked from 1870 to 1875 in the Geological Survey of India. He was a professor of paleontology at the University of Vienna from 1890.

== Life and work ==
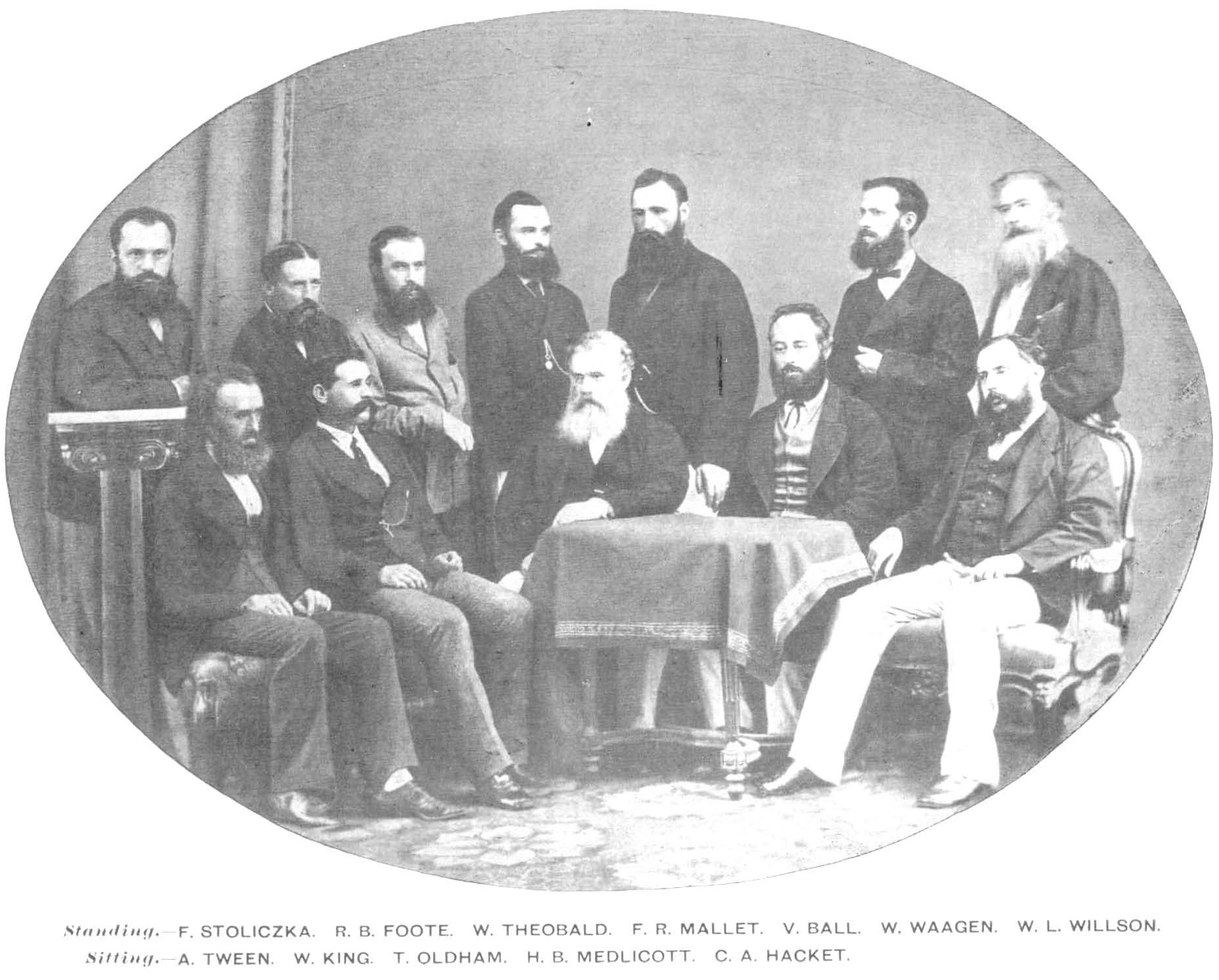
Geological Survey of India in 1870; Waagen is the second standing figure from the right.

Waagen was born in Munich, the son of a Prussian councillor and his wife, Nanette (née Schechner), who had been a singer. He studied locally and attended the lectures of Karl Theodor Ernst von Siebold and Albert Oppel at the Ludwig-Maximilians-Universität München before going to the University of Zurich where he studied natural sciences. His first work was on the Jurassic of France, Swabia and Switzerland published in 1864.

He received a Doctor of Philosophy degree at the Ludwig-Maximilians-Universität München under Albert Oppel where he studied the rocks and fossils of the Jurassic system, and published an elaborate work on geology (Versuch einer Allgemeinen Classification der Schichten des oberen Jura) that was crowned by the university. In 1866, he became an instructor in paleontology at the Ludwig-Maximilians-Universität München and at the same time taught Princess Theresa and Prince Arnulf of Bavaria. In 1886, he declined a position at the school of mines at Berlin. In 1870, he joined the Geological Survey of India and was appointed as a paleontologist in 1874, but the weather forced him to retire in 1875. He married Sophie, Baroness von Gross-schedel and moved to Vienna where he served as a tutor.

In 1877, he became an instructor at the University of Vienna where he lectured on the geology of India. In 1879, Waagen went to the German Polytechnic of Prague as professor of geology and mineralogy, and in 1890, following the death of Melchior Neumayr, he became professor of paleontology at the University of Vienna. He held this position until his death. He edited the Silurian System of Bohemia begun by Joachim Barrande along with Dr. J. Jahn in 1899, contributing to the section on crinoids. Waagen's main work in British India was on the Jurassic cephalopods of Kutch and on the Salt Range fossils, both forming parts of the “Paleontologica Indica” and the latter was incomplete at the time of his death.

Waagen was named councillor of the board of mines (Oberbergart), and in 1893 was made a corresponding member of the Academy of Sciences. In 1898, the Geological Society of London awarded him the Lyell medal.

Waagen's writings before his trip to British India treat especially the German Jura and its fossils. He was a pioneer in the geological investigation of British India (the Salt Range, presently in Pakistan) by the scientific presentation of rich palaeontological material. He established a refined lithostratigraphy of the Early Triassic series (Mianwali Formation) that still holds today. This allows to replace most of the ammonoids he described in their original stratigraphic position, an accomplishment rarely achieved by paleontologists in the late 19th century. He first realized how important the Early Triassic ammonoid succession of the Salt Range was for the construction of the Triassic timescale.

In 1869, after an exhaustive study of ammonites, Waagen advocated the theory of orthogenetic evolution or mutation for certain series of fossils. As a young man he had taken an active part in the Catholic life of Munich, and two years before his death he wrote a treatise on the first chapter of Genesis that showed both the geologist and the Christian. His son, Lukas Waagen, was also a geologist.

== Legacy ==
The fossil conodont Neospathodus waageni was named after him, but it is now placed under the genus Novispathodus. The fish Puntius waageni is named for Waagen, as it was described on the basis of a specimen that he collected.

== Editorial works ==
Waagen was one of the editors of the periodical "Geognostische-paläontologische Beiträge" (Munich), and during the years 1894-1900 editor of the "Beiträge zur Paläontologie Oesterreich-Ungarns und des Orients" (Vienna); after the death of Joachim Barrande (1883) he edited several volumes of Barrande's work "Système silurien". Waagen's most important works were:

- "Der Jura in Franken, Schwaben und der Schweiz" (Munich, 1864).
- "Klassification der Schichten des obern Jura" (Munich, 1865).
- "Über die Zone des Ammonites Sowerbyi" (Munich, 1867)
- "Die Formenreihe des Ammonites subradiatus" (Munich, 1869).
- "Ueber die geologische Verteilung der Organismen in Indien" (Vienna, 1878).
- "Das Schopfungsproblem" in "Natur und Offenbarung" (Munster, 1898; as a separate publication, 1899).
- "Gliederun der pelagischen Sedimente des Triassystems" (Vienna, 1895).

He wrote in English: "Jurassic Fauna of Kutch" (1873-6); "Productus Limestone" (1879–91); "Fossils from the Ceratite Formation" (1892).
