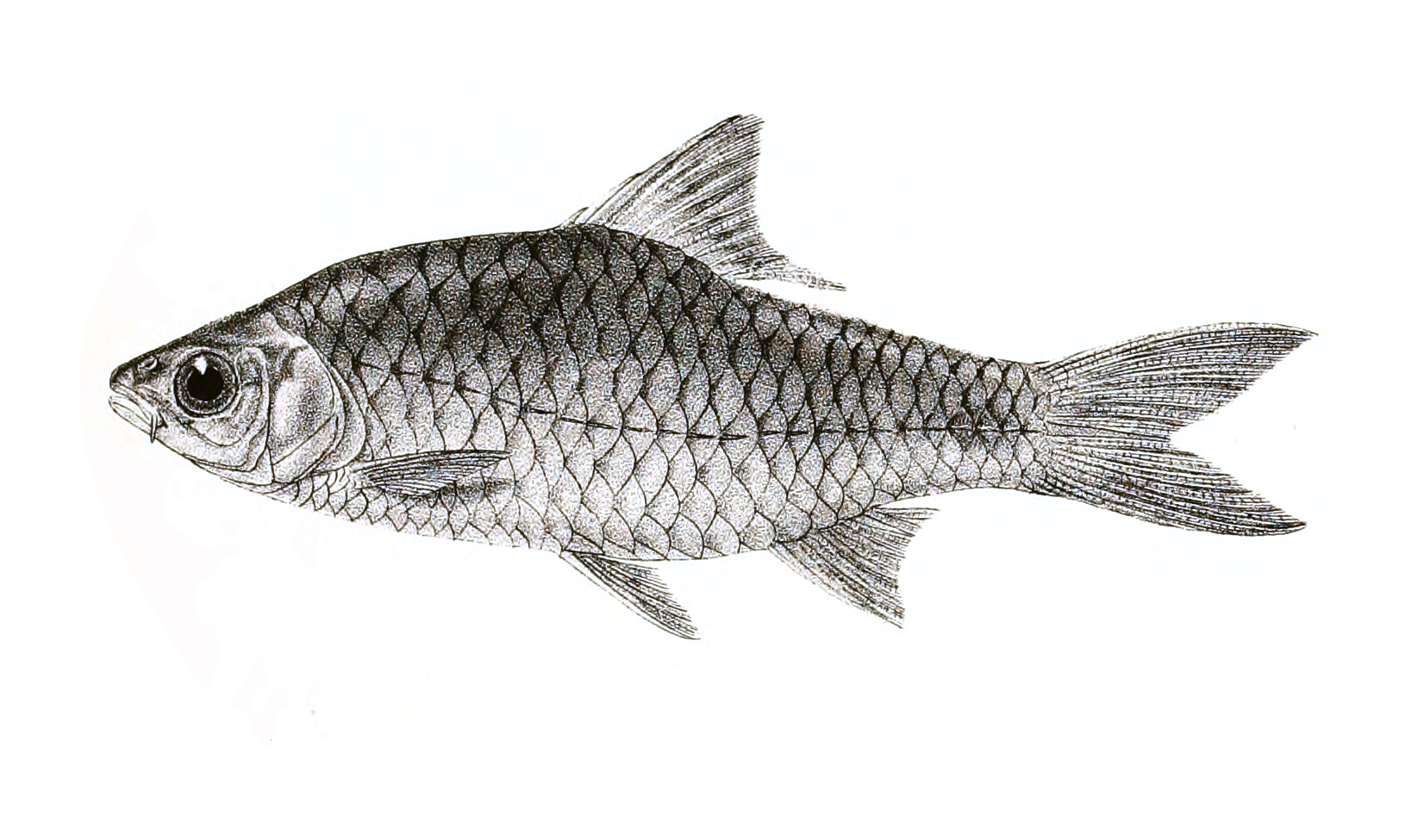

Conservation status
- Least Concern (IUCN 3.1)

Scientific classification
- Kingdom: Animalia
- Phylum: Chordata
- Class: Actinopterygii
- Order: Cypriniformes
- Family: Cyprinidae
- Subfamily: Smiliogastrinae
- Genus: Puntius
- Species: P. parrah

Binomial name
- Puntius parrah F. Day, 1865

= Parrah barb =

Species of fish

The Parrah barb (Puntius parrah) is a species of ray-finned fish in the genus Puntius. It is found in Kerala, Karnataka and Tamil Nadu in India.
