= Puntius masyai =

Scientific classification
- Kingdom: Animalia
- Phylum: Chordata
- Class: Actinopterygii
- Order: Cypriniformes
- Family: Cyprinidae
- Subfamily: Smiliogastrinae
- Genus: Puntius
- Species: P. masyai

Binomial name
- Puntius masyai H. M. Smith, 1945

Species of fish

Puntius masyai is a species of ray-finned fish in the genus Puntius. It is found in Mekong Basin.
