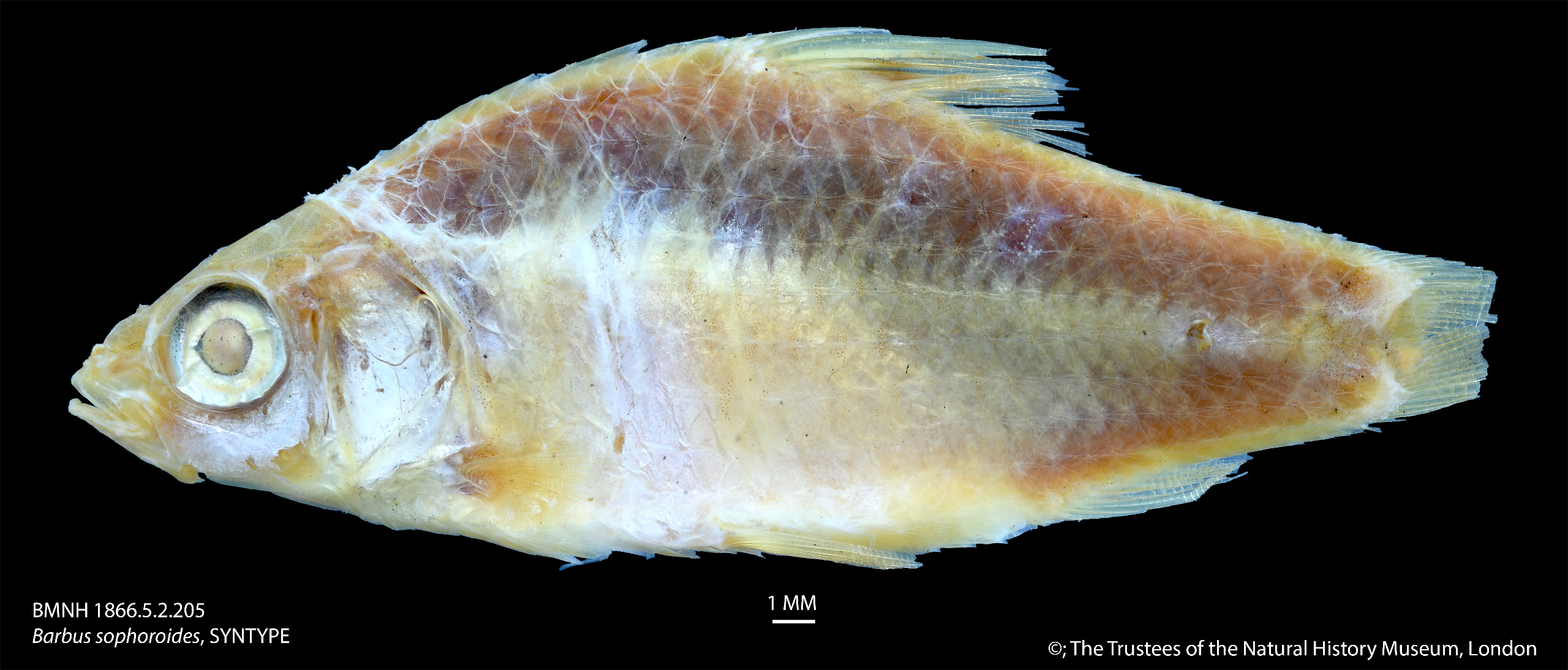

Scientific classification
- Domain: Eukaryota
- Kingdom: Animalia
- Phylum: Chordata
- Class: Actinopterygii
- Order: Cypriniformes
- Family: Cyprinidae
- Subfamily: Smiliogastrinae
- Genus: Puntius
- Species: P. sophoroides

Binomial name
- Puntius sophoroides (Günther, 1868)

Synonyms
- Barbus sophoroides Günther, 1868

= Puntius sophoroides =

Species of fish

Puntius sophoroides is a species of ray-finned fish in the genus Puntius. It is found in India.
