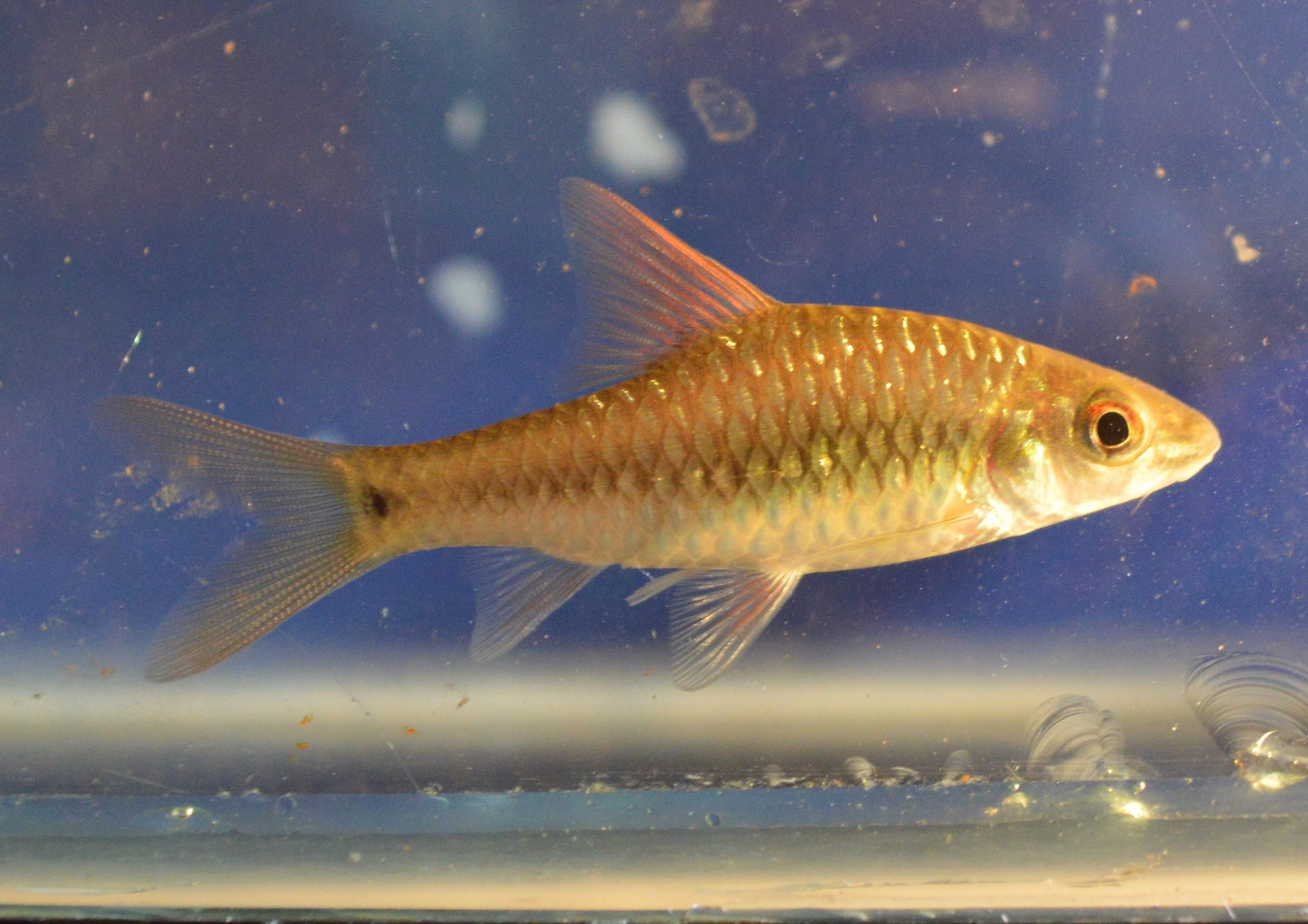

Conservation status
- Endangered (IUCN 3.1)

Scientific classification
- Kingdom: Animalia
- Phylum: Chordata
- Class: Actinopterygii
- Order: Cypriniformes
- Family: Cyprinidae
- Subfamily: Smiliogastrinae
- Genus: Puntius
- Species: P. kelumi

Binomial name
- Puntius kelumi Pethiyagoda, Anjana Silva, Maduwage & Meegaskumbura, 2008

= Puntius kelumi =

Species of fish

Puntius kelumi, Kelums long snouted barb, is a species of cyprinid fish in the genus Puntius. It is found in Sri Lanka.

The fish is named in honor or Sri Lankan naturalist Kelum Manamendra-Arachchi.

== Description ==
Identified by other Puntius species by last unbranched dorsal-fin ray becomes smooth. rostral barbels absent, but maxillary barbels present. There are 20-23 lateral-line scales.
