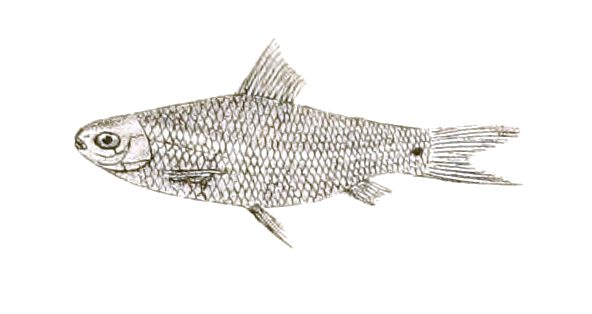

Conservation status
- Least Concern (IUCN 3.1)

Scientific classification
- Kingdom: Animalia
- Phylum: Chordata
- Class: Actinopterygii
- Order: Cypriniformes
- Family: Cyprinidae
- Subfamily: Smiliogastrinae
- Genus: Puntius
- Species: P. punjabensis

Binomial name
- Puntius punjabensis (F. Day, 1871)

Synonyms
- Barbus punjabensis Day, 1871

= Puntius punjabensis =

Species of fish

Puntius punjabensis is a species of ray-finned fish in the genus Puntius. This species is endemic to Pakistan.
