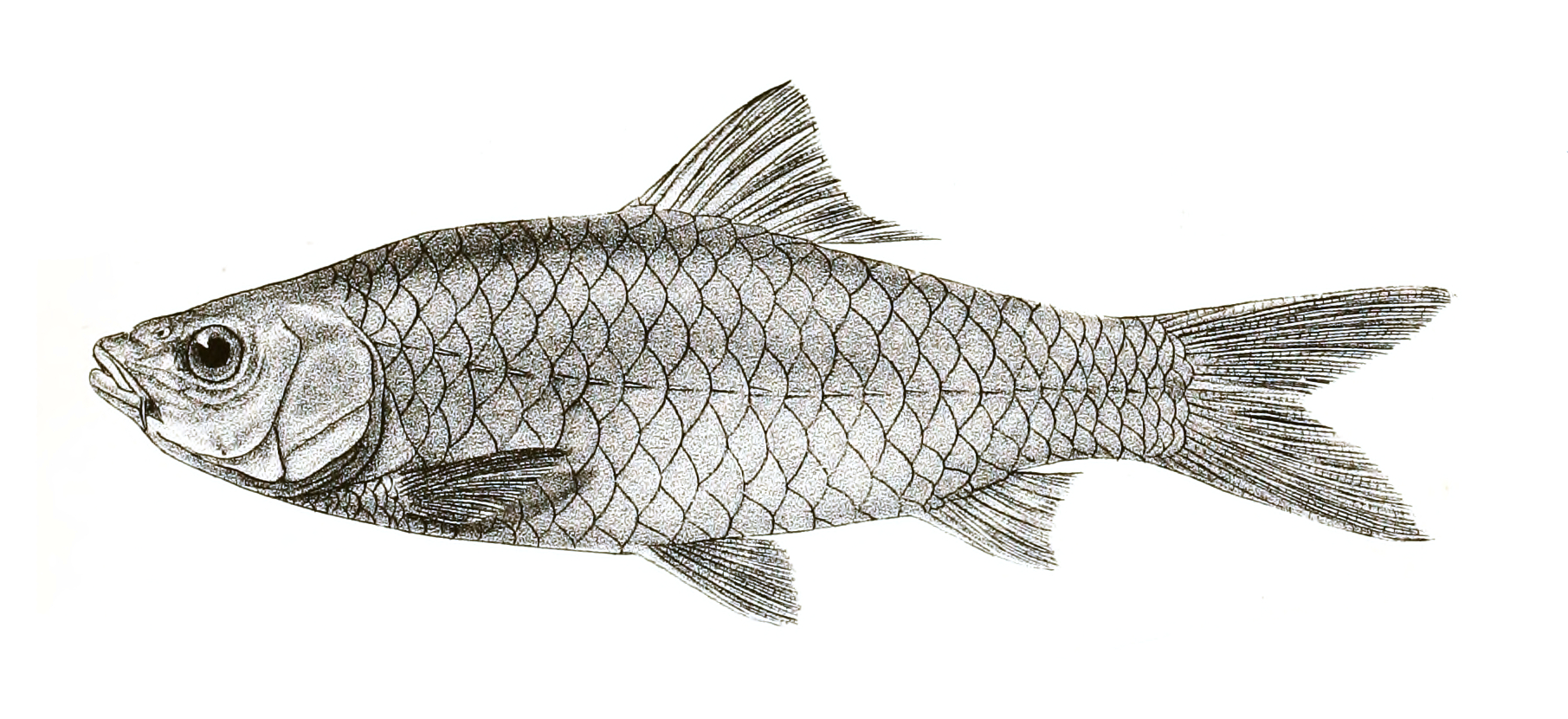

Conservation status
- Vulnerable (IUCN 3.1)

Scientific classification
- Kingdom: Animalia
- Phylum: Chordata
- Class: Actinopterygii
- Order: Cypriniformes
- Family: Cyprinidae
- Subfamily: Smiliogastrinae
- Genus: Puntius
- Species: P. arenatus

Binomial name
- Puntius arenatus (F. Day, 1878)

Synonyms
- Barbus arenatus Day, 1878

= Arenatus barb =

Species of fish

The Arenatus barb (Puntius arenatus) is a species of ray-finned fish in the genus Puntius from India.
