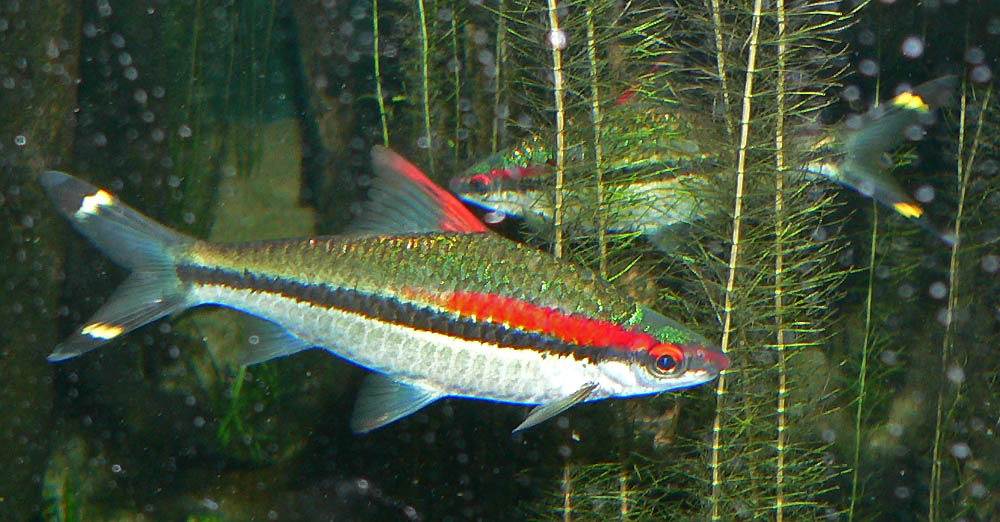
- Denison barb (S. denisonii)

Scientific classification
- Kingdom: Animalia
- Phylum: Chordata
- Class: Actinopterygii
- Order: Cypriniformes
- Family: Cyprinidae
- Subfamily: Barbinae
- Genus: Sahyadria; Raghavan, Philip, Ali & Dahanukar, 2013

Type species
- Labeo denisonii F. Day, 1865

= Sahyadria =

Genus of fishes

Sahyadria is a genus of cyprinid fishes native to India where they are endemic to rivers and streams in the Western Ghats. They were formerly included in Puntius. The largest Sahyadria measure 15 cm (5.9 in) total length.

== Etymology ==
The name of this genus is derived from the word "Sahyadri", a local name for the Western Ghats.

== Species ==
There are currently two recognized species in this genus:

- Sahyadria chalakkudiensis (Menon, Rema Devi & Thobias, 1999)
- Sahyadria denisonii (F. Day, 1865) – Denison barb; red line torpedo barb
