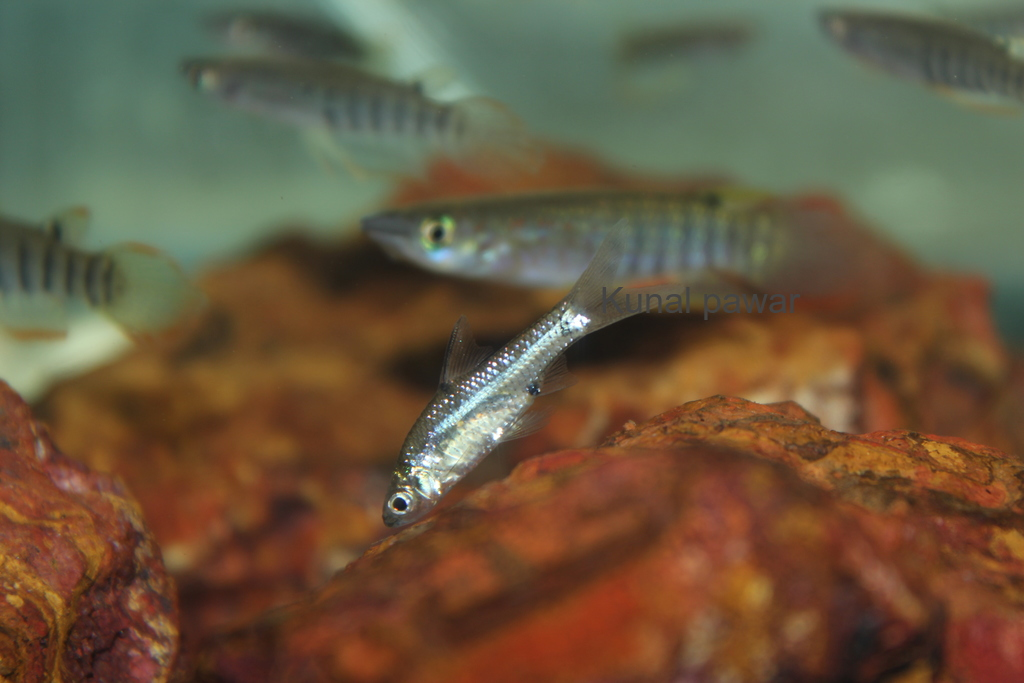

Conservation status
- Endangered (IUCN 3.1)

Scientific classification
- Kingdom: Animalia
- Phylum: Chordata
- Class: Actinopterygii
- Order: Cypriniformes
- Family: Cyprinidae
- Subfamily: Smiliogastrinae
- Genus: Puntius
- Species: P. fraseri

Binomial name
- Puntius fraseri (Hora & Misra, 1938)

Synonyms
- Barbus fraseri Hora & Misra, 1938

= Dharna barb =

Species of fish

The Dharna barb (Puntius fraseri) is a species of ray-finned fish in the genus Puntius. It is endemic to India.

The fish is named in honor of amateur herpetologist Albert Glen Leslie Fraser (1887-?), who collected the type specimen and supplied the authors with Bhil names of Deolali (India) fishes.
