= Redtail barb =

Conservation status
- Vulnerable (IUCN 3.1)

Scientific classification
- Kingdom: Animalia
- Phylum: Chordata
- Class: Actinopterygii
- Order: Cypriniformes
- Family: Cyprinidae
- Subfamily: Smiliogastrinae
- Genus: Enteromius
- Species: E. gurneyi

Binomial name
- Enteromius gurneyi (Günther, 1868)

Synonyms
- Barbus gurneyi Günther, 1868

Species of fish

The redtail barb (Enteromius gurneyi) is a species of cyprinid fish endemic to KwaZulu Natal in South Africa. It is found at altitudes of 300–1,000 metres (980–3,280 ft), particularly in clear streams over sandstones.

== Size ==
This species reaches a length of 10.0 cm (3.9 in).

== Etymology ==
The fish is named in honor of John Henry Gurney (1819–1890), an English banker and amateur ornithologist, through whose help Günther received numerous specimens from Port Natal Durban, South Africa.
