= Deccan barb =

Conservation status
- Critically endangered, possibly extinct (IUCN 3.1)

Scientific classification
- Kingdom: Animalia
- Phylum: Chordata
- Class: Actinopterygii
- Order: Cypriniformes
- Family: Cyprinidae
- Subfamily: Smiliogastrinae
- Genus: Puntius
- Species: P. deccanensis

Binomial name
- Puntius deccanensis Yazdani & Babu Rao, 1976

Species of fish

Puntius deccanensis, the Deccan barb, is a critically endangered species of ray-finned fish in the genus Puntius. It is endemic to the Northern Western Ghats in India.
