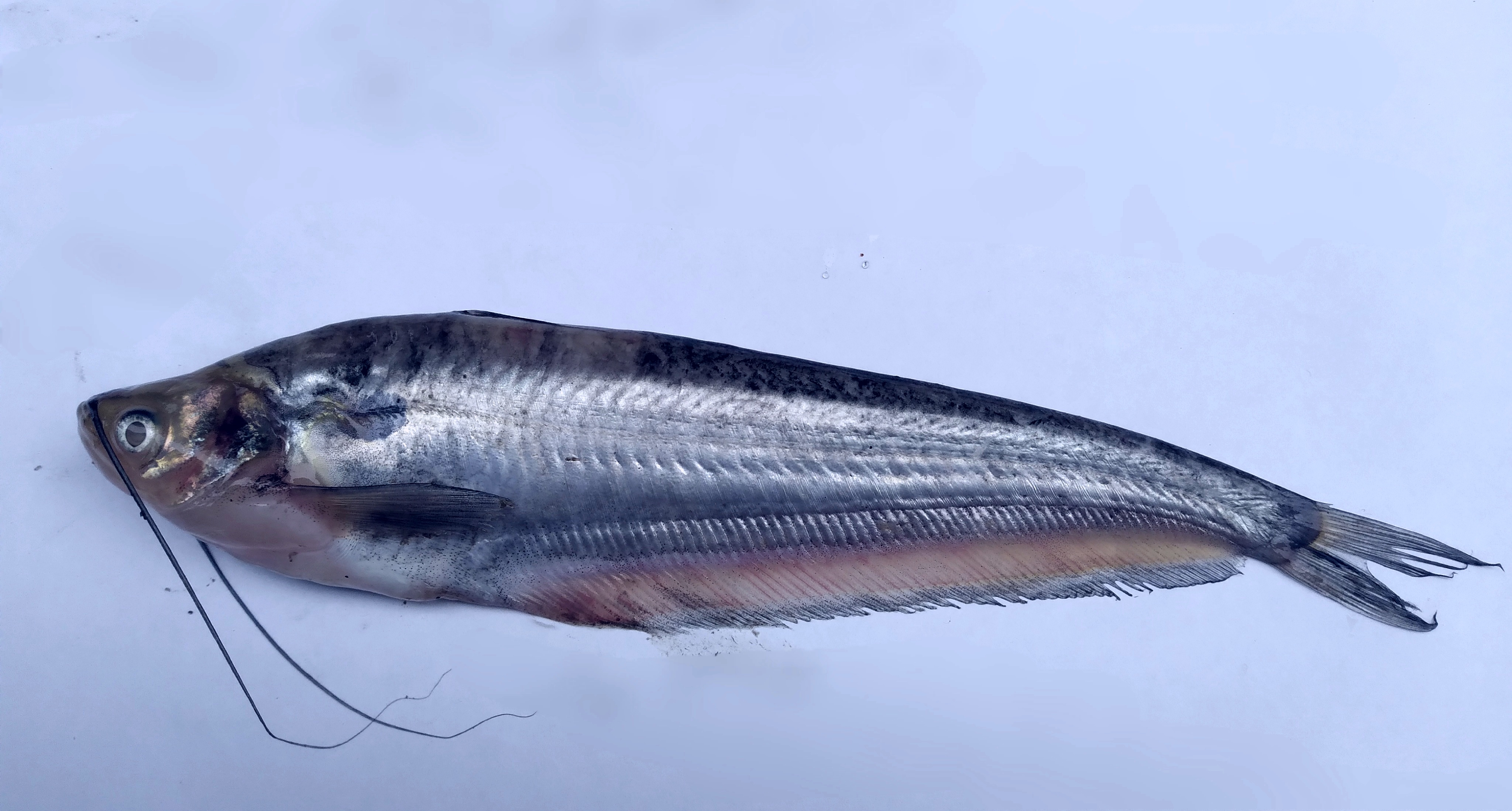

Conservation status
- Near Threatened (IUCN 3.1)

Scientific classification
- Kingdom: Animalia
- Phylum: Chordata
- Class: Actinopterygii
- Order: Siluriformes
- Family: Siluridae
- Genus: Ompok
- Species: O. pabo

Binomial name
- Ompok pabo (F. Hamilton, 1822)

= Ompok pabo =

Species of fish

Ompok pabo or Pabo catfish (Assamese: পাভ মাছ, Bengali: পাবদা মাছ) is a freshwater fish from the family Siluridae (Sheatfishes) native to Pakistan, North-East India, Bangladesh and Myanmar. It is found in rivers, ponds and lakes. It can grow up to the length of 25 cm.
