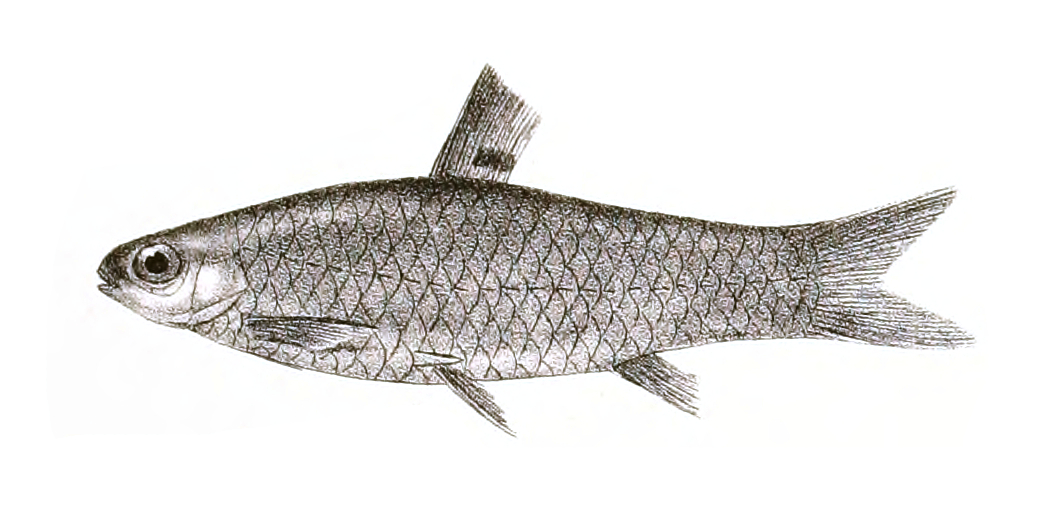

Conservation status
- Least Concern (IUCN 3.1)

Scientific classification
- Domain: Eukaryota
- Kingdom: Animalia
- Phylum: Chordata
- Class: Actinopterygii
- Order: Cypriniformes
- Family: Cyprinidae
- Subfamily: Smiliogastrinae
- Genus: Puntius
- Species: P. dorsalis

Binomial name
- Puntius dorsalis (Jerdon, 1849)

Synonyms
- Systomus dorsalis Jerdon, 1849; Barbus dorsalis (Jerdon, 1849); Systomus tristis Jerdon, 1849

= Long-snouted barb =

Species of fish

The long-snouted barb (Puntius dorsalis) is a species of ray-finned fish in the genus Puntius. It is found in India and Sri Lanka.
