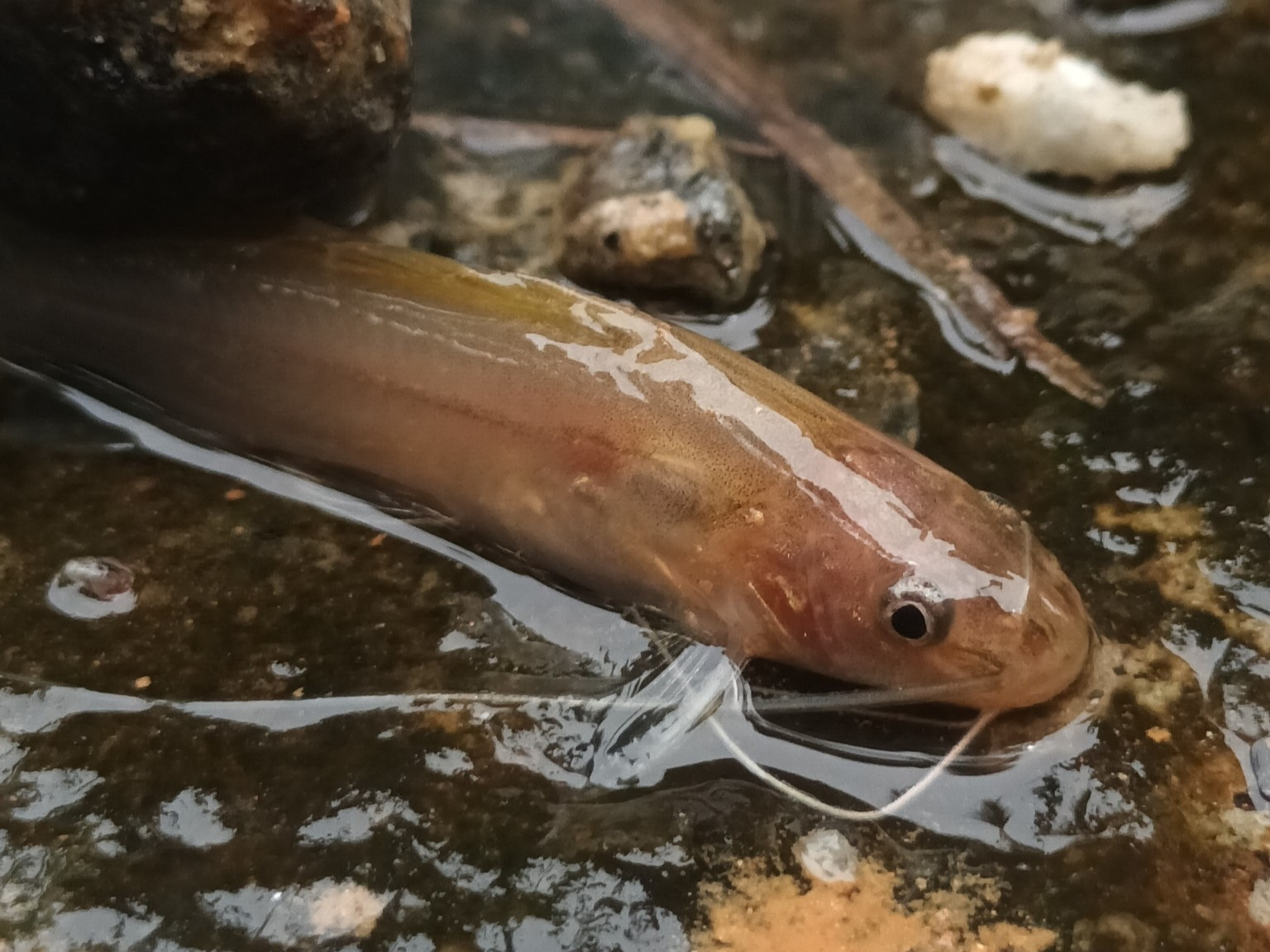

Conservation status
- Near Threatened (IUCN 3.1)

Scientific classification
- Kingdom: Animalia
- Phylum: Chordata
- Class: Actinopterygii
- Order: Siluriformes
- Family: Bagridae
- Genus: Mystus
- Species: M. malabaricus

Binomial name
- Mystus malabaricus (Jerdon, 1849)

Synonyms
- Bagrus malabaricus Jerdon, 1849; Hara malabarica (Jerdon, 1849); Macrones malabaricus (Jerdon, 1849)

= Mystus malabaricus =

Species of fish

Mystus malabaricus, commonly known as the Jerdon's catfish or koori, is a small to medium-sized freshwater fish of the family Bagridae found in the Western Ghats region of India. They are found in the hilly streams of Kerala, Karnataka, Tamil Nadu and Maharashtra.

== Etymology ==
The generic epithet, Mystus, is probably derived from mystax (Greek; "whiskered", referring to the four pairs of barbels characteristic of the family). The specific epithet malabaricus refers to Malabar, region in southern India, where the type locality is situated.

== Ecology ==
Members of this genus have been reported as facultative air-breathers. M. malabaricus is amphidromous, meaning they migrate to brackish waters for purposes other than breeding. They have demersal habit, found in shallow hill streams with rocky bottom.

== Description and diagnosis ==
Males reach a maximum total length of 15 centimetres (5.9 in), according to fishbase.

Nasal barbels never reach occiput, it reaches a middle point between occiput and orbit; outer mandibulars reach to tip of pectorals; occipital process connected to dorsal front by an interneural shield; tip of rayed dorsal reaches to base of adipose dorsal front; any other fins touch each other; dorsal spine smooth both internally and externally; anal fin inserted considerably behind anal opening; upper caudal lobe longer than lower one. Sensory organs distinctly seen on lateral line. Color: body greenish; eyes blackish blue.

=== Diagnosis ===
Body elongate; dorsal and ventral profiles nearly straight; maxillary barbels reach to middle or end of pelvic fins; cephalic fontanel single, shallow and never reach to occiput; occipital process short and it do not reach dorsal front; the former cannot be seen externally as predorsal region is covered by a thick layer of flesh; caudal lobes rounded.

Other species from the region include (list incomplete) -

- Mystus montanus (Jerdon, 1849); TL - Mananthawady, Wayanad
- Mystus armatus (Day 1895); TL - 'Cochin Malabar'- Trichur
- Mystus oculatus (Valenciennes 1840); TL - Kuttiady, Malabar
- Mystus sengtee (Sykes 1839) TL- Dukhun, India

== Distribution ==
M. malabaricus has been reported from the Western Ghats across Kerala, Karnataka, Tamil Nadu and Maharashtra. The type locality is assigned as "mountain streams of Malabar" by Jerdon
