= Parapsilorhynchus tentaculatus =

Scientific classification
- Domain: Eukaryota
- Kingdom: Animalia
- Phylum: Chordata
- Class: Actinopterygii
- Order: Cypriniformes
- Family: Cyprinidae
- Genus: Parapsilorhynchus
- Species: P. tentaculatus

Binomial name
- Parapsilorhynchus tentaculatus (Annandale, 1919)

Synonyms
- Psilorhynchus tentaculatus Annandale, 1919

Species of fish

Parapsilorhynchus tentaculatus, commonly known as the Khandalla minnow, is indigenous to India. This species reaches a length of 4.5 cm (1.8 in).
