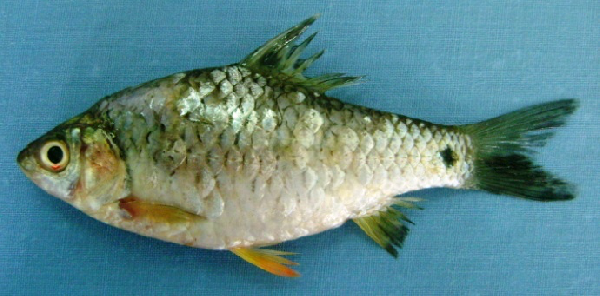

Conservation status
- Least Concern (IUCN 3.1)

Scientific classification
- Kingdom: Animalia
- Phylum: Chordata
- Class: Actinopterygii
- Order: Cypriniformes
- Family: Cyprinidae
- Subfamily: Smiliogastrinae
- Genus: Puntius
- Species: P. sophore

Binomial name
- Puntius sophore (F. Hamilton, 1822)

Synonyms
- Systomus sophore (F. Hamilton, 1822); Cyprinus sophore (F. Hamilton, 1822); Barbus sophore (F. Hamilton, 1822)

= Pool barb =

Species of fish

The pool barb, spotfin swamp barb, or stigma barb (Puntius sophore) is a tropical freshwater and brackish fish belonging to the Puntius genus in the family Cyprinidae. It is native to inland waters in Asia and is found in India, Nepal, Bangladesh, Myanmar, Bhutan, Afghanistan, Pakistan and Yunnan, China.

== Description ==
It reaches an adult size of 18 cm. (7 in) and a weight of 70 grams (2.5 ounces). The first maturity of female occurs at 4.7 cm. At the population level, size at 50% maturity (LM50) is 8.6-9.0 cm.

== Habitat ==
Its native habitat is rivers, streams, and ponds in plains and submontane regions. It is a plentiful shoaling fish.

== Breeding ==
Pool barbs naturally breed within a temperature range 20–30 °C and >50 mm rainfall. The threshold gonadosomatic index (GSI) for breeding is 10.5 units in females. Females also need to attain a body fitness (Fulton's condition factor) of at least 1.6-1.7 units for successful spawning decision.

== Synonyms ==
This fish was originally named Cyprinus sophore by Francis Buchanan-Hamilton in 1822, and is also referred to as Systomus sophore, and Barbus sophore.

== See also ==
- List of freshwater aquarium fish species
