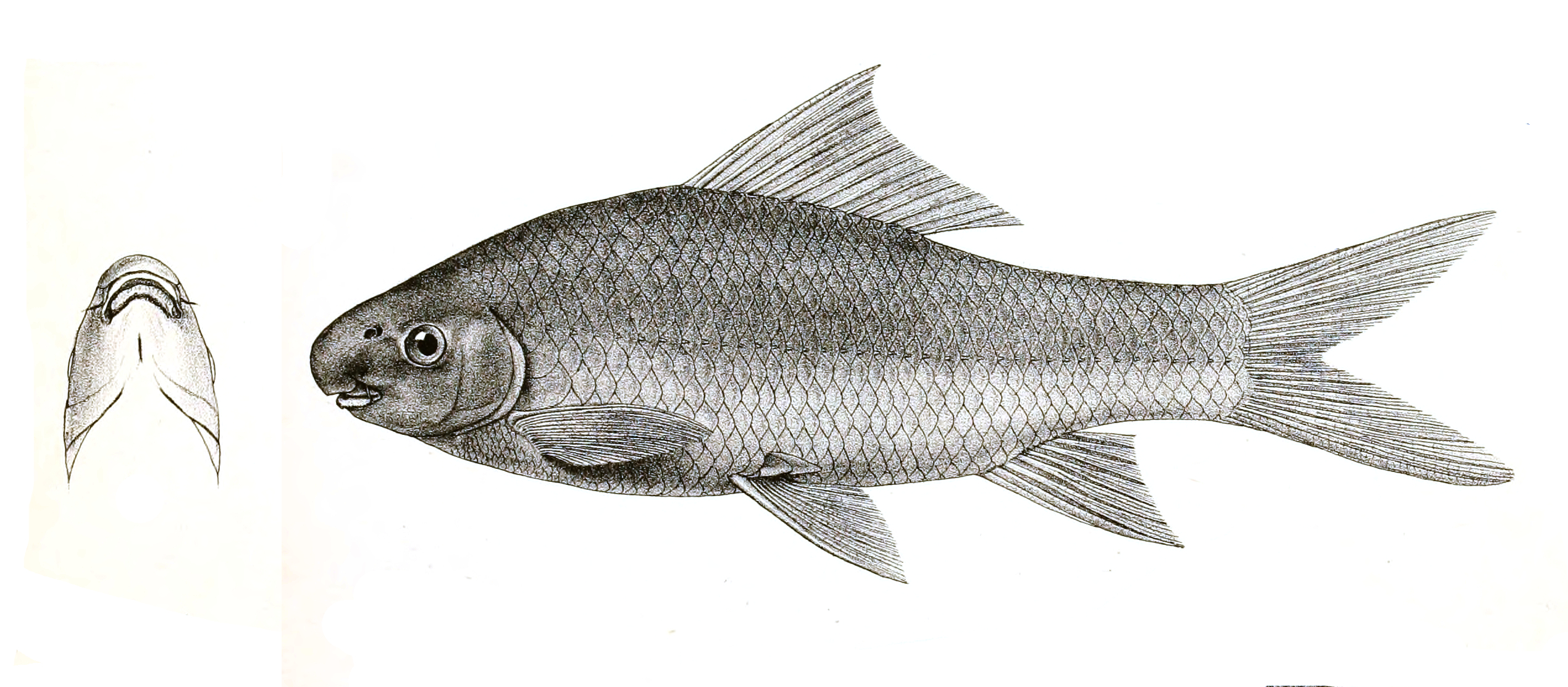

Conservation status
- Endangered (IUCN 3.1)

Scientific classification
- Domain: Eukaryota
- Kingdom: Animalia
- Phylum: Chordata
- Class: Actinopterygii
- Order: Cypriniformes
- Family: Cyprinidae
- Subfamily: Labeoninae
- Genus: Labeo
- Species: L. potail

Binomial name
- Labeo potail (Sykes, 1839)

Synonyms
- Cyprinus potail Sykes, 1839; Leuciscus potail (Sykes, 1839)

= Labeo potail =

Species of fish

Labeo potail is a species of fish in the genus Labeo from the Western Ghats in Karnataka, Kerala and Maharashtra.
