= Nemacheilus anguilla =

Conservation status
- Least Concern (IUCN 3.1)

Scientific classification
- Kingdom: Animalia
- Phylum: Chordata
- Class: Actinopterygii
- Order: Cypriniformes
- Family: Nemacheilidae
- Genus: Nemacheilus
- Species: N. anguilla

Binomial name
- Nemacheilus anguilla Annandale, 1919

Synonyms
- Noemacheilus anguilla (Annandale, 1919); Nemacheilus poonaensis Menon, 1950

Species of fish

Nemacheilus anguilla, the eel loach, is a species of ray-finned fish in the genus Nemacheilus which is endemic to the Western Ghats in southern India. It occurs in streams with pebbles and with sandy substrates. It is collected for the aquarium trade but the main threat may come from pollution caused by large numbers of pilgrims which attend temples near the waters in which this species occurs.

== Footnotes ==
- Froese, Rainer; Pauly, Daniel (eds.). "Nemacheilus anguilla". FishBase.
