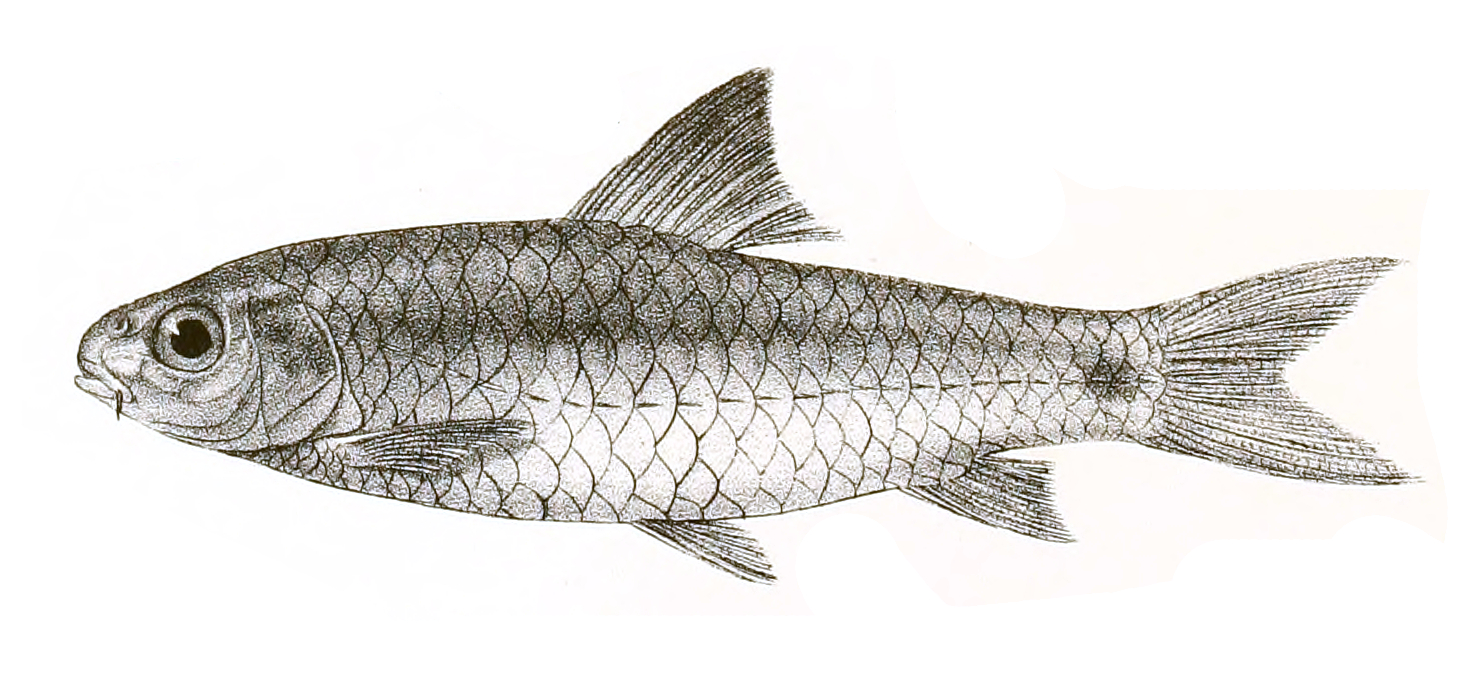

Conservation status
- Data Deficient (IUCN 3.1)

Scientific classification
- Kingdom: Animalia
- Phylum: Chordata
- Class: Actinopterygii
- Order: Cypriniformes
- Family: Cyprinidae
- Subfamily: Smiliogastrinae
- Genus: Puntius
- Species: P. amphibius

Binomial name
- Puntius amphibius (Valenciennes, 1842)

Synonyms
- Capoeta amphibia Valenciennes, 1842; Barbus amphibius (Valenciennes, 1842); Systomus amphibius (Valenciennes, 1842)

= Scarlet-banded barb =

Species of fish

The scarlet-banded barb (Puntius amphibius) is a species of ray-finned fish in the genus Puntius. It is found in streams in India and Sri Lanka. It can reach a length of 20 cm (7.9 in).
