= Barb (fish) =

Group of fishes

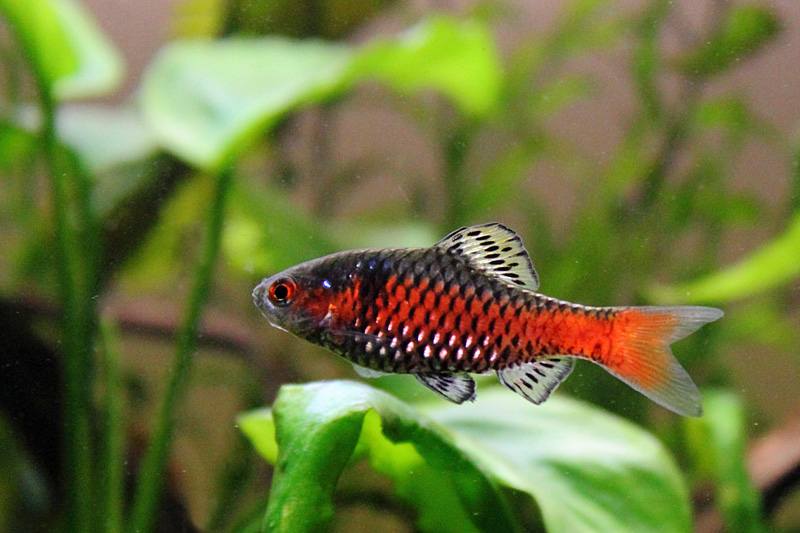
A typical barb (Odessa barb, Pethia padamya)

A barb is one of various ray-finned fish species in a non-phylogenetic group, with members in the family Cyprinidae, and especially the genera Barbus and Puntius, but many others also. They were formerly united with the barbels in the subfamily Barbinae but that group is paraphyletic with the Cyprininae. If the Labeoninae are recognized as distinct, many small African "barbs" would probably, however, warrant recognition as a new subfamily.

The root of the word "barb" is common in cyprinid names of European languages, from the Latin barba ("beard") (COD):

- barb from Catalan
- barbi from Finnish
- barbo from Spanish
- barbeau from French
- barbo from Italian
- barbe from German

and many others. This is in reference to the barbels which are prominently seen around the mouth of many "barbs".

== Genera ==
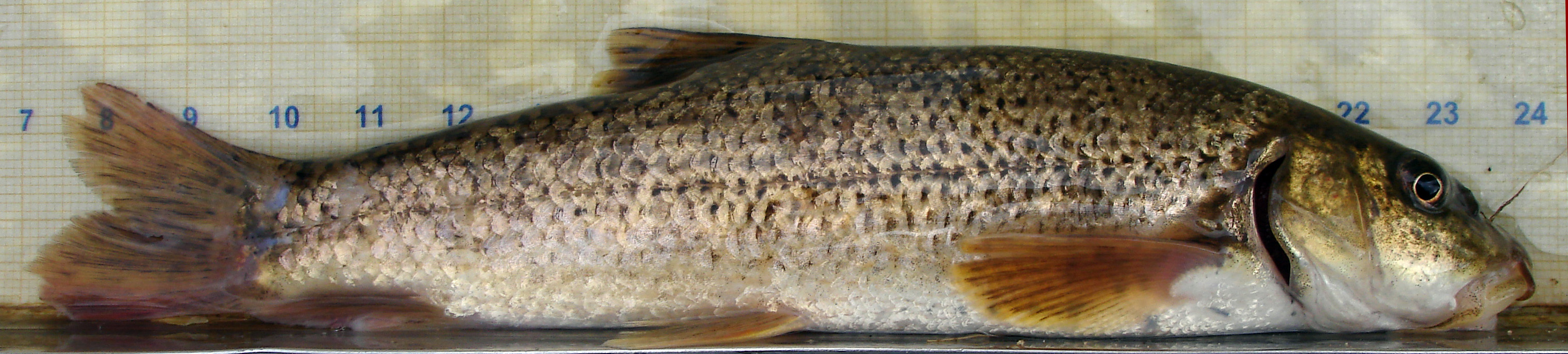
Barbus haasi, one of several species known as Redtail barb

Genera that contain species with common names including "barb":

- Amatolacypris – Border barb
- Balantiocheilos – burnt-tailed barb
- Barbichthys
- Barbodes
- Barboides
- Barbonymus – tinfoil barbs
- Barbopsis
- Barbus – typical barbels
- Caecobarbus
- Capoeta
- Carasobarbus
- Catlocarpio – Giant barb
- Coptostomabarbus
- Cyclocheilichthys
- Dawkinsia
- Desmopuntius
- Discherodontus
- Eechathalakenda
- Enteromius – African barbs
- Esomus – flying barbs
- Garra
- Hypselobarbus
- Hypsibarbus
- Labeobarbus
- Labiobarbus
- Leptobarbus
- Luciobarbus (may belong in Barbus)
- Megarasbora
- Namaquacypris
- Osteochilus
- Paracapoeta
- Pethia
- Poropuntius
- Probarbus
- Puntigrus – tiger barbs
- Puntioplites
- Puntius
- Raiamas – trout barb
- Sahyadria
- Sawbwa – Sawbwa Barb
- Waikhomia – Khavli barb

== See also ==
- Barbel (fish)
