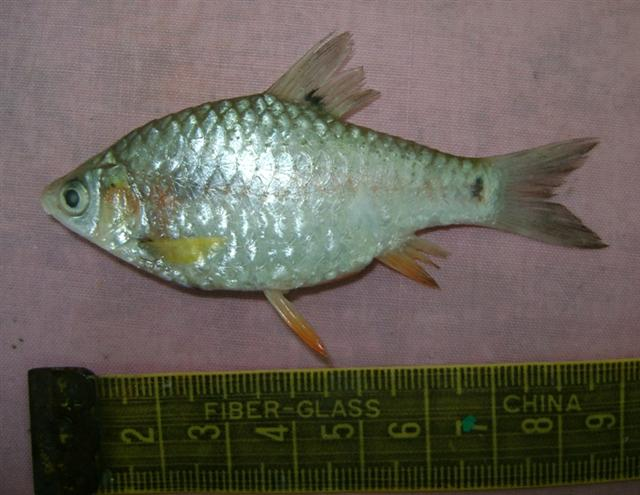
- Puntius sophore

Scientific classification
- Kingdom: Animalia
- Phylum: Chordata
- Class: Actinopterygii
- Order: Cypriniformes
- Family: Cyprinidae
- Subfamily: Smiliogastrinae
- Genus: Puntius; Hamilton, 1822

Type species
- Cyprinus sophore Hamilton, 1822

Species
- See text

= Puntius =

Genus of fishes

Puntius is a genus of small freshwater fish in the family Cyprinidae native to South Asia and Mainland Southeast Asia, as well as Taiwan.

Many species formerly placed in Puntius have been moved to other genera such as Barbodes, Dawkinsia, Desmopuntius, Haludaria, Oliotius, Pethia, Puntigrus, Sahyadria and Systomus.

Previously, it was assumed that the earliest record of this genus was the fossil species Puntius bussyi from the Eocene of Sumatra, but a 2020 study reclassified this species into the new genus Pauciuncus, possibly in the subfamily Smiliogastrinae.

== Etymology ==
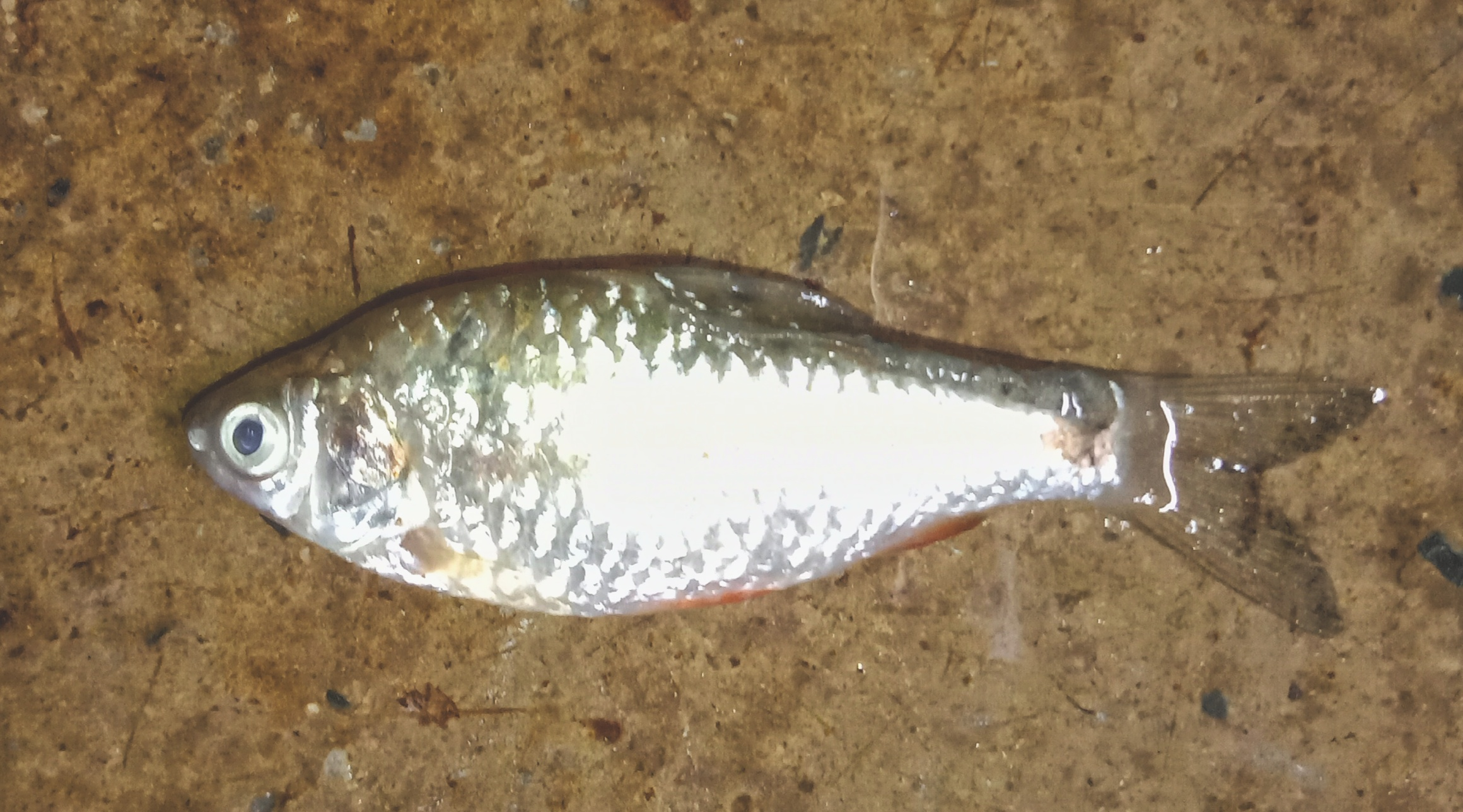
Punti maach (Puntius fish) in West Bengal, India.

The name Puntius comes from Bengali: পুঁটি (pũṭi, Bengali pronunciation: [pũʈi]), a term for small cyprinids.The Bengali word is inherited via Prakrit from Sanskrit proṣṭhī.

== Range ==
Fishes of the genus Puntius are found in South Asia (west to Pakistan and south to Sri Lanka) and Mainland Southeast Asia, with a single species, P. snyderi, in Taiwan. The greatest species richness is in India.

== Description ==
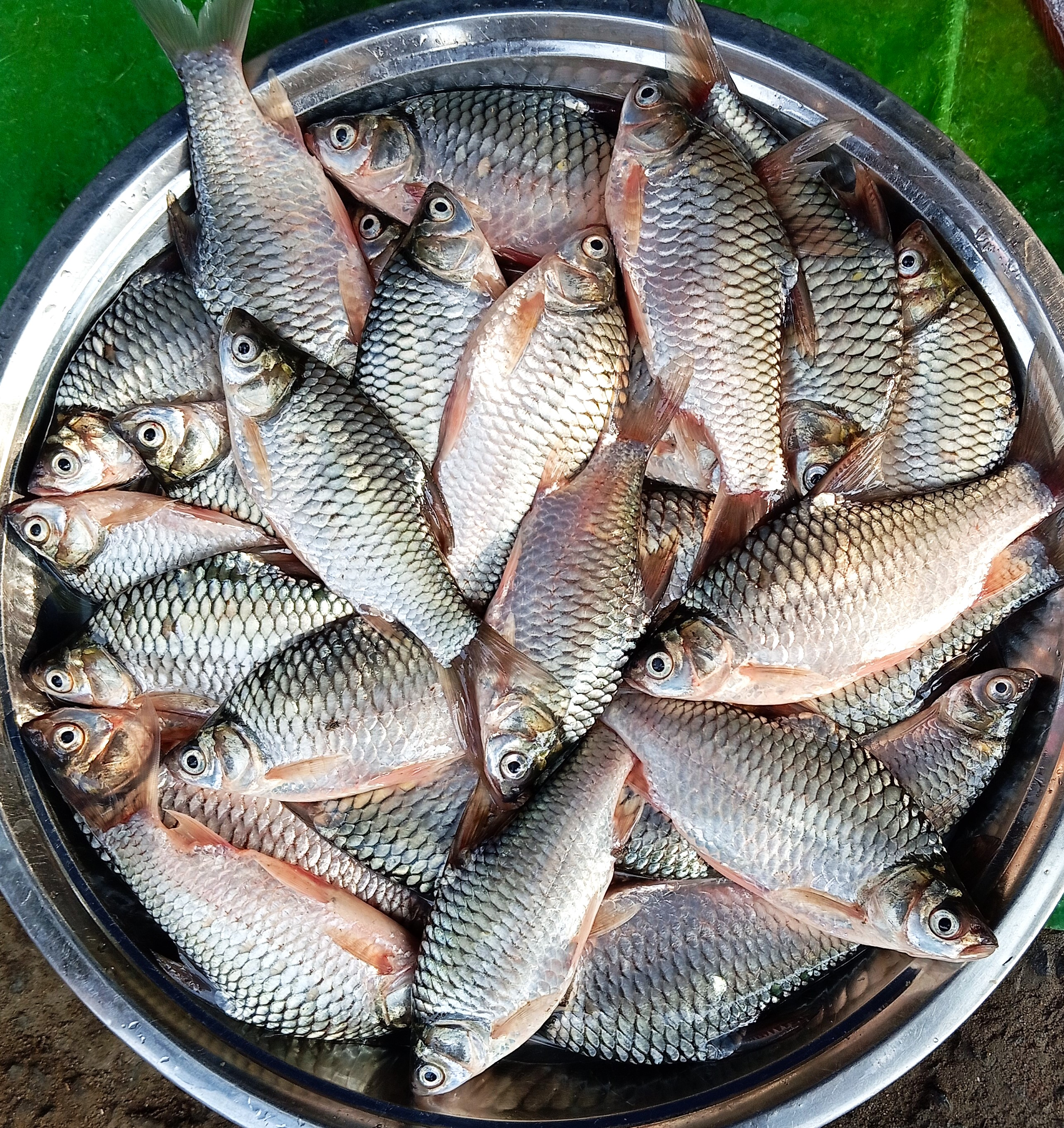
Puntius of West Bengal, India

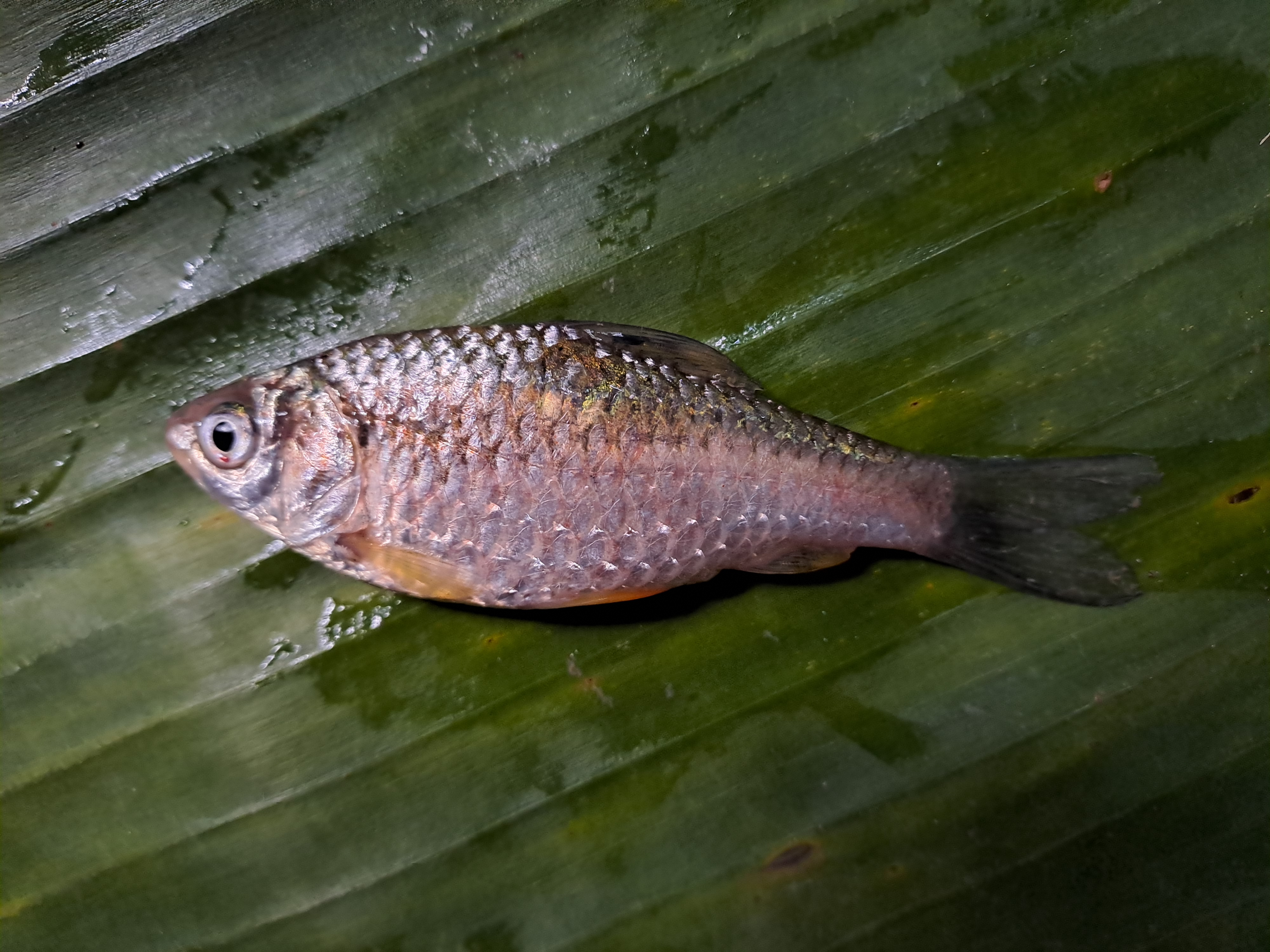
Chola barb (Puntius chola)

The maximum size for an adult of this genus is 25 cm (10 in), but most species reach 7–15 cm (2.8–5.9 in) and some species do not surpass 5 cm (2 in). In appearance they may resemble miniature carp and are sometimes brightly coloured or patterned.

== Behavior ==
These fishes are omnivorous; their diet includes small invertebrates and plant matter. Breeding is by egg scattering and takes place close to the bottom, near or within areas of dense plant growth. They do not show parental care and adults may eat the young.

== Taxonomy ==
Historically, many species of Puntius have been classified in several genera, including Barbus. Despite the reclassifications, the specific epithet remains the same in these – except in cases of homonymies – as Barbus and Puntius have the same grammatical gender. The closest living relatives of the spotted barbs are the genus Cyprinion and perhaps the genus Capoeta. These and the other "typical" barbs and barbels were formerly often separated as subfamily Barbinae, but this group is highly paraphyletic with regard to the Cyprininae and better merged there at least for the largest part (including Puntius). In particular the genus Barbonymus, containing the tinfoil barb and its relatives – for some time included in Puntius – appears to be a kind of carp that has evolved convergently with barbs.

This genus is classified within the subfamily Smiliogastrinae by Eschmeyer's Catalog of Fishes.

== Species ==
These are the currently recognized species in this genus:

- Puntius amphibius (Valenciennes, 1842) (Scarlet-banded barb)
- Puntius arenatus (Day, 1878) (Arenatus barb)
- Puntius brevis (Bleeker, 1849) (Swamp barb)
- Puntius burmanicus (Day, 1878)
- Puntius cauveriensis (Hora, 1937) (Cauvery barb)
- Puntius chola (Hamilton, 1822) (Chola barb)
- Puntius crescentus Yazdani & Singh, 1994
- Puntius deccanensis Yazdani & Babu Rao, 1976 (Deccan barb)
- Puntius dolichopterus Plamoottil, 2015 (Longfin Kerala barb)
- Puntius dorsalis (Jerdon, 1849) (Long-snouted barb)
- Puntius euspilurus Plamoottil, 2016
- Puntius fraseri (Hora & Misra, 1938) (Dharna barb)
- Puntius kamalika Silva, Maduwage & Pethiyagoda, 2008
- Puntius kelumi Pethiyagoda, Silva, Maduwage & Meegaskumbura, 2008
- Puntius khohi Dobriyal, R. Singh, Uniyal, H. K. Joshi, Phurailatpam & Bisht, 2004
- Puntius kyphus Plamoottil, 2019
- Puntius layardi (Günther, 1868) (layard's barb)
- Puntius madhusoodani Kumar, Benno Pereira & Radhakrishnan, 2012
- Puntius mahecola (Valenciennes, 1844) (Mahecola barb)
- Puntius masyai Smith, 1945
- Puntius mudumalaiensis Menon & Rema Devi, 1992
- Puntius muzaffarpurensis Srivastava, Verma & Sharma, 1977
- Puntius nangalensis Jayaram, 1990
- Puntius nelsoni Plamoottil, 2014 (Travancore yellow barb)
- Puntius nigronotus Plamoottil, 2014 (Malabar black-backed barb)
- Puntius ocellus Plamoottil & Vineeth, 2020
- Puntius parrah Day, 1865 (Parrah barb)
- Puntius punjabensis (Day, 1871)
- Puntius sanctus Plamoottil, 2020
- Puntius snyderi Ōshima, 1919
- Puntius sophore (Hamilton, 1822) (Pool barb)
- Puntius sophoroides (Günther, 1868)
- Puntius stigma (Valenciennes, 1844)
- Puntius terio (Hamilton, 1822) (Onespot barb)
- Puntius thermalis (Valenciennes, 1844)
- Puntius viridis Plamoottil & Abraham 2014
- Puntius waageni (Day, 1872)
