= List of freshwater fish of Telangana =

This article lists the freshwater fish found in the state of Telangana, India. A total of 143 species of fish have been sighted in the state, mostly documented from surveys or from citizen surveying apps like iNaturalist. This article uses British English throughout.

== Ophichthidae ==
Common name	Binomial name	IUCN status	Notes
Rice-paddy eel	Pisodonophis boro	LC	Known from Udayasamudram

== Anguillidae ==
Common name	Binomial name	IUCN status	Notes
Indian mottled eel	Anguilla bengalensis	NT	

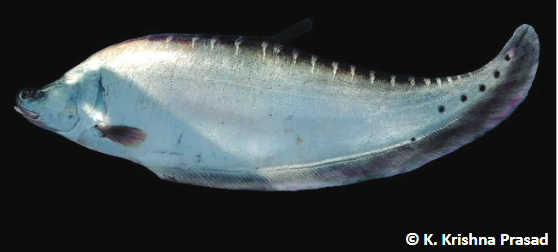
Knifefish

== Notopteridae ==
Common name	Binomial name	IUCN status	Notes
Bronze featherback	Notopterus synurus	LC	
Knifefish	Chitala chitala	NT	Known from Talai

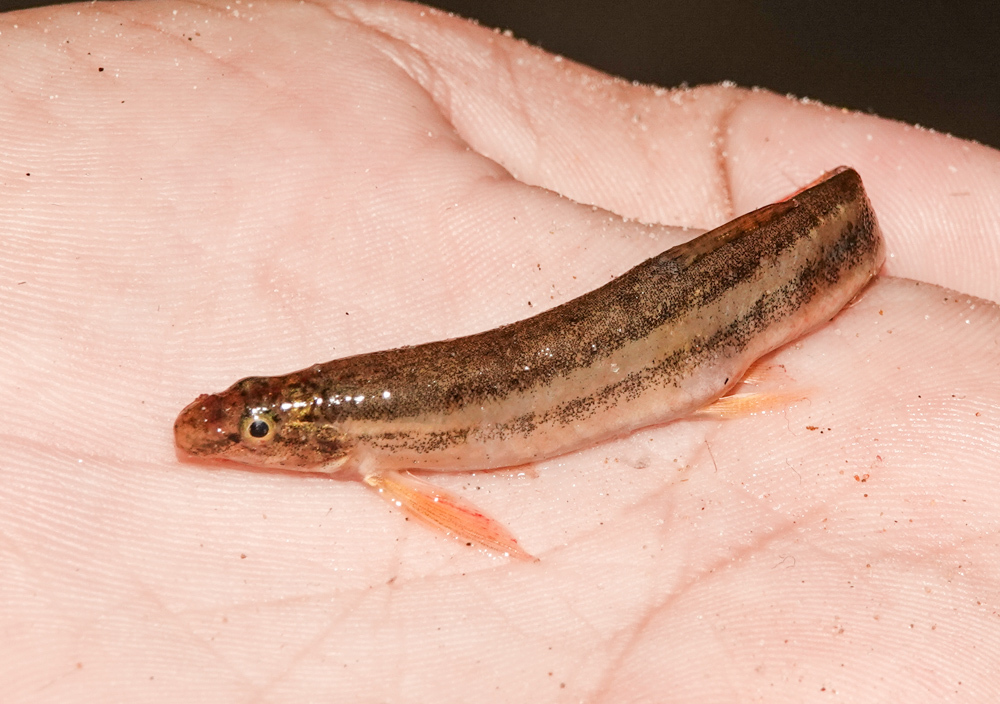
Guntea loach

== Cobitidae ==
Common name	Binomial name	IUCN status	Notes
Guntea loach	Lepidocephalichthys guntea	LC	
Common spiny loach	Lepidocephalichthys thermalis	LC	

== Clupeidae ==
Common name	Binomial name	IUCN status	Notes
Ganges river sprat	Corica soborna	LC	Known from Komaram
Ilish	Tenualosa ilisha	LC	

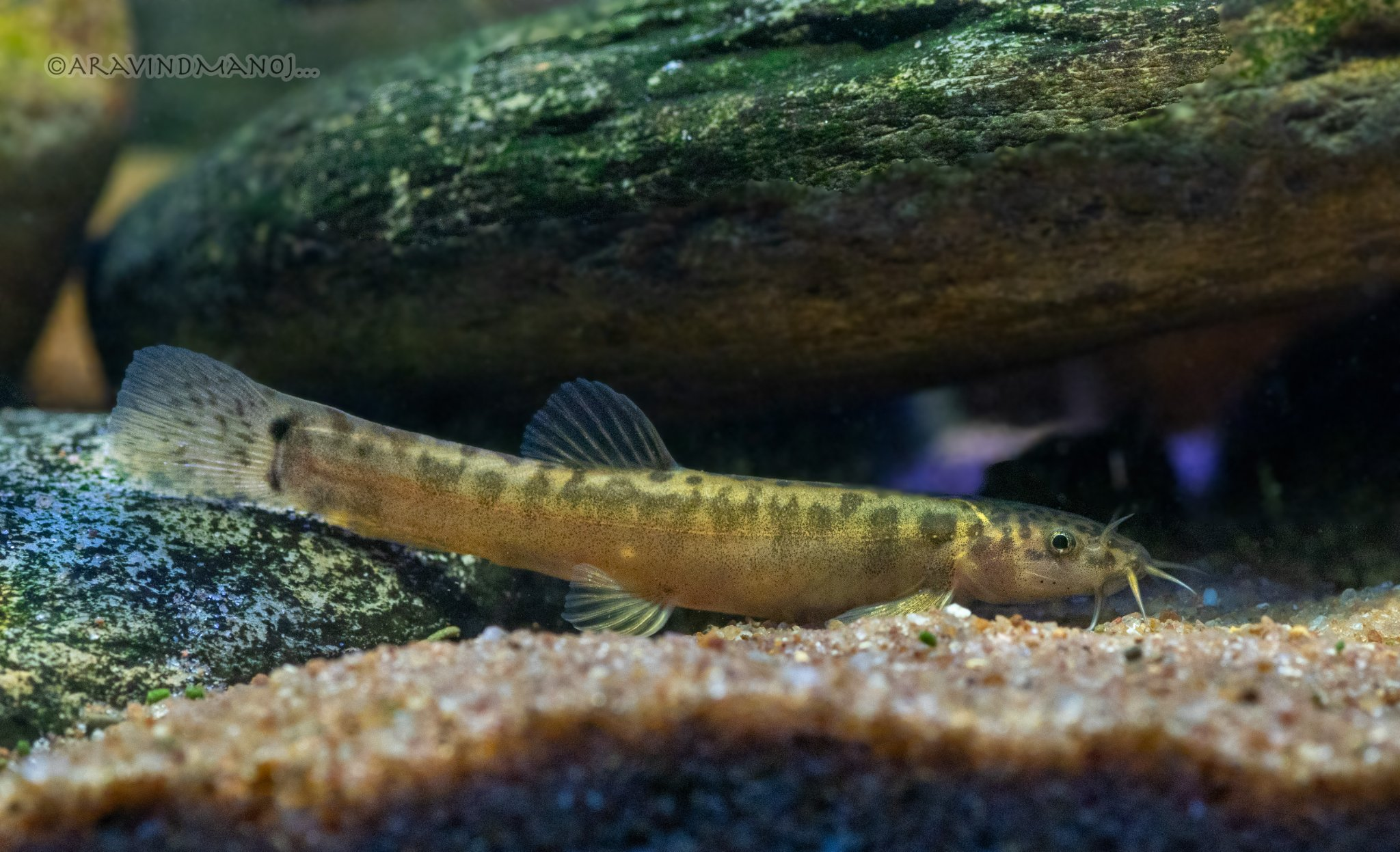
Telangana loach

== Nemacheilidae ==
Common name	Binomial name	IUCN status	Notes
Telangana loach	Indoreonectes telanganaensis	NE	Endemic to the state, known from Maisamma Loddi in Kawal Wildlife Sanctuary
Mottled loach	Paracanthocobitis botia	LC	
Murangi	Paracanthocobitis mooreh	LC	
Denison's loach	Schistura denisoni	LC	

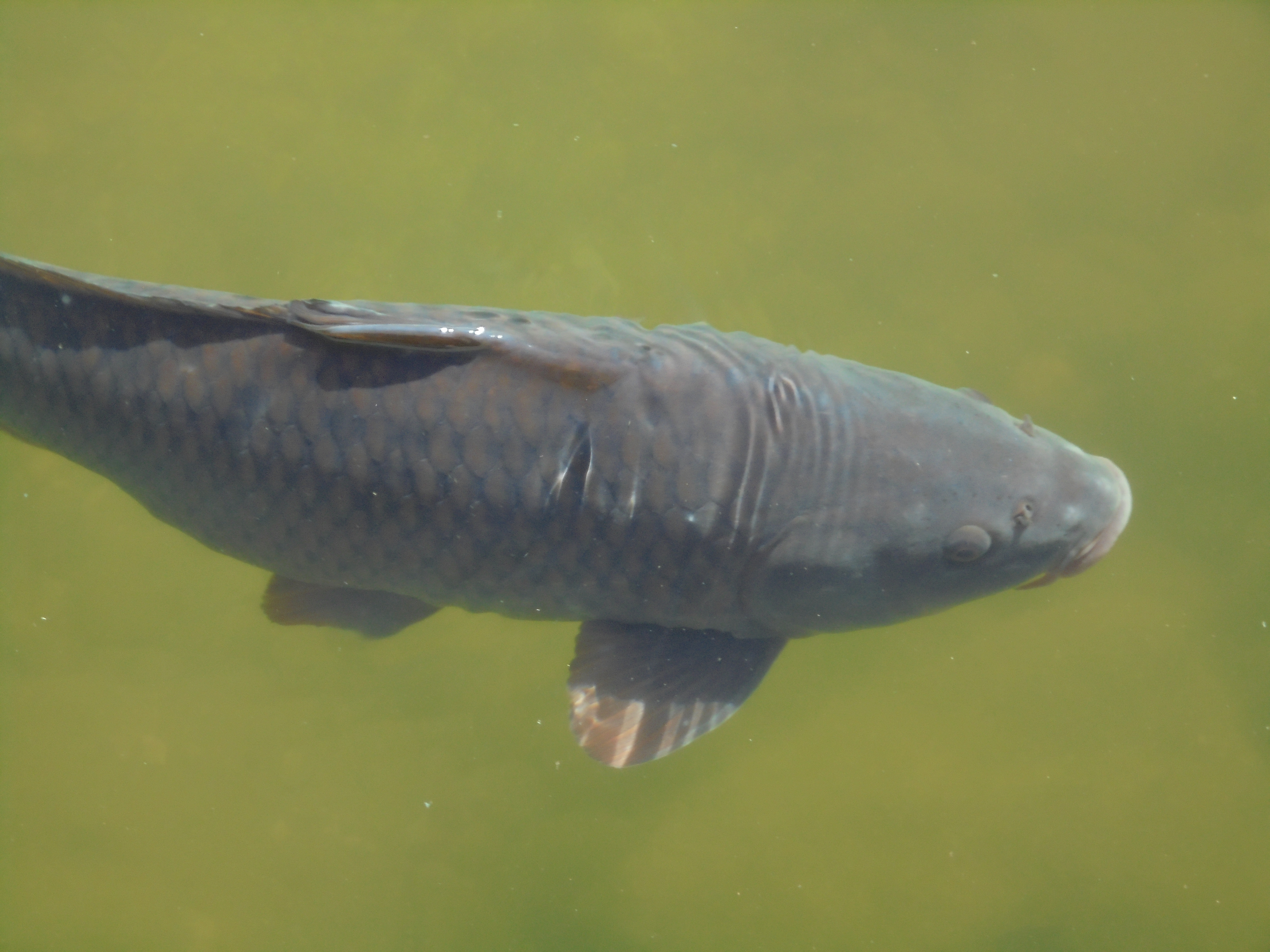
Common carp

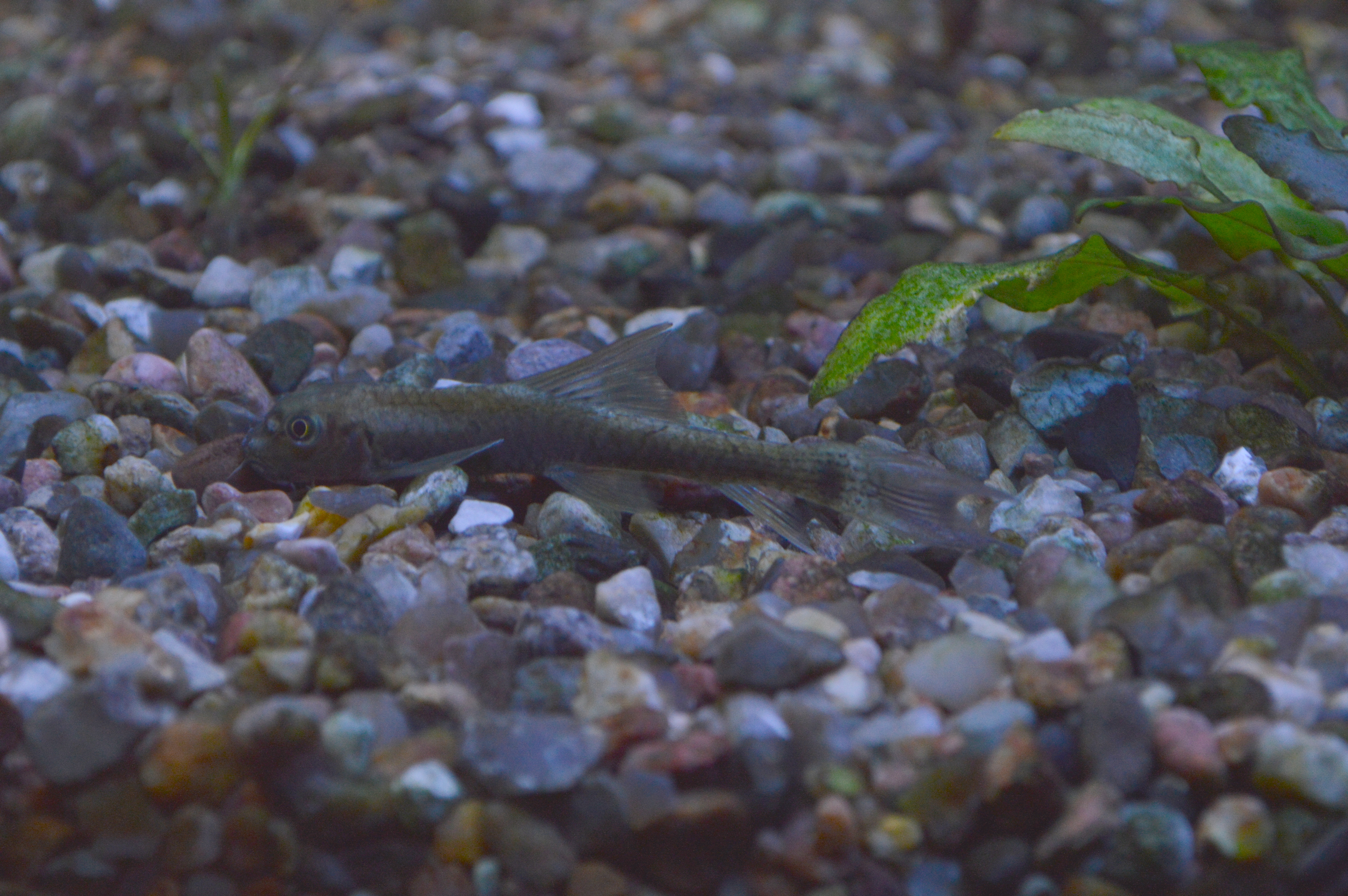
Sucker head

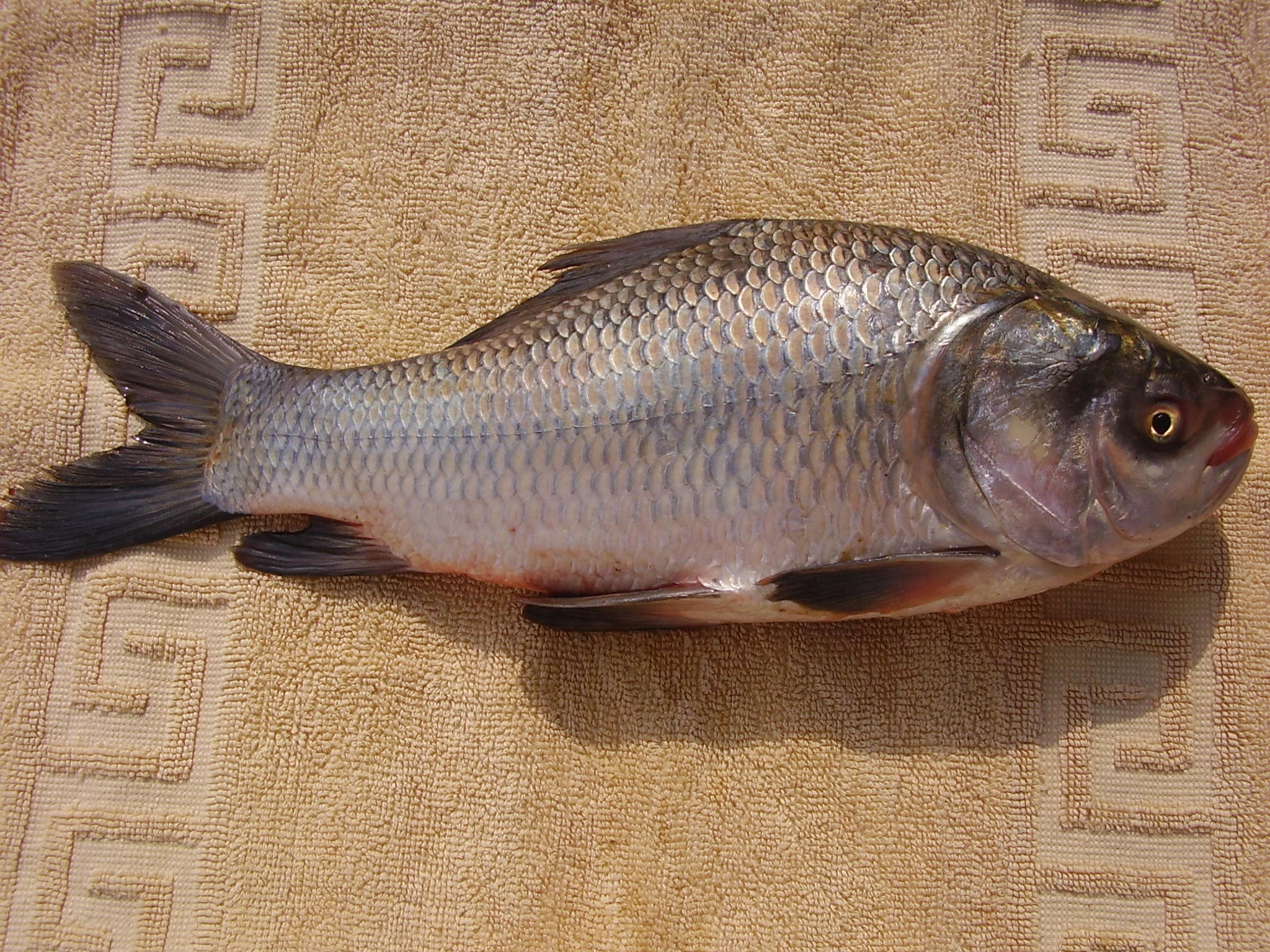
Catla

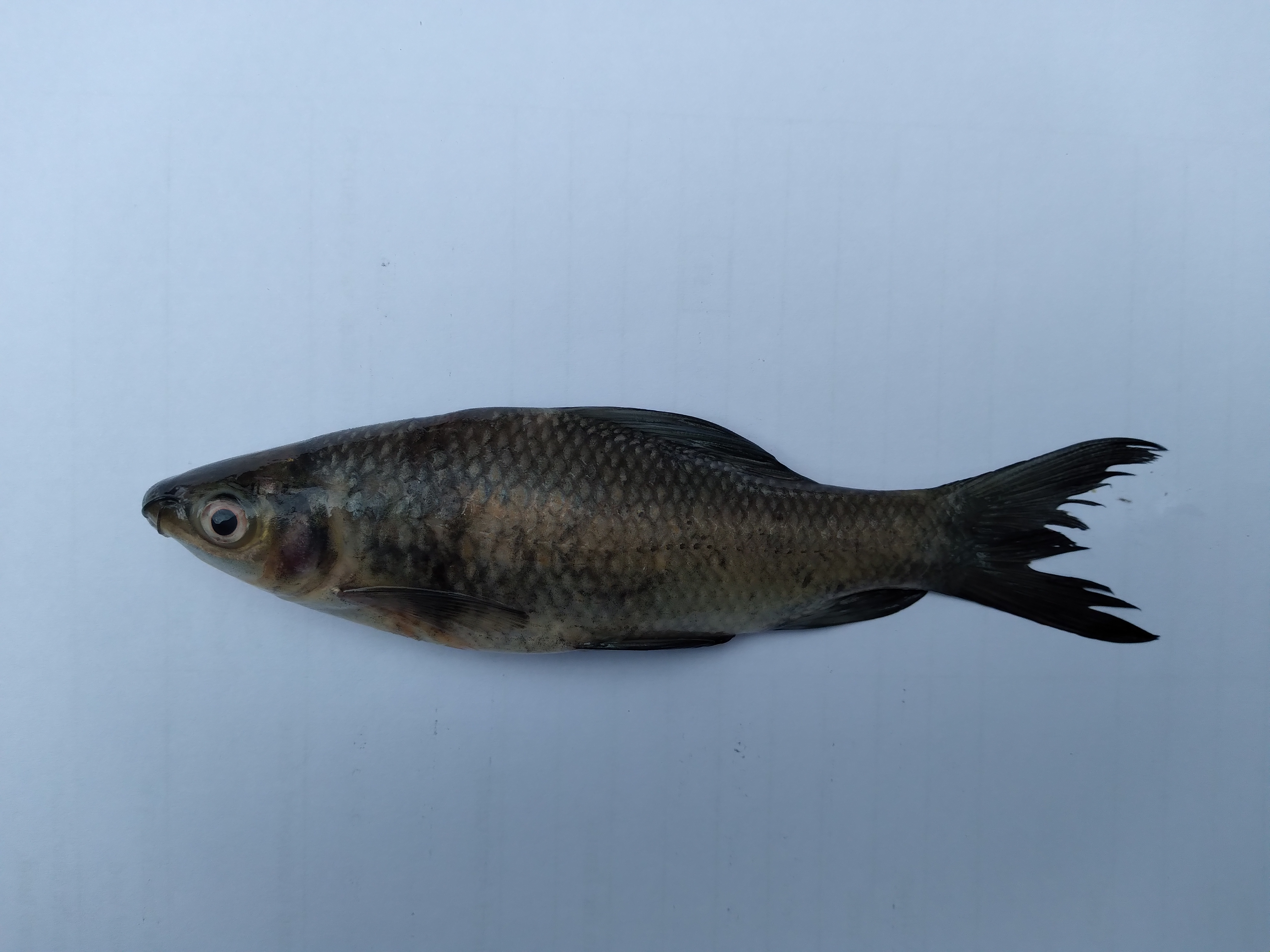
Orangefin labeo

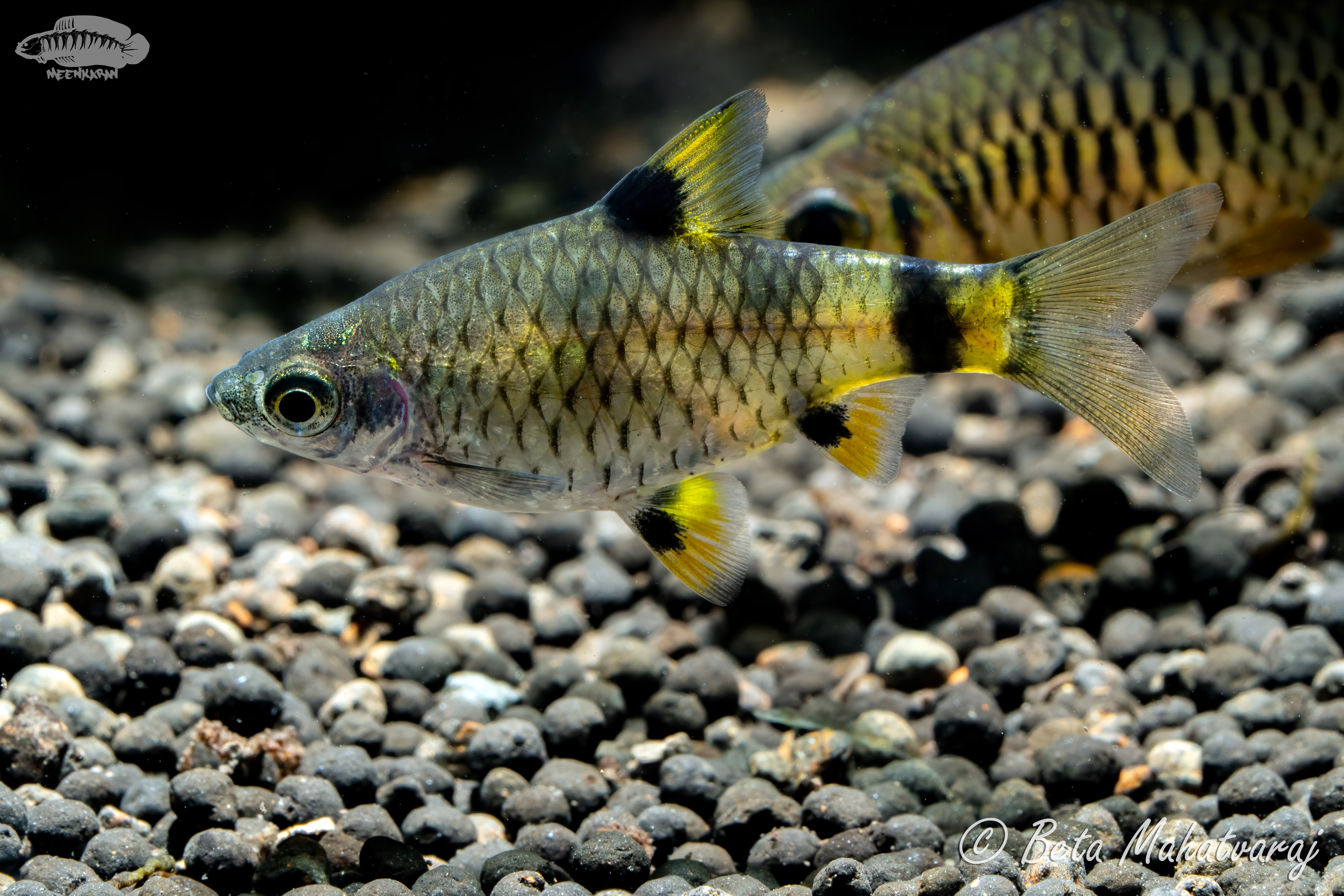
Golden barb

== Cyprinidae ==
Common name	Binomial name	IUCN status	Notes
Nukta	Bangana nukta	EN	Known from Srisailam Dam
Carnatic carp	Hypselobarbus carnaticus	LC	Known from Jamkhandi to Lingalagattu and up to Nagarjuna Sagar Dam
Mrigal carp	Cirrhinus mrigala	VU	
White carp	Cirrhinus cirrhosus	LC	
Reba carp	Cirrhinus reba	LC	
Common carp	Cyprinus carpio	NE	
Blackspot barb	Dawkinsia filamentosa	LC	
Sucker head	Garra gotyla	LC	
Sucker fish	Garra mullya	LC	
Nilgiri garra	Garra stenorhynchus	LC	
Reba	Gymnostomus ariza	LC	
Deccan white carp	Gymnostomus fulungee	LC	
Curmuca barb	Hypselobarbus curmuca	EN	Known from Nizam Sagar Dam
Jerdon's carp	Hypselobarbus jerdoni	LC	
Kolus	Hypselobarbus kolus	VU	
Hypselobarbus mussullah	Hypselobarbus mussullah	EN	
Bata	Labeo bata	LC	
Boga labeo	Labeo boga	LC	
Boggut labeo	Labeo boggut	LC	
Orangefin labeo	Labeo calbasu	LC	
Catla	Labeo catla	LC	
Fringed-lipped peninsula carp	Labeo fimbriatus	LC	
Kuria labeo	Labeo gonius	LC	Known from Godavari River flowing through Bhadradri Kothagudem
Deccan labeo	Labeo kawrus	LC	
Pangusia labeo	Labeo pangusia	NT	
Bombay labeo	Labeo porcellus	LC	
Cauvery labeo	Labeo potail	EN	
Rohu	Labeo rohita	LC	
Peninsular osteobrama	Osteobrama peninsularis	NE	
Nilgiri osteobrama	Osteobrama neilli	LC	
Godavari osteobrama	Osteobrama vigorsii	LC	
Konti barb	Osteochilichthys thomassi	LC	Known from Krishna River between Rekulampally to Nagarjunasagar Dam
Rosy barb	Pethia conchonius	LC	
Golden barb	Pethia gelius	LC	Known from Godavari River, Peddapalli district and Nizam Sagar Reservoir
Ticto barb	Pethia ticto	LC	
Scarlet-banded barb	Puntius amphibius	DD	
Redside barb	Puntius bimaculatus	LC	
Swamp barb	Puntius chola	LC	
Long-snouted barb	Puntius dorsalis	LC	
Wynaad barb	Puntius melanostigma	NE	Known from Krishna River and Bejjur
Pool barb	Puntius sophore	LC	
Greenstripe barb	Puntius vittatus	LC	
Rohtee	Rohtee ogilbii	LC	
Olive barb	Systomus sarana	LC	
Stone roller	Tariqilabeo latius	LC	Known from Krishna River between Rekulampally to Srisailam Dam and Hyderabad environs
Sandkhol carp	Thynnichthys sandkhol	EN	
Deccan mahseer	Tor khudree	LC	

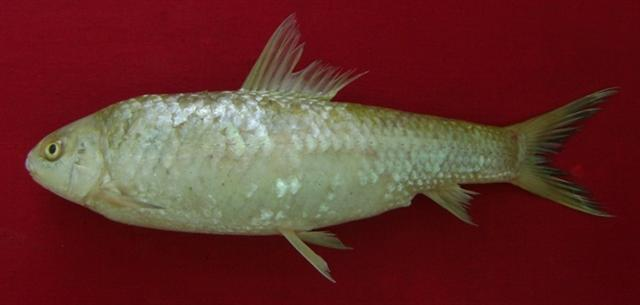
Morari

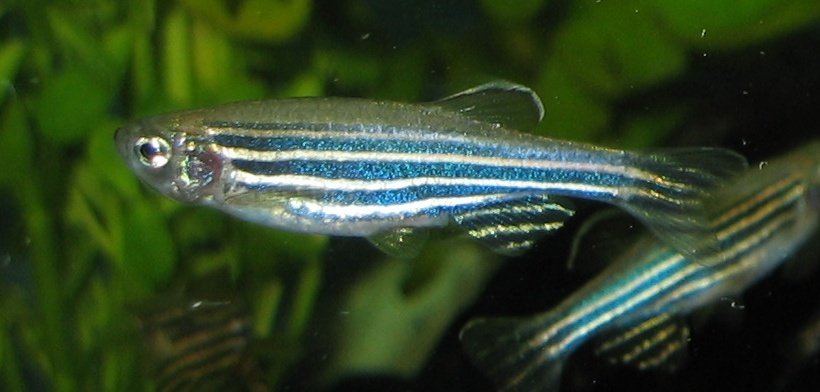
Zebrafish

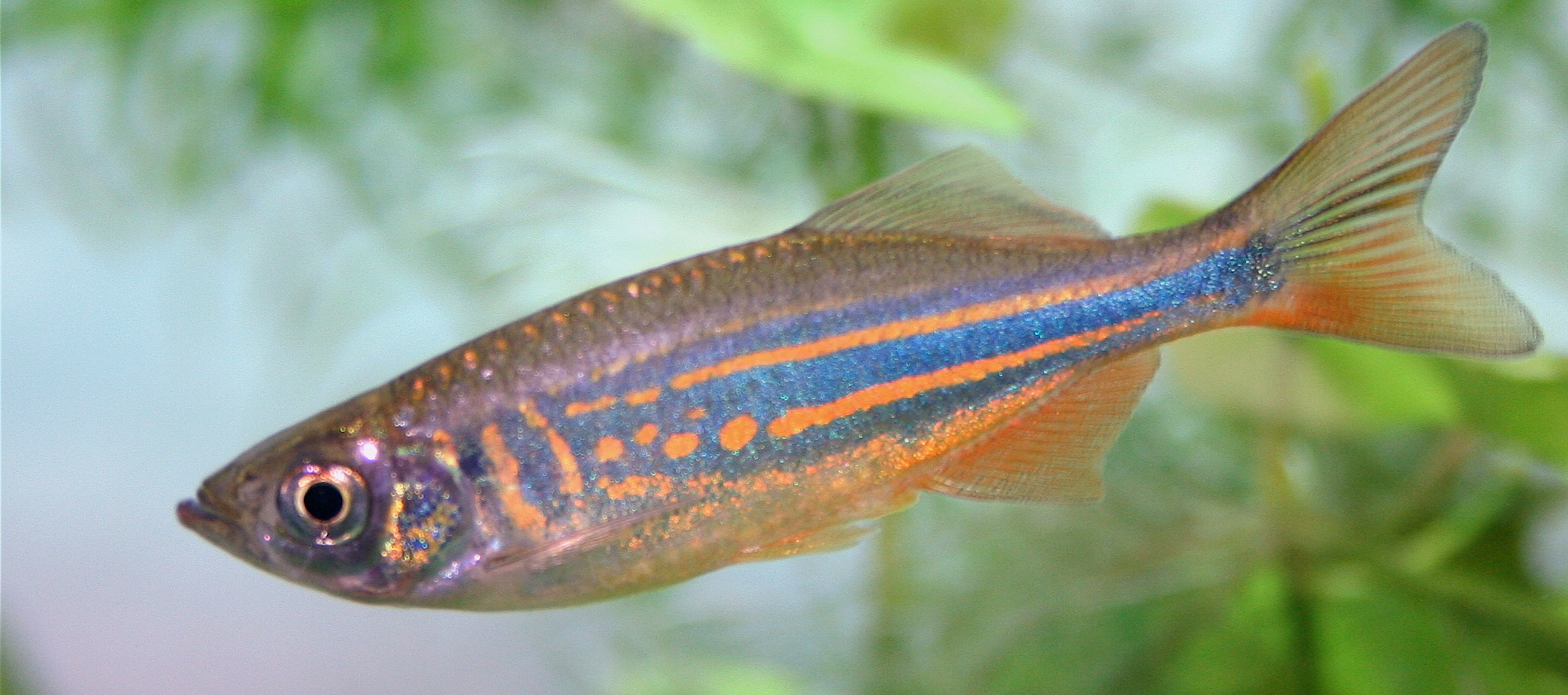
Giant danio

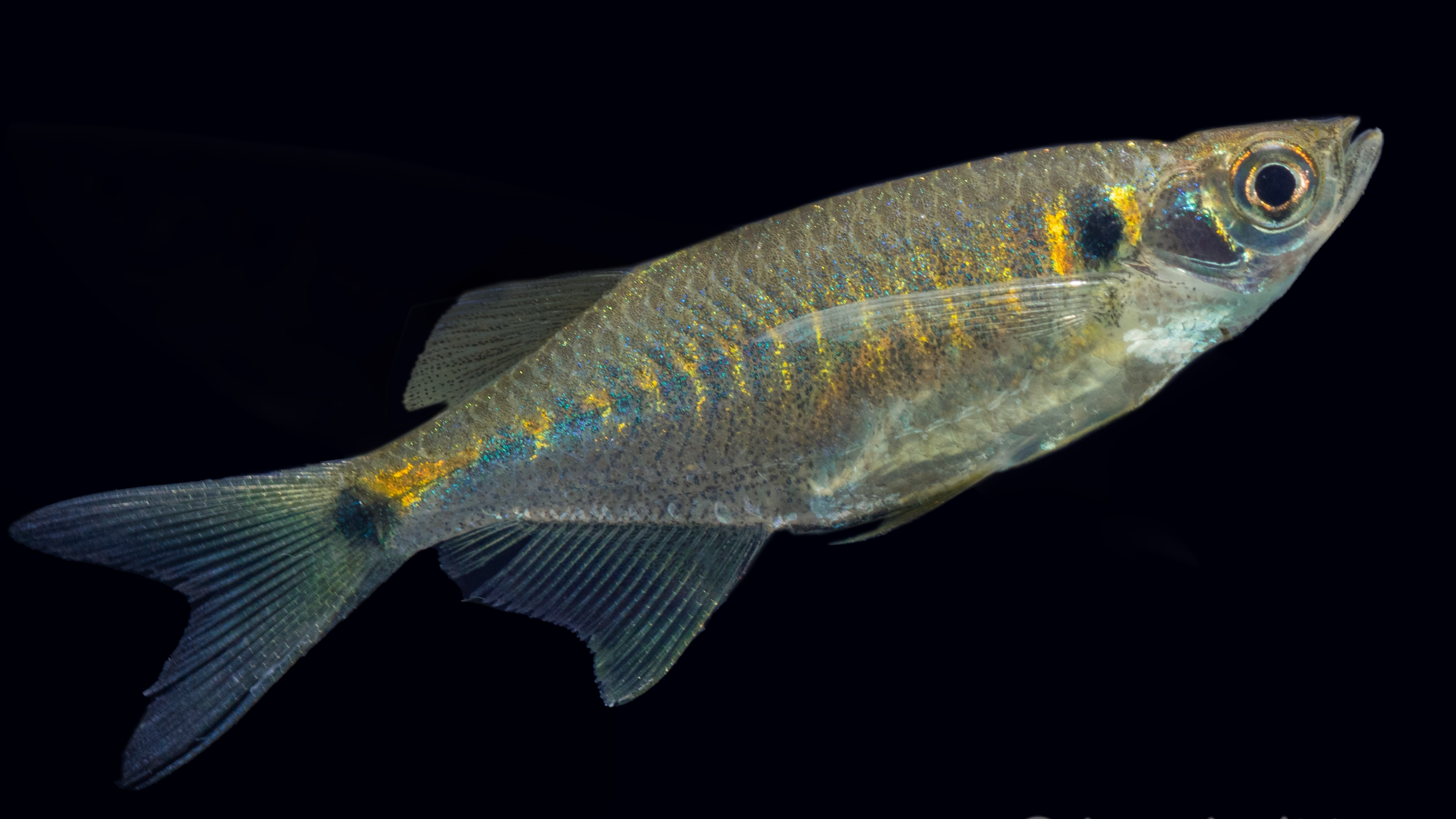
Indian glass barb

== Danionidae ==
Common name	Binomial name	IUCN status	Notes
Mola carplet	Amblypharyngodon mola	LC	
Barred baril	Barilius barila	LC	
Morari	Cabdio morar	LC	
Silver hatchet chela	Chela cachius	LC	
Zebrafish	Danio rerio	LC	
Giant danio	Devario aequipinnatus	LC	
Bengal danio	Devario devario	LC	
Indian flying barb	Esomus danrica	LC	
Flying barb	Esomus thermoicos	LC	Known from Janampeta and Koil Sagar Reservoir in Mahbubnagar District
Indian glass barb	Laubuka laubuca	LC	
Barna baril	Opsarius barna	LC	
Hamilton's baril	Opsarius bendelisis	LC	
Slender rasbora	Rasbora daniconius	LC	
Gangetic scissortail rasbora	Rasbora rasbora	LC	
Silver razorbelly minnow	Salmostoma acinaces	LC	
Large razorbelly minnow	Salmostoma bacaila	LC	
Blotch razorbelly minnow	Salmostoma balookee	LC	
Boopis razorbelly minnow	Salmostoma boopis	LC	
Hora razorbelly minnow	Salmostoma horai	VU	
Novacula razorbelly minnow	Salmostoma novacula	LC	
Finescale razorbelly minnow	Salmostoma phulo	LC	
Mahanadi razorbelly minnow	Salmostoma untrahi	LC	

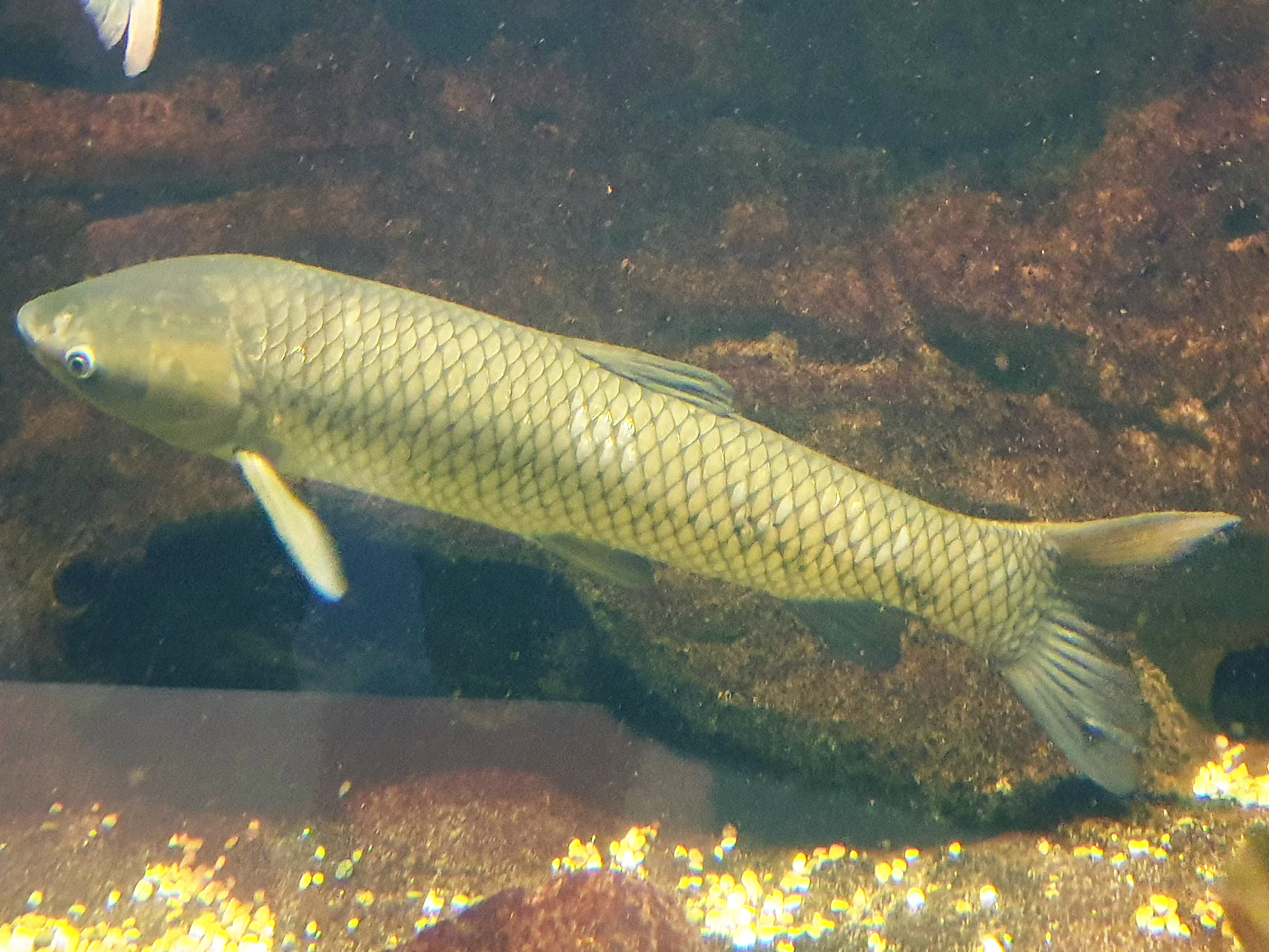
Grass carp

== Xenocyprididae ==
Common name	Binomial name	IUCN status	Notes
Grass carp	Ctenopharyngodon idella	NE	
Silver carp	Hypophthalmichthys molitrix	NE	
Bighead carp	Hypophthalmichthys nobilis	NE	

== Characidae ==
Common name	Binomial name	IUCN status	Notes
Red-bellied pacu	Piaractus brachypomus	NE	

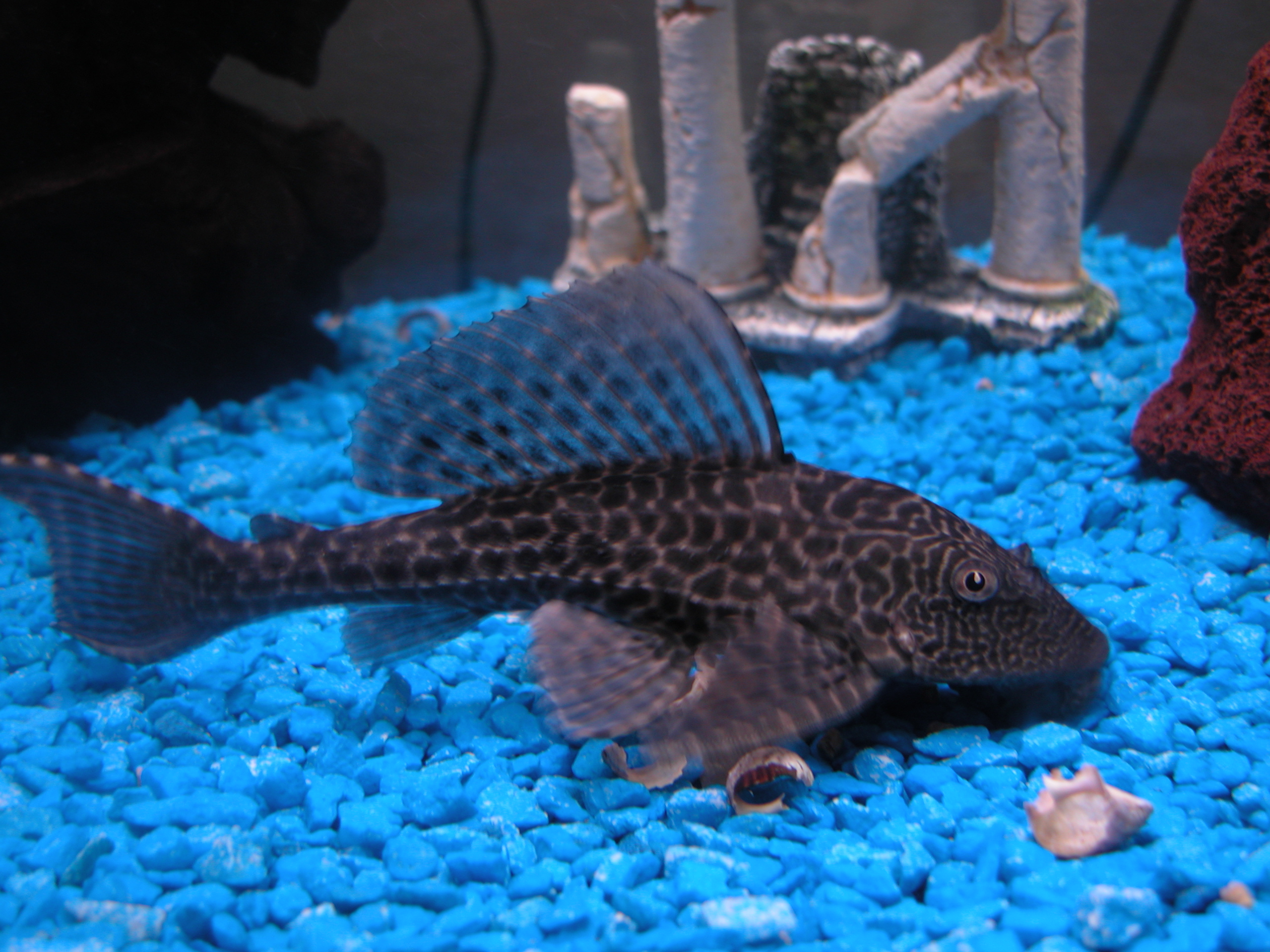
Amazon sailfin catfish

== Loricariidae ==
Common name	Binomial name	IUCN status	Notes
Amazon sailfin catfish	Pterygoplichthys pardalis	NE	

== Ailiidae ==
Common name	Binomial name	IUCN status	Notes
Goongwaree vacha	Eutropiichthys goongwaree	DD	
Indian taakree	Proeutropiichthys taakree	LC	
Schlibid catfish	Silonia childreni	EN	

== Horabagridae ==
Common name	Binomial name	IUCN status	Notes
Khavalchor catfish	Pachypterus khavalchor	NE	Known from Krishna River between Jamkhandi to Lingalagattu

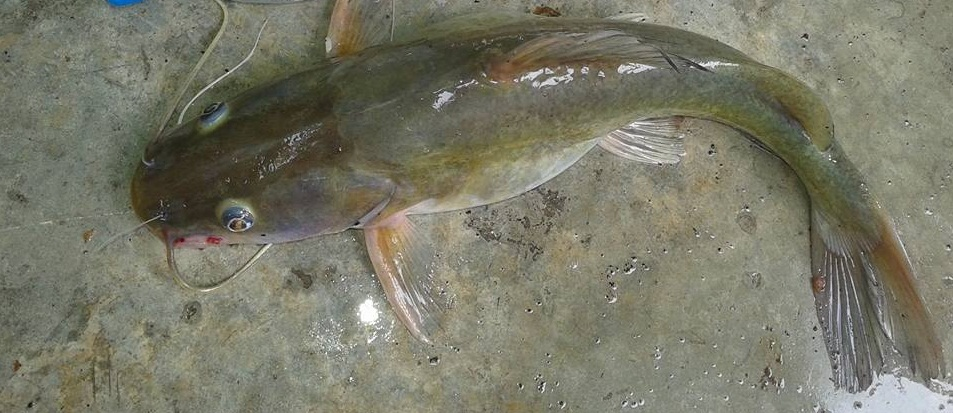
Long-whiskered catfish

== Bagridae ==
Common name	Binomial name	IUCN status	Notes
Krishan mystus	Hemibagrus maydelli	LC	
Day's mystus	Mystus bleekeri	LC	
Gangetic mystus	Mystus cavasius	LC	
Long whiskers catfish	Mystus gulio	LC	
Tengara catfish	Mystus tengara	LC	
Striped dwarf catfish	Mystus vittatus	LC	
Gogra rita	Rita gogra	LC	
Deccan rita	Rita kuturnee	LC	
Bakalu rita	Rita bakalu	NE	Endemic to the state, known from type locality - Talai near Bejjur
Long-whiskered catfish	Sperata aor	LC	
Giant river catfish	Sperata seenghala	LC	

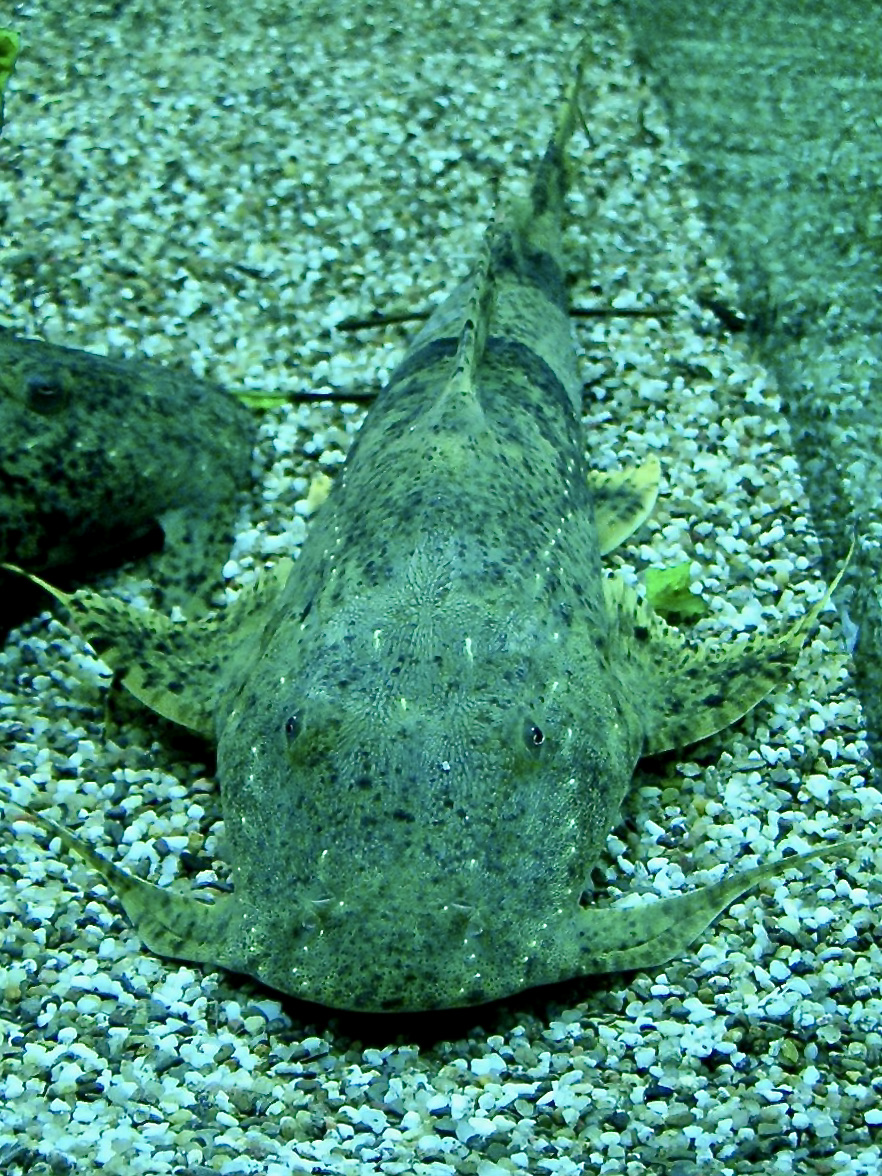
Goonch

== Sisoridae ==
Common name	Binomial name	IUCN status	Notes
Goonch	Bagarius bagarius	NT	
Deccan nangra	Gagata itchkeea	VU	
Mountain catfish	Glyptothorax lonah	LC	

== Pangassidae ==
Common name	Binomial name	IUCN status	Notes
Pangas catfish	Pangasius pangasius	LC	
Iridescent shark	Pangasianodon hypophthalmus	NE	
Silas' catfish	Pangasius silasi	NE	Known from Nagarjunasagar Reservoir

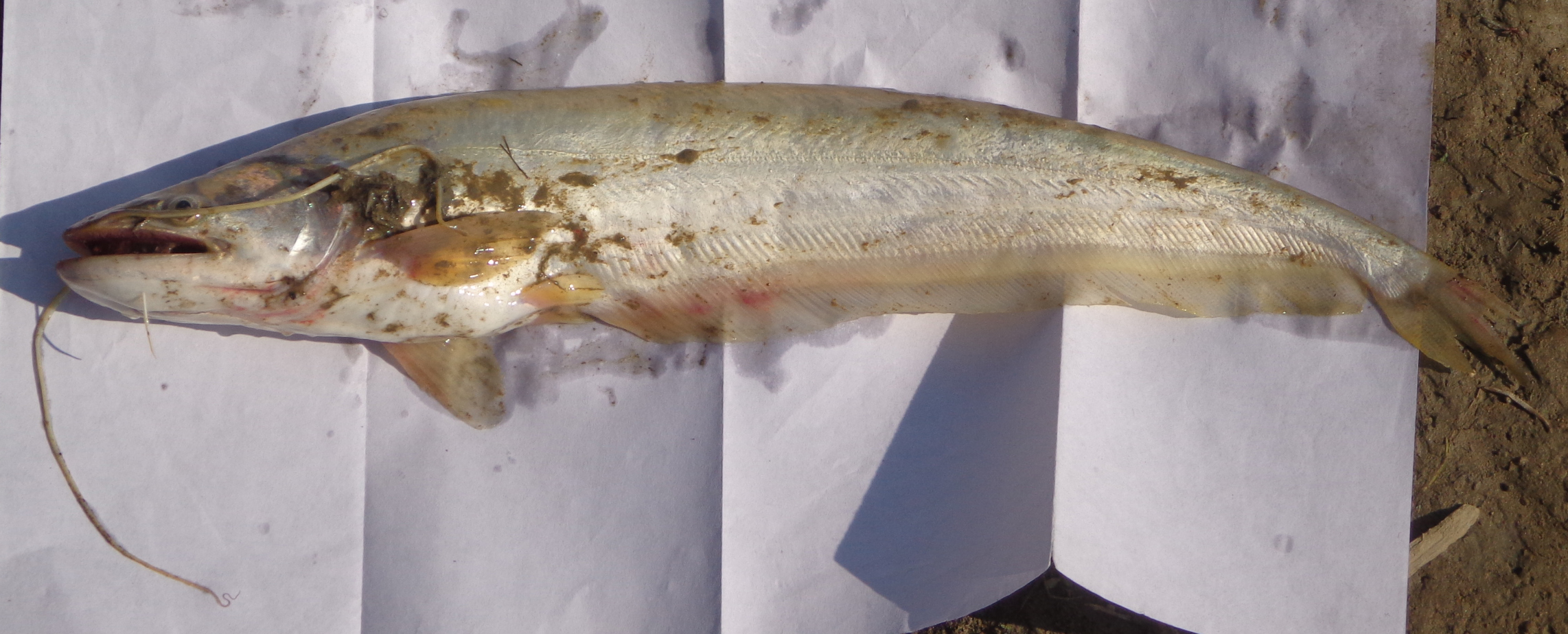
Wallago

== Siluridae ==
Common name	Binomial name	IUCN status	Notes
Butter catfish	Ompok bimaculatus	NT	
Pabdah catfish	Ompok pabda	NT	
Pabo catfish	Ompok pabo	NT	
Wallago	Wallago attu	VU	

== Clariidae ==
Common name	Binomial name	IUCN status	Notes
Magur	Clarias magur	EN	
African catfish	Clarias gariepinus	NE	

== Heteropneustidae ==
Common name	Binomial name	IUCN status	Notes
Singing catfish	Heteropneustes fossilis	LC	

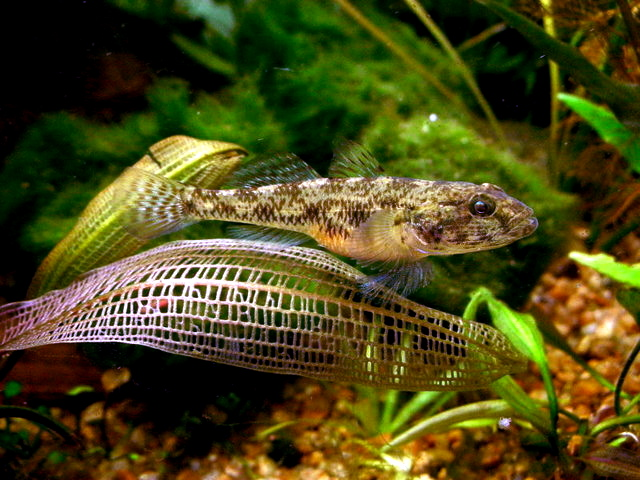
Tank goby

== Gobiidae ==
Common name	Binomial name	IUCN status	Notes
Tank goby	Glossogobius giuris	LC	

== Mastacembelidae ==
Common name	Binomial name	IUCN status	Notes
Lesser spiny eel	Macrognathus aral	LC	Known from Phulang River
Barred spiny eel	Macrognathus pancalus	LC	
Zig-zag eel	Mastacembelus armatus	LC	

== Anabantidae ==
Common name	Binomial name	IUCN status	Notes
Climbing perch	Anabas testudineus	LC	

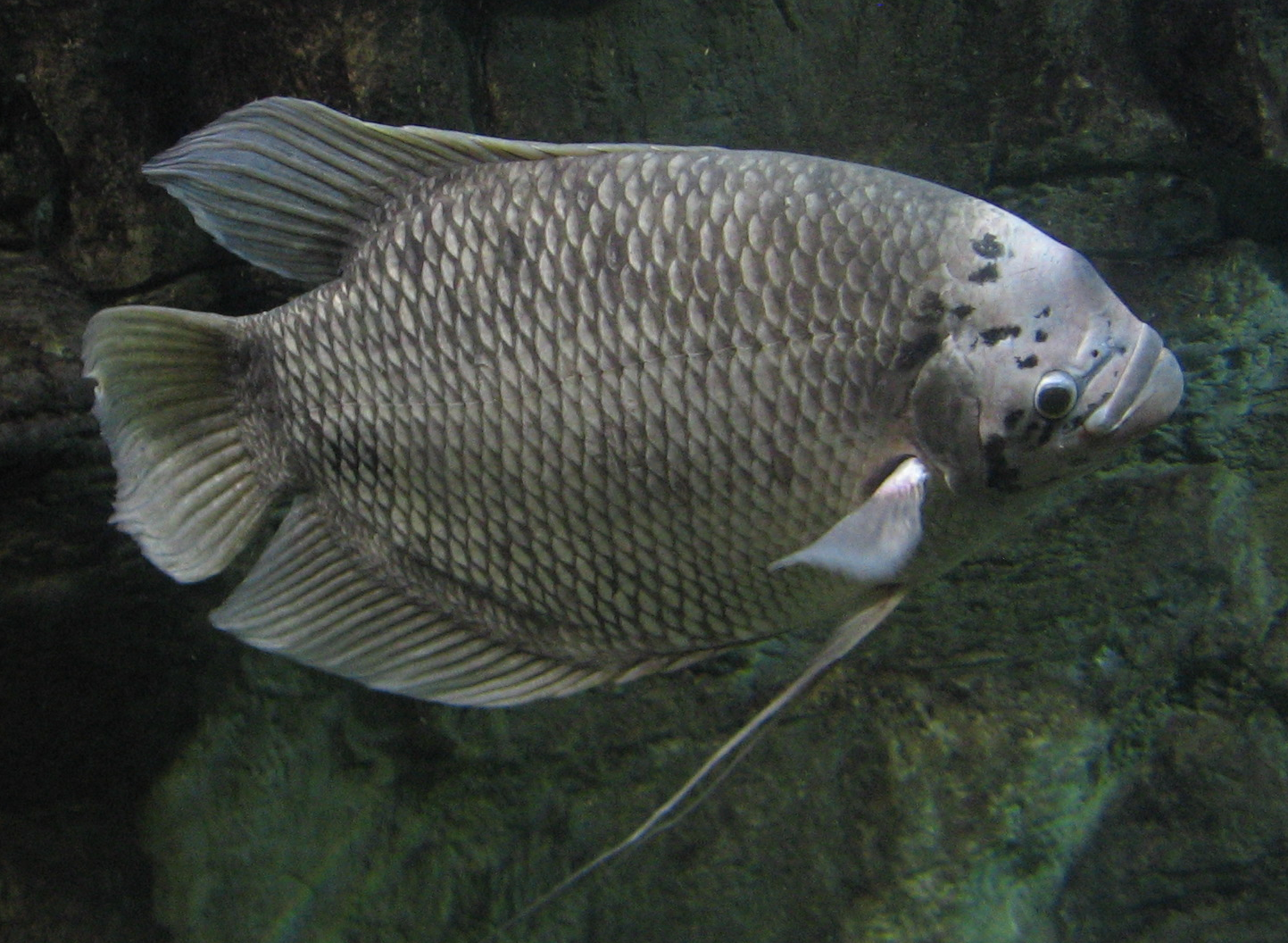
Giant gourami

== Osphronemidae ==
Common name	Binomial name	IUCN status	Notes
Giant gourami	Osphronemus goramy	NE	
Dwarf gourami	Trichogaster lalius	LC	Known from Pocharam Lake and Molachintalpally
Banded gourami	Trichogaster fasciata	LC	

== Channidae ==
Common name	Binomial name	IUCN status	Notes
Dwarf snakehead	Channa gachua	LC	
Great snakehead	Channa marulius	LC	
Spotted snakehead	Channa punctata	LC	
Striped snakehead	Channa striata	LC	

== Nandidae ==
Common name	Binomial name	IUCN status	Notes
Gangetic leaffish	Nandus nandus	LC	

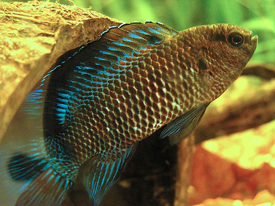
Badis

== Badidae ==
Common name	Binomial name	IUCN status	Notes
Badis	Badis badis	LC	Known only from Manjeera Reservoir and Wardha River

== Cichlidae ==
Common name	Binomial name	IUCN status	Notes
Green chromide	Etroplus suratensis	LC	
Mozambique tilapia	Oreochromis mossambicus	NE	
Nile tilapia	Oreochromis niloticus	NE	
Orange chromide	Pseudetroplus maculatus	LC	

== Aplocheilidae ==
Common name	Binomial name	IUCN status	Notes
Striped panchax	Aplocheilus lineatus	LC	
Blue panchax	Aplocheilus panchax	LC	

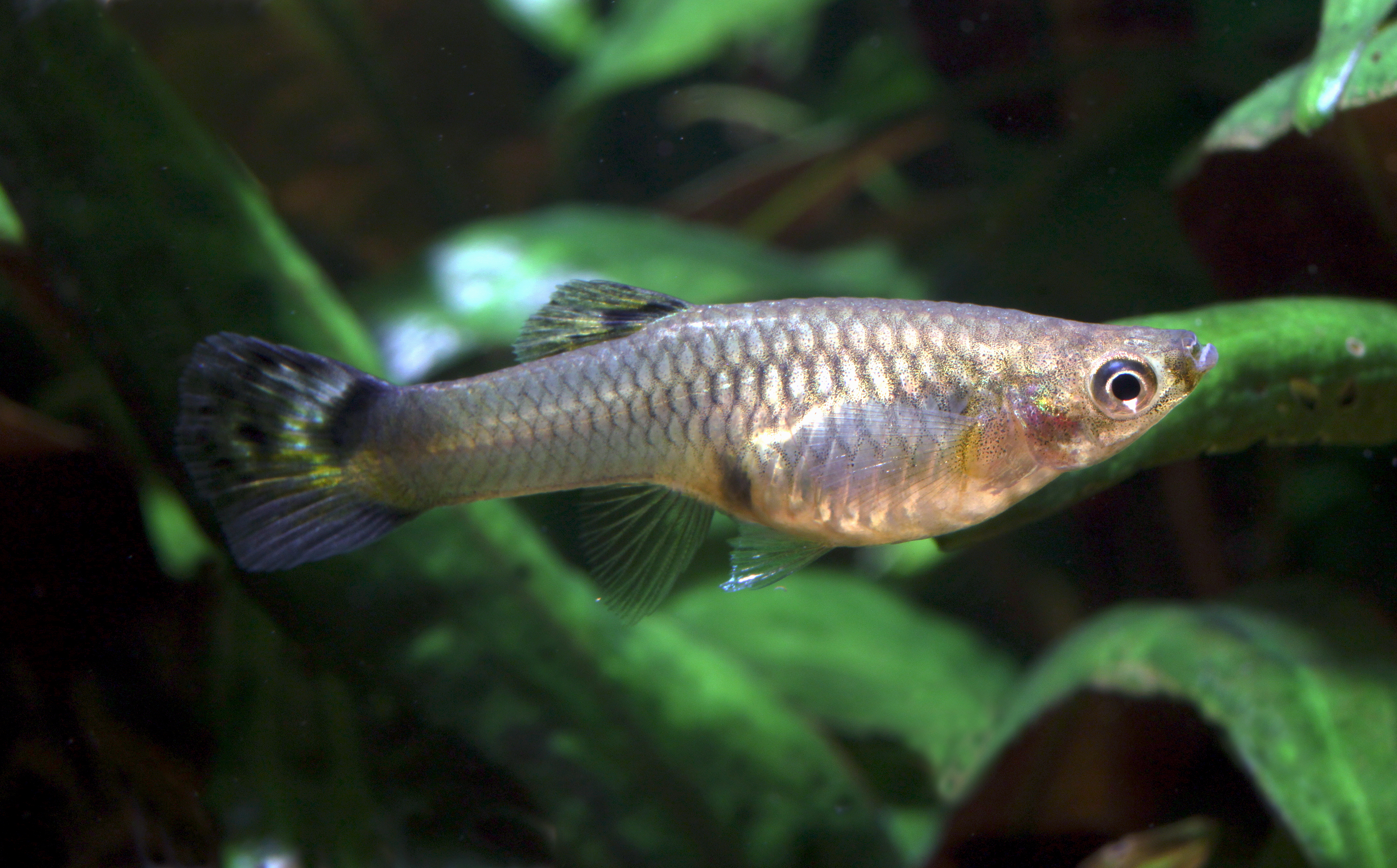
Guppy

== Poeciliidae ==
Common name	Binomial name	IUCN status	Notes
Mosquitofish	Gambusia affinis	NE	
Guppy	Poecilia reticulata	NE	

== Belonidae ==
Common name	Binomial name	IUCN status	Notes
Freshwater garfish	Xenentodon cancila	LC	

== Hemiramphidae ==
Common name	Binomial name	IUCN status	Notes
Congaturi halfbeak	Hyporhamphus limbatus	LC	

== Adrianichthyidae ==
Common name	Binomial name	IUCN status	Notes
Rice fish	Oryzias dancena	LC	

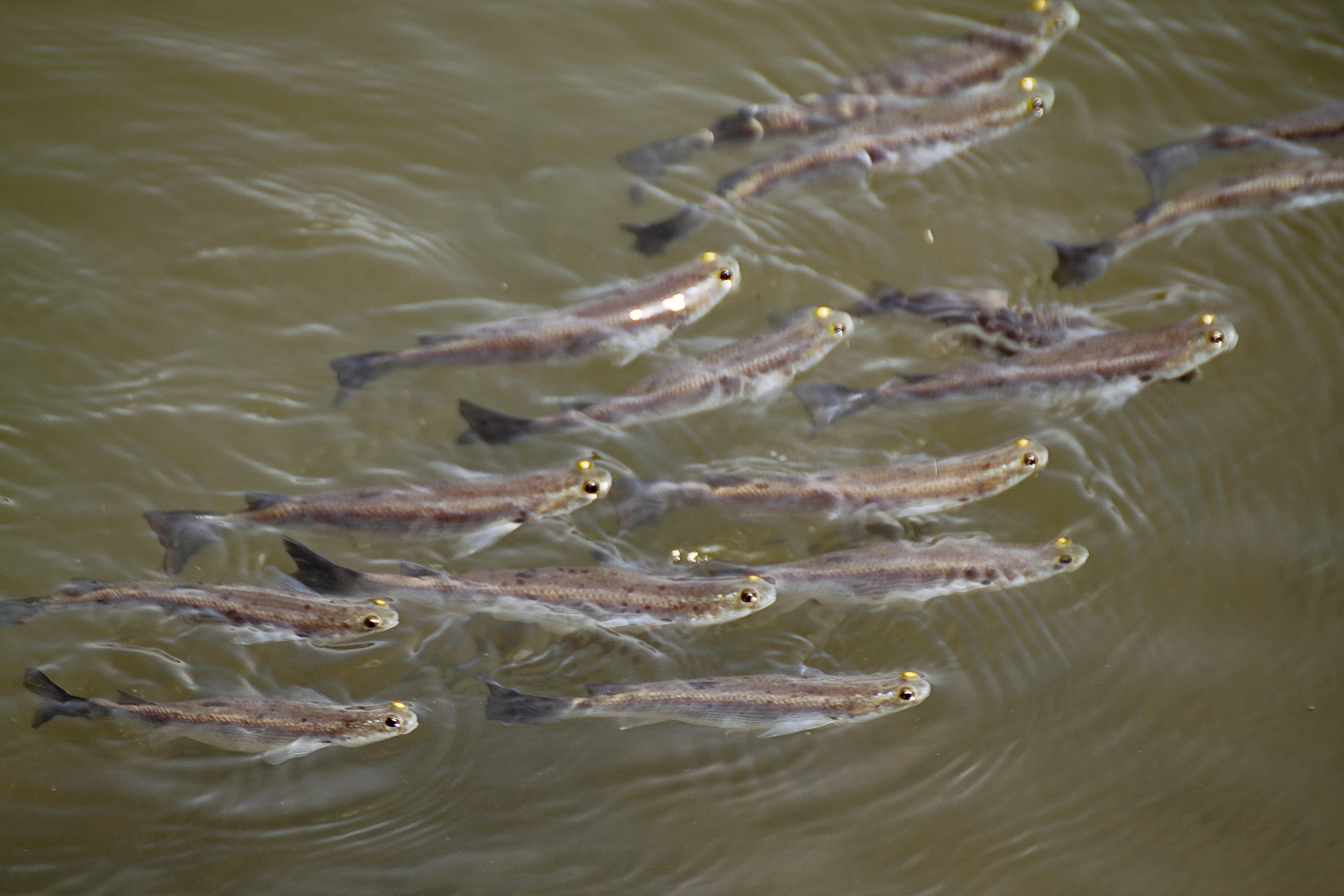
Corsula

== Mugilidae ==
Common name	Binomial name	IUCN status	Notes
Corsula	Rhinomugil corsula	LC	

== Ambassidae ==
Common name	Binomial name	IUCN status	Notes
Elongate glassy perchlet	Chanda nama	LC	
Highfin glassy perchlet	Parambassis lala	NT	
Indian glassy fish	Parambassis ranga	LC	
