= Edward Bosc Sladen =

British army officer in India (1827–1890)

Sir Edward Bosc Sladen
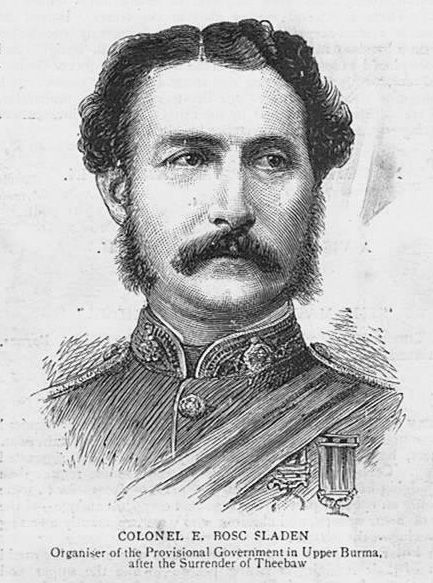
- Born: 20 November 1831; Madras, British India
- Died: 4 January 1890 (aged 58); London, England
- Education: Oswestry School
- Occupation: British army officer
- Spouses: Sophia Catherine Harrison (m. 1861; died 1865) Katherine Jane Carew (m. 1880)
- Children: Edward Sydney Sladen; Marion Ethel Sladen; Gerald Carew Sladen
- Parent(s): Ramsey Sladen; Emma Bosc

Sir Edward Bosc Sladen (20 November 1831 – 4 January 1890) was an Indian Army officer who served in India and Burma. He organised a provisional government in Upper Burma and oversaw the surrender of King Thibaw.

== Early life ==
Edward was born in Madras, British India (today known as Chennai) on 20 November 1831. He was a son of Dr. Ramsey Sladen (1782–1861), an East India Company employee and his second wife, Emma Bosc (the daughter of Colonel Paul Bosc).

He attended Oswestry School in Shropshire.

== Career ==
He joined the East India Company on 14 April 1849. He was posted in the 1st Madras fusiliers as a second lieutenant in September 1850. After seeing action in the Second Anglo-Burmese War at Pegu (now known as Bago, Myanmar) in December 1852 and again in January 1853, he became an assistant commissioner in Tenasserim (now known as the Tanintharyi Region) and was severely wounded in 1856-57 while fighting insurgent Karens and Shans in the Yunzalin District. He then moved back to mainland India and joined in the recapture of Lucknow from Indian soldiers in March 1858. He also took part in the Oudh campaign with Sir James Hope Grant and Sir Alfred Hastings Horsford.

In 1866, he went to Mandalay as agent of the chief commissioner, and in August of that year had a narrow escape from a body of insurgents who had murdered three of the royal princes. During the disturbances that ensued he embarked nearly all the Europeans and other Christians at the Burmese capital on board a river steamer and brought them safely to Rangoon, for which he received the thanks of the governor-general. The insurrection having been put down, he returned to Mandalay. In May 1867, he exerted his influence with the king to prevent the execution of three young princes, two of whom owed their lives to his intercession, the other having been beheaded before a reprieve arrived. Shortly afterwards he obtained the king's assent to a new treaty of commerce and extradition which was ratified by the governor-general on 26 November 1867.

From 1876 to 1885, Sladen was commissioner of the Arakan division and in the latter year he accompanied the force sent against King Thibaw, as chief political officer. In this capacity, on the arrival of the British troops at Mandalay, on 28 December 1885, he entered the royal palace, and received the king's submission. In a speech on 17 February 1886, the governor-general, Lord Dufferin, made special mention of ‘Colonel Sladen, to whose courage and knowledge of the people we are so much indebted for the surrender of the king’.

=== Mission to China ===
He then joined the Indian staff corps after the Madras fusiliers became a queen's regiment. In 1866 he was made chief commissioner in Mandalay. In one incident he saved the Europeans in the region from insurgents. In 1868 he headed a political mission to the Chinese frontier. This expedition started on 13 January from Mandalay through Bhamo to Moulmein and then to Yunnan and returned only in September. Information collected on the route was published as the Official Narrative of the Expedition to China via Bhamo. He wrote on the geography of the region in the Proceedings of the Royal Geographical Society (Volume 15). In 1868, during a visit to Tengyue (known as Momien in the Shan language) in modern-day Yunnan Province, China, Sladen procured a woodblock printed edition of the Chinese history of the town, which was brought back to England and deposited at the British Museum, along with a number of artefacts from SW China and Burma.

== Personal life ==
In 1861, Sladen married Sophia Catherine Harrison (1842–1865), daughter of Richard Pryce Harrison, a Bengal civil servant, and Harriette (née Cheek) Harrison. They had a son and a daughter:

- Edward Sydney Sladen (1862–1921), who was with the 4th Battalion South Wales Borderers, first as Capt., then Maj., and Lt. Col.
- Marion Ethel Sladen (1863–1897), who married Joshua Fielden, son of Joshua Fielden MP, in 1895.

Sophia died in 1865 and, in 1880, Sladen married Katherine Jane Carew (1857–1934), daughter of Robert Russell Carew of Hertfordshire. They had a son:

- Brig. Gen. Gerald Carew Sladen CB CMG DSO MC (1881–1930), who married Mabel Ursula Orr-Ewing, second daughter of Sir Archibald Orr-Ewing, 3rd Baronet of Ballikinrain.

He was knighted on 26 November 1886, and retired on 14 April 1887, dying in London three years later in London on 4 January 1890.

=== Descendants ===
Through his daughter Marion, he was a grandfather of Lionel Fielden (1896–1974), who was educated at Eton and Brasenose College, Oxford before becoming a successful producer at the BBC. He was founder and controller of Broadcasting in India (All India Radio) and was a friend of Mahatma Gandhi and John Reith, 1st Baron Reith. He owned Villa Massei, a 16th-century hunting lodge and 60 acres estate in Massa Macinaia, near the ancient walled city of Lucca, Italy.

Through his son Gerald, he was a grandfather to Ruth Violet Sladen (1919–1978), who married Oliver Kintzing Wallop, Viscount Lymington (son of Gerard Wallop, 9th Earl of Portsmouth), and was the mother of Quentin Wallop, 10th Earl of Portsmouth. Gerald's descendant Olivia Sladen married Henry FitzRoy, 12th Duke of Grafton (born 1978) and they have three children.

== Published works ==
- Anderson, John; Sladen, Edward Bosc; Browne, Horace Albert (1876). Mandalay to Momien: A Narrative of the Two Expeditions to Western China of 1868 and 1875, Under Colonel Edward B. Sladen and Colonel Horace Browne. Macmillan and Company.
- Edward Bosc Sladen (1870). Official Narrative of the Expedition to Explore the Trade Routes to China Via Bhamo. Rangoon.

== Taxon named in his honor ==
- Salmostoma sladoni is a species of ray-finned fish in the genus Salmostoma.

== In popular culture ==
- Never Shall We Be Enslaved (1997) - San Myint
- Plerng Phra Nang (2017) - Peter Tuinstra
