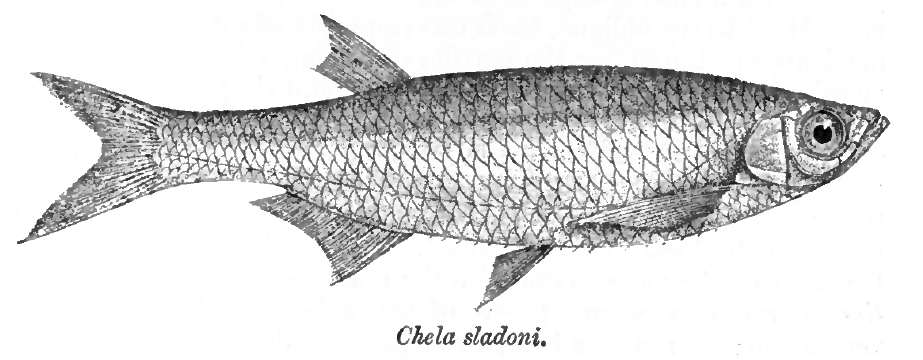
- Chela sladoni

Conservation status
- Least Concern (IUCN 3.1)

Scientific classification
- Kingdom: Animalia
- Phylum: Chordata
- Class: Actinopterygii
- Order: Cypriniformes
- Family: Danionidae
- Subfamily: Chedrinae
- Genus: Salmostoma
- Species: S. sladoni

Binomial name
- Salmostoma sladoni (F. Day, 1870)

Synonyms
- Chela sladoni Day, 1870; Salmophasia sladoni(Day, 1870)

= Salmostoma sladoni =

Species of fish

Salmostoma sladoni is a species of ray-finned fish in the genus Salmostoma.

== Etymology ==
The fish is named in honor of Maj. Edward Sladen (1827–1890).
