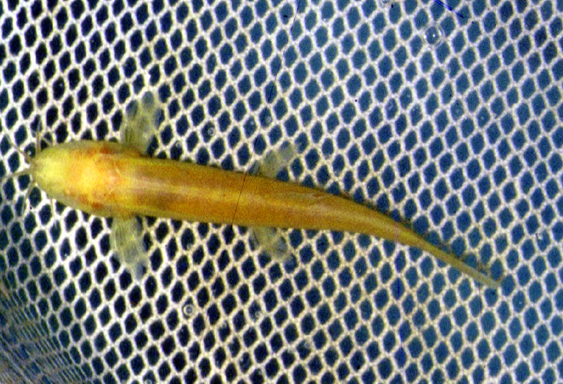
- Individual from the cave-adapted population

Conservation status
- Least Concern (IUCN 3.1)

Scientific classification
- Kingdom: Animalia
- Phylum: Chordata
- Class: Actinopterygii
- Division: Teleostei
- Order: Cypriniformes
- Family: Nemacheilidae
- Genus: Indoreonectes
- Species: I. evezardi

Binomial name
- Indoreonectes evezardi (F. Day, 1872)

Synonyms
- Nemacheilus evezardi Day, 1872; Noemacheilus evezardi Day, 1872; Oreonectes evezardi (Day, 1872)

= Indoreonectes evezardi =

Species of fish

Indoreonectes evezardi is a species of ray-finned fish in the family Nemacheilidae. Earlier it was known as Nemacheilus evezardi described by Day (1878) captured from a river stream near Pune. It is endemic to India, found in the Western Ghats and the Satpuras. Most populations are found in normal streams, but two distinct cave-adapted forms exist in Kotumsar Cave.

== Etymology ==
The fish is named in honor of Col. George C. Evezard (1826–1901), of the Bombay Staff Corps, who helped in procuring the type specimen.

== Divergence of cave populations ==
Due to lack of light and limited source of energy input (food) the cave populations of Indoreonectes evezardi are either found in albinic form with very regressed eyes or with very limited pigmentation and small eyes while compared to its epigean counterparts. Due to subterranean mode of life the complete physiological activities of the cave forms get limited and/or altered.

== IUCN status ==
Though in International Union for Conservation of Nature (IUCN) Red List of Threatened Species, this particular species is designated in Least Concern (LC) category, but it could not be ruled out that special attention is required to protect the cave forms of Indoreonectes evezardi.
