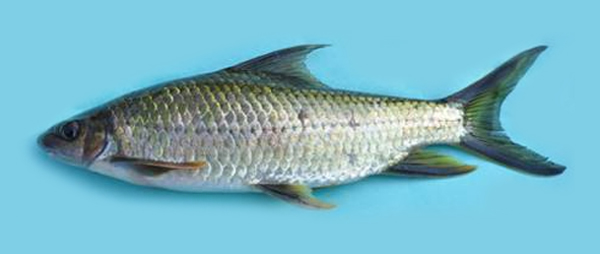

Conservation status
- Endangered (IUCN 3.1)

Scientific classification
- Kingdom: Animalia
- Phylum: Chordata
- Class: Actinopterygii
- Order: Cypriniformes
- Family: Cyprinidae
- Genus: Osteochilichthys
- Species: O. longidorsalis

Binomial name
- Osteochilichthys longidorsalis Pethiyagoda & Kottelat, 1994

Synonyms
- Osteochilus longidorsalis (Pethiyagoda & Kottelat, 1994)

= Osteochilichthys longidorsalis =

Species of fish

Osteochilichthys longidorsalis is a species of fish in the family Cyprinidae. Its common names are hiffin carp and long finned barb.

It is endemic to the Western Ghats (India) and only found in Chalakudy River and Periyar River in Kerala. Locally it is called Kuruva Paral in Malayalam. It inhabits torrential streams and is often found in pool, riffles, and cascades. They account for the largest amount of catches in fishing baits due to their abundance.
