= Orissa razorbelly minnow =

Scientific classification
- Domain: Eukaryota
- Kingdom: Animalia
- Phylum: Chordata
- Class: Actinopterygii
- Order: Cypriniformes
- Family: Danionidae
- Subfamily: Chedrinae
- Genus: Salmostoma
- Species: S. orissaensis

Binomial name
- Salmostoma orissaensis Bănărescu, 1968

Synonyms
- Salmophasia orissaensis (Bănărescu, 1968)

Species of fish

The Orissa razorbelly minnow (Salmophasia orissaensis) is a species of cyprinid fish in the genus Salmophasia.
