= Thynnichthys vaillanti =

Conservation status
- Least Concern (IUCN 3.1)

Scientific classification
- Kingdom: Animalia
- Phylum: Chordata
- Class: Actinopterygii
- Order: Cypriniformes
- Family: Cyprinidae
- Genus: Thynnichthys
- Species: T. vaillanti

Binomial name
- Thynnichthys vaillanti Weber & de Beaufort, 1916

Species of fish

Thynnichthys vaillanti is a species of cyprinid of the genus Thynnichthys. It inhabits rivers in eastern Borneo. Described by Max Carl Wilhelm Weber and Lieven Ferdinand de Beaufort in 1916, it has a maximum length among unsexed males of 26.4 centimetres (10.4 in) and is considered harmless to humans.

== Etymology ==
The fish is named in honor of French zoologist Léon Vaillant.
