= Salmostoma belachi =

Conservation status
- Vulnerable (IUCN 3.1)

Scientific classification
- Kingdom: Animalia
- Phylum: Chordata
- Class: Actinopterygii
- Order: Cypriniformes
- Family: Danionidae
- Subfamily: Chedrinae
- Genus: Salmostoma
- Species: S. belachi

Binomial name
- Salmostoma belachi Jayaraj, Krishna Rao, Ravichandra Reddy, Shakuntala & Devaraj, 1999

Synonyms
- Salmophasia belachi (Jayaraj, Krishna Rao, Ravichandra Reddy, Shakuntala & Devara)

Species of fish

Salmostoma belachi is a species of ray-finned fish in the genus Salmostoma.
