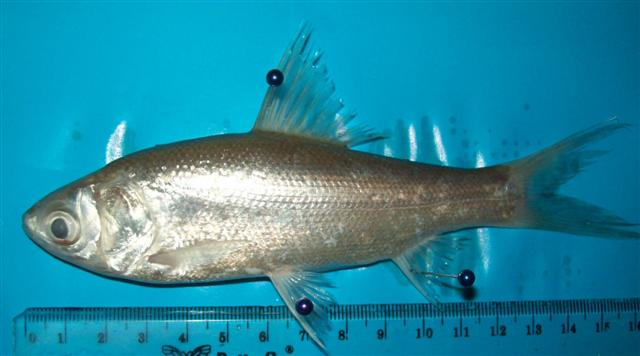

Conservation status
- Least Concern (IUCN 3.1)

Scientific classification
- Kingdom: Animalia
- Phylum: Chordata
- Class: Actinopterygii
- Order: Cypriniformes
- Family: Cyprinidae
- Genus: Thynnichthys
- Species: T. thynnoides

Binomial name
- Thynnichthys thynnoides (Bleeker, 1852)

Synonyms
- Leuciscus thynnoides Bleeker, 1852; Thynnichthys thai Fowler, 1937

= Thynnichthys thynnoides =

Species of fish

Thynnichthys thynnoides is a species of fish in the family Cyprinidae from mainland southeast Asia and the islands of Borneo and Sumatra.

== Habitat ==
It is found in freshwater habitats.

== Dispersion ==
Thynnichthys thynnoides is found in the Mekong and Chao Phraya river basins and possibly the Mae Klong River. It is a potamodromous fish.
