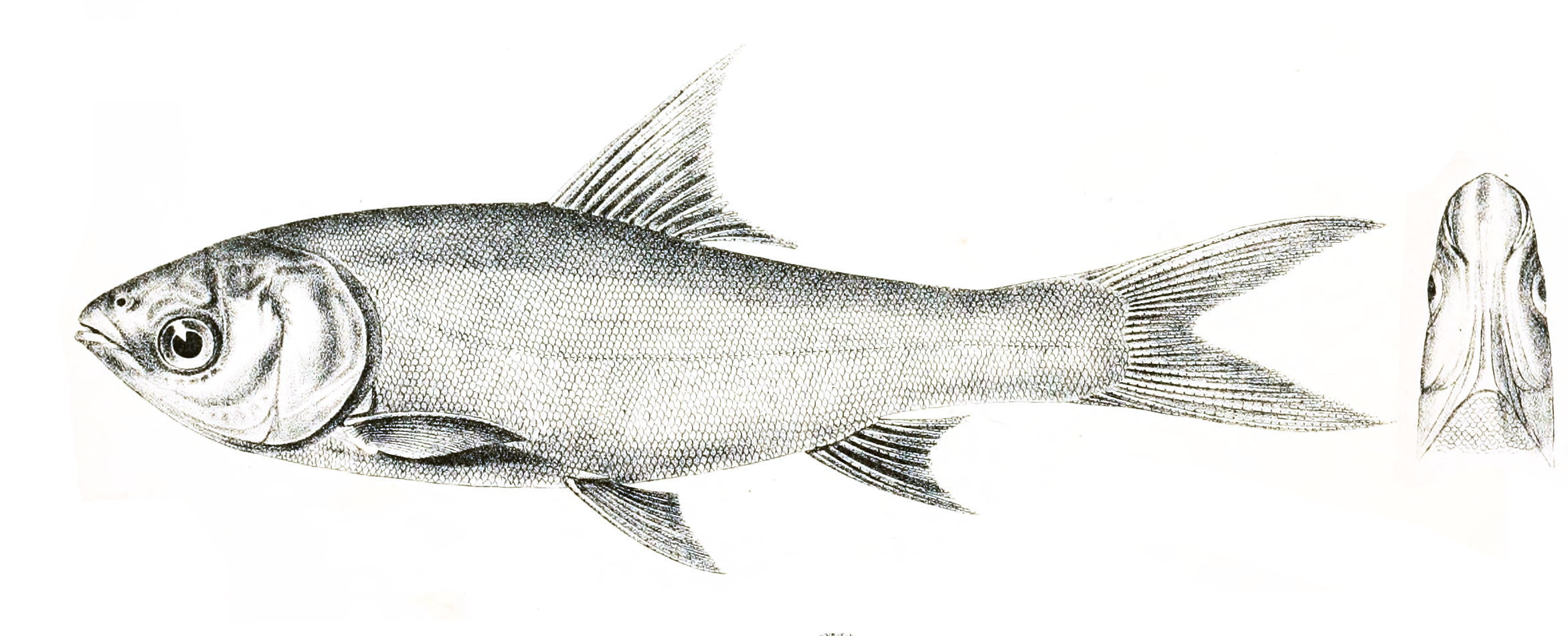
- Thynnichthys sandkhol

Scientific classification
- Kingdom: Animalia
- Phylum: Chordata
- Class: Actinopterygii
- Order: Cypriniformes
- Family: Cyprinidae
- Subfamily: Labeoninae
- Genus: Thynnichthys; Bleeker, 1860

Type species
- Leuciscus thynnoides Bleeker, 1852

Synonyms
- Thynnichthyina Fowler, 1937

= Thynnichthys =

Genus of fishes

Thynnichthys is a genus of freshwater ray-finned fish belonging to the family Cyprinidae, the family which also includes the carps, barbs, minnows and related fishes. The fishes in this genus are found in southern Asia from India to Borneo.

== Species ==
Thynnichthys contains the following species:

- Thynnichthys polylepis Bleeker, 1860
- Thynnichthys sandkhol (Sykes, 1839) (Sandkhol carp)
- Thynnichthys thynnoides (Bleeker, 1852)
- Thynnichthys vaillanti M. C. W. Weber & de Beaufort, 1916
