= Thynnichthys polylepis =

Conservation status
- Least Concern (IUCN 3.1)

Scientific classification
- Kingdom: Animalia
- Phylum: Chordata
- Class: Actinopterygii
- Order: Cypriniformes
- Family: Cyprinidae
- Genus: Thynnichthys
- Species: T. polylepis

Binomial name
- Thynnichthys polylepis Bleeker, 1860

Species of fish

Thynnichthys polylepis is a species of cyprinid of the genus Thynnichthys. It inhabits Sumatra and Borneo. It has a maximum length among unsexed males of 18.0 centimetres (7.1 in). Described in 1860 by Pieter Bleeker, it is considered harmless to humans.
