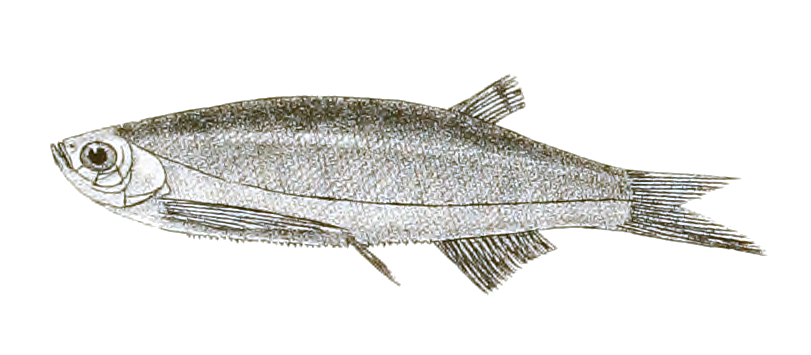

Scientific classification
- Kingdom: Animalia
- Phylum: Chordata
- Class: Actinopterygii
- Order: Cypriniformes
- Family: Danionidae
- Subfamily: Chedrinae
- Genus: Salmostoma
- Species: S. punjabense

Binomial name
- Salmostoma punjabense F. Day, 1872

Synonyms
- Salmophasia punjabensis (Day, 1872)

= Punjab razorbelly minnow =

Species of fish

The Punjab razorbelly minnow (Salmostoma punjabense) is a species of ray-finned fish in the genus Salmostoma. It is endemic to Pakistan (Indus plains)
