= Osteochilichthys =

Scientific classification
- Kingdom: Animalia
- Phylum: Chordata
- Class: Actinopterygii
- Order: Cypriniformes
- Family: Cyprinidae
- Subfamily: Torinae
- Genus: Osteochilichthys; Hora, 1942

Type species
- Scaphiodon thomassi Day, 1877

Genus of fishes

Osteochilichthys is a small genus of cyprinid fishes. It is endemic to southern India.

== Species ==
The following species are included within this genus:

- Osteochilichthys augraoides (Jerdon, 1849)
- Osteochilichthys elegans Plamoottil, 2022 (Plamoottil's barb)
- Osteochilichthys formosus Plamoottil & Vineeth, 2022 (Charming barb)
- Osteochilichthys longidorsalis Pethiyagoda & Kottelat, 1994
- Osteochilichthys nashii (Day, 1869) (Nash's barb)
- Osteochilichthys thomassi (Day, 1877) (Konti barb)
