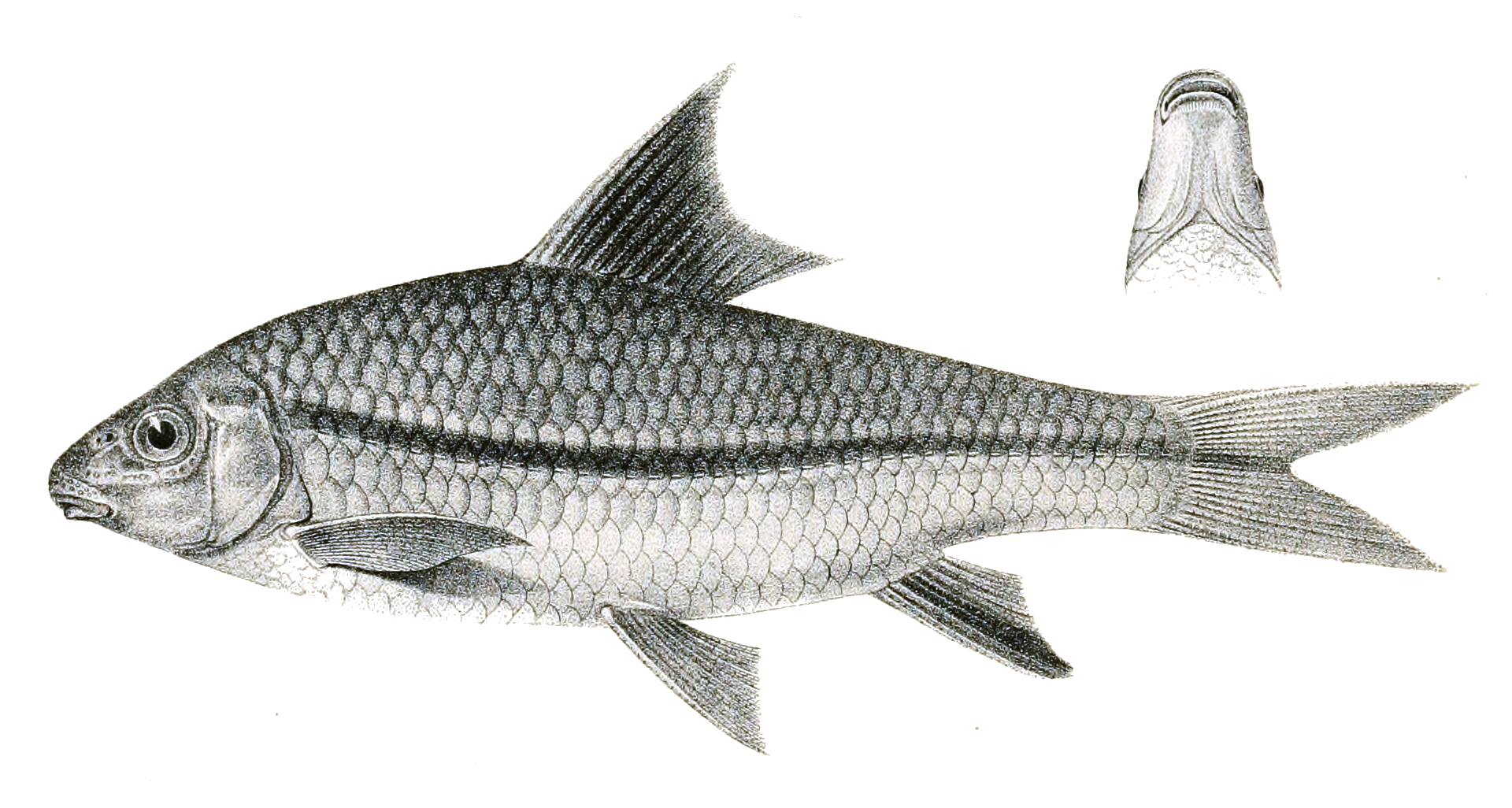

Conservation status
- Least Concern (IUCN 3.1)

Scientific classification
- Kingdom: Animalia
- Phylum: Chordata
- Class: Actinopterygii
- Order: Cypriniformes
- Family: Cyprinidae
- Subfamily: Torinae
- Genus: Osteochilichthys
- Species: O. nashii

Binomial name
- Osteochilichthys nashii (Day, 1869)

Synonyms
- Barbus nashii Day, 1869; Cyprinion nashii (Day, 1869); Labeo nashii (Day, 1869); Osteochilus nashii (Day, 1869); Scaphiodon nashii (Day, 1869); Osteochilus malabaricus Day, 1873; Osteochilichthys godavariensis Babu Rao, 1977; Osteocheilus godavariensis (Babu Rao, 1977); Osteochilus godavariensis (Babu Rao, 1977)

= Osteochilichthys nashii =

Species of fish

Osteochilichthys nashii, Nash's barb, is a species of freshwater ray-finned fish belonging to the family Cyprinidae, the family which includes the carps, barbs, minnows and allies. This fish is endemic to the Western Ghats in Kerala and Karnataka in southern India.
