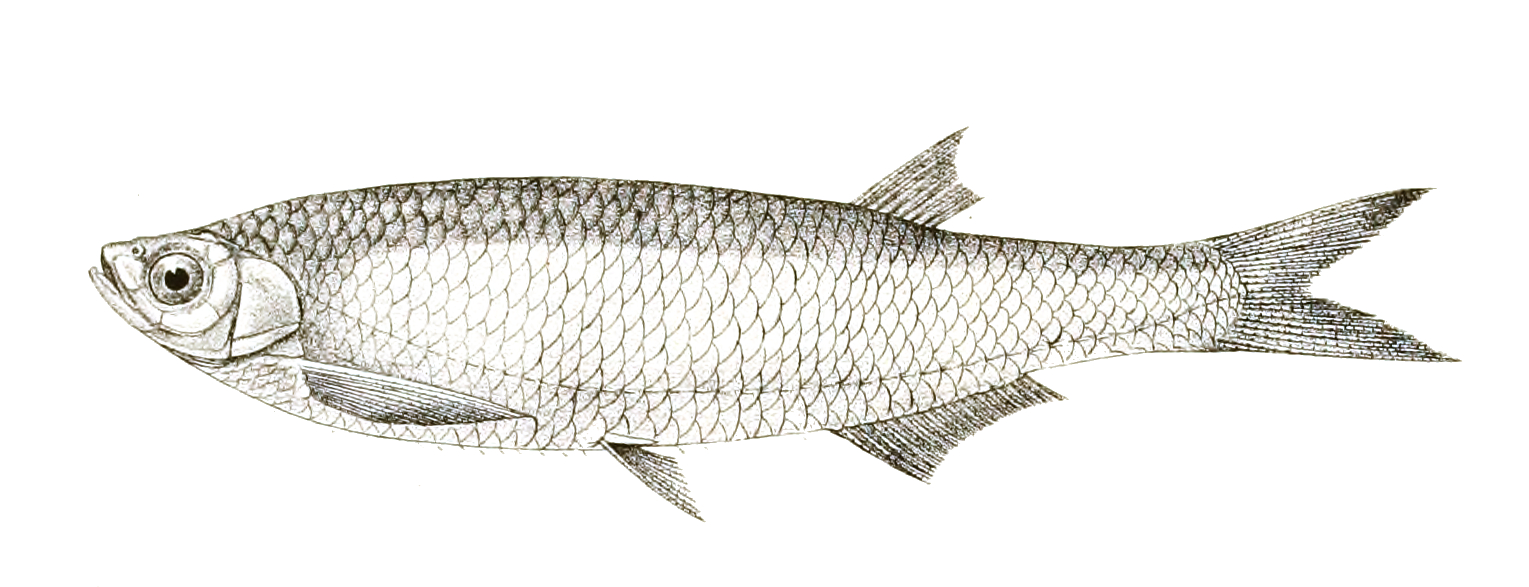

Conservation status
- Least Concern (IUCN 3.1)

Scientific classification
- Kingdom: Animalia
- Phylum: Chordata
- Class: Actinopterygii
- Order: Cypriniformes
- Family: Danionidae
- Genus: Salmostoma
- Species: S. sardinella

Binomial name
- Salmostoma sardinella (Valenciennes, 1844)

Synonyms
- Leuciscus sardinella Valenciennes, 1844; Chela sardinella (Valenciennes, 1844); Salmophasia sardinella (Valenciennes, 1844)

= Sardinella razorbelly minnow =

Species of fish

The Sardinella razorbelly minnow (Salmostoma sardinella) is a species of ray-finned fish in the genus Salmostoma. It occurs in the lower reaches of rivers in India, Bangladesh and Myanmar.
