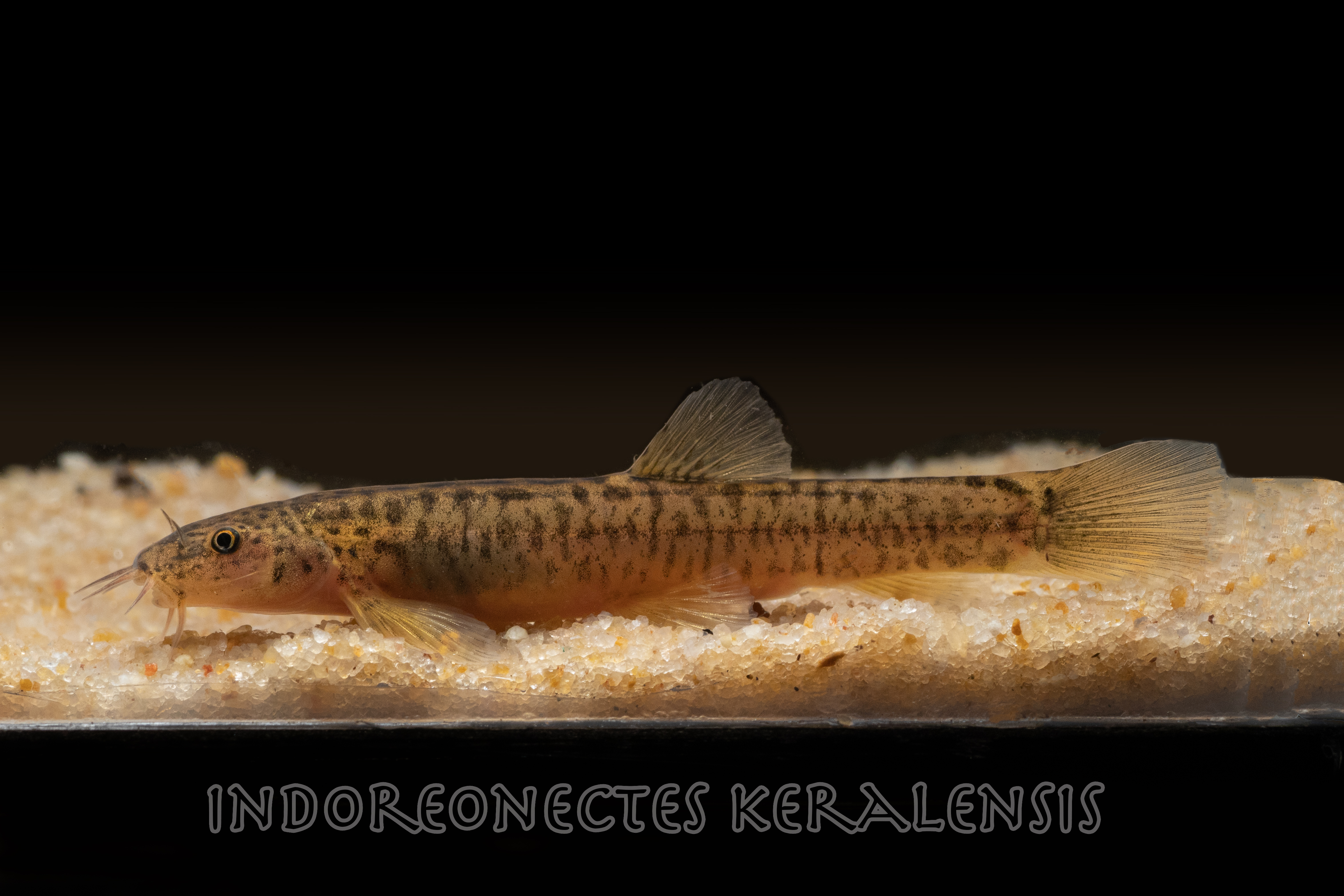

Scientific classification
- Domain: Eukaryota
- Kingdom: Animalia
- Phylum: Chordata
- Class: Actinopterygii
- Order: Cypriniformes
- Family: Nemacheilidae
- Genus: Indoreonectes
- Species: I. keralensis

Binomial name
- Indoreonectes keralensis (Rita & Nalbant, 1978)

Synonyms
- Oreonectes keralensis Rita, Banarescu & Nalbant, 1978; Noemacheilus keralensis (Rita, Banarescu & Nalbant, 1978); Nemacheilus keralensis (Rita, Banarescu & Nalbant, 1978)

= Indoreonectes keralensis =

Species of fish

Indoreonectes keralensis is a species of ray-finned fish in the genus Indoreonectes. This small stone loach is endemic to streams in the Western Ghats of India.
