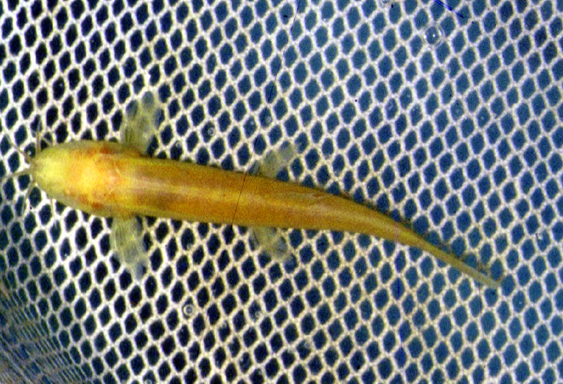
- Indoreonectes evezardi from the cave-adapted population

Scientific classification
- Kingdom: Animalia
- Phylum: Chordata
- Class: Actinopterygii
- Division: Teleostei
- Order: Cypriniformes
- Family: Nemacheilidae
- Genus: Indoreonectes; Rita & Nalbant, 1978

Type species
- Oreonectes (Indoreonectes) keralensis Rita & Nalbant 1978

= Indoreonectes =

Genus of fishes

Indoreonectes is a genus of stone loaches native to the Western Ghats in India.

== Species ==
Indoreonectes contains the following valid species:

- Indoreonectes amrabad Jadhav, Karuthapandi, Jaiawal, Shankar, Dinesh, Raghunathan & Banerjee, 2024
- Indoreonectes evezardi (Day, 1872)
- Indoreonectes kalsubai Jadhav, Karuthapandi, Jaiawal, Shankar, Dinesh, Raghunathan & Banerjee, 2024
- Indoreonectes keralensis (Rita & Nalbant, 1978)
- Indoreonectes mahadeoensis Ghosh, Bhat & Johnson, 2025
- Indoreonectes neeleshi Kumkar, Pise, Gorule, Verma & Kalous, 2021
- Indoreonectes rajeevi Kumkar, Pise, Gorule, Verma & Kalous, 2021
- Indoreonectes radhanagari Jadhav, Karuthapandi, Jaiawal, Shankar, Dinesh, Raghunathan & Banerjee, 2024
- Indoreonectes telanganaensis Prasad, C. Srinivasulu, A. Srinivasulu, Anoop & Dahanukar, 2020
