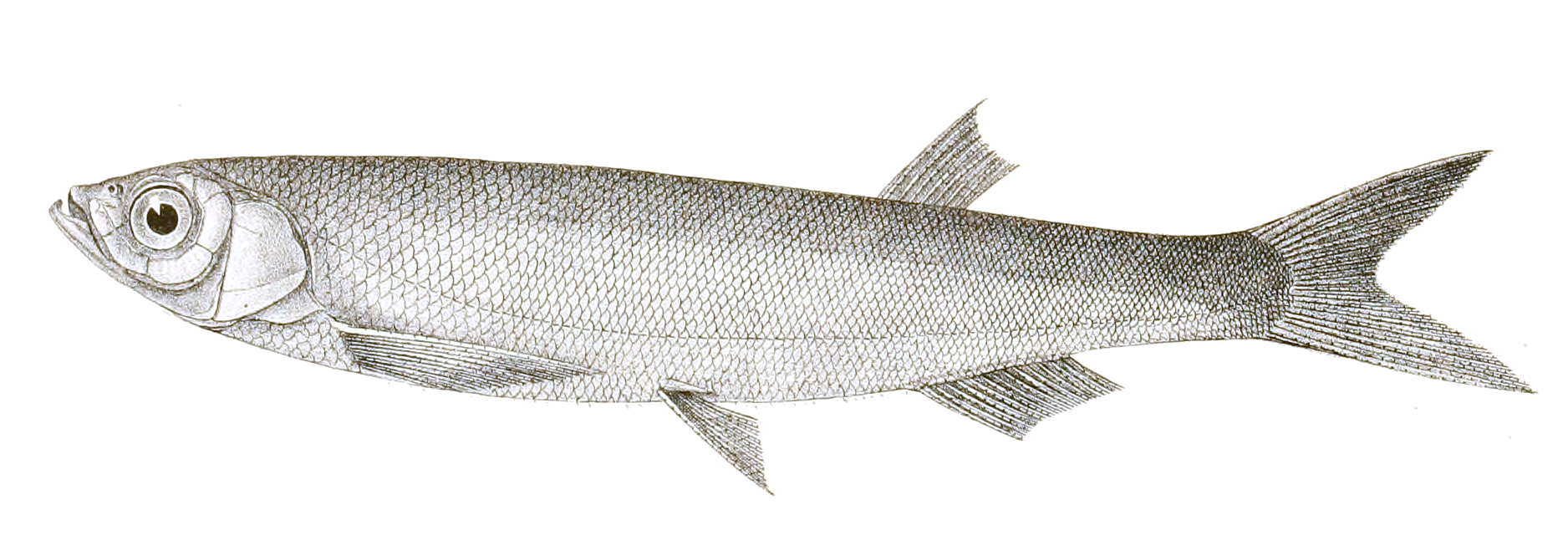

Conservation status
- Least Concern (IUCN 3.1)

Scientific classification
- Kingdom: Animalia
- Phylum: Chordata
- Class: Actinopterygii
- Order: Cypriniformes
- Family: Danionidae
- Genus: Salmostoma
- Species: S. bacaila

Binomial name
- Salmostoma bacaila (F. Hamilton, 1822)

Synonyms
- Cyprinus bacaila Hamilton, 1822; Chela bacaila (Hamilton, 1822); Leuciscus bacaila (Hamilton, 1822); Opsarius bacaila (Hamilton, 1822); Oxygaster bacaila (Hamilton, 1822); Salmophasia bacaila (Hamilton, 1822); Opsarius leucerus McClelland, 1839; Cyprinus oblonga Swainson, 1839; Salmophasia oblonga (Swainson, 1839)

= Large razorbelly minnow =

Species of fish

The large razorbelly minnow (Salmostoma bacaila) is one of thirteen species of ray-finned fish in the genus Salmostoma.
