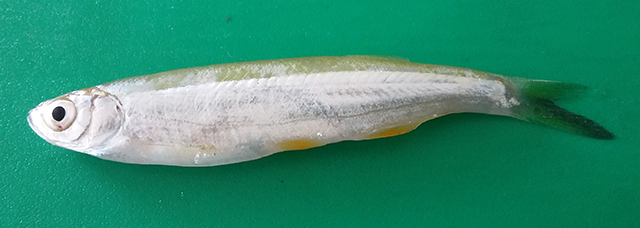

Conservation status
- Least Concern (IUCN 3.1)

Scientific classification
- Kingdom: Animalia
- Phylum: Chordata
- Class: Actinopterygii
- Order: Cypriniformes
- Family: Danionidae
- Subfamily: Chedrinae
- Genus: Salmostoma
- Species: S. phulo

Binomial name
- Salmostoma phulo (F. Hamilton, 1822)

= Finescale razorbelly minnow =

Species of fish

The finescale razorbelly minnow (Salmostoma phulo) is a species of ray-finned fish in the genus Salmostoma. It is a species of freshwater fish native to Bangladesh and throughout India. It lives in the lower reaches of various bodies of water including rivers, canals, ponds, and ditches. With a maximum length of only 12 centimetres (4.7 in), the fish is of little commercial or dietary value to humans.
