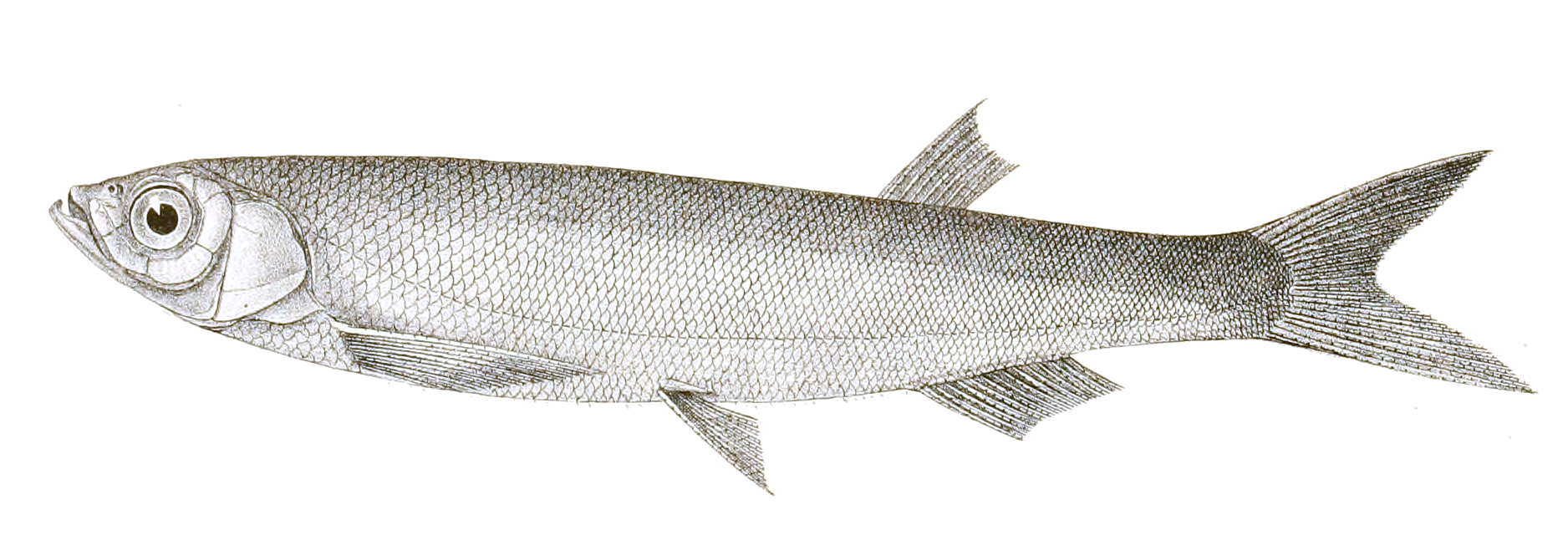
- Salmostoma bacaila

Scientific classification
- Kingdom: Animalia
- Phylum: Chordata
- Class: Actinopterygii
- Order: Cypriniformes
- Family: Danionidae
- Subfamily: Chedrinae
- Genus: Salmostoma; Swainson, 1839

Type species
- Cyprinus oblongus Swainson, 1839

Species
- 13 See text

Synonyms
- Salmophasia Swainson, 1839

= Razorbelly minnow =

Genus of fishes

The razorbelly minnows are a group of fish in the genus Salmostoma found in southern Asia. They have been placed in the genus Salmophasia but this is regarded as a junior synonym of Salmostoma.

== Species ==
There are currently 13 recognized species in this genus:

Species	Common name	Image
Salmostoma acinaces (Valenciennes, 1844)	silver razorbelly minnow	
Salmostoma bacaila (F. Hamilton, 1822)	large razorbelly minnow	
Salmostoma balookee (Sykes, 1839)	Bloch razorbelly minnow	
Salmostoma belachi (Jayaraj, Krishna Rao, Ravichandra Reddy, Shakuntala & Devaraj, 1999)		
Salmostoma boopis (F. Day, 1874)	Boopis razorbelly minnow	
Salmostoma horai (Silas, 1951)	Hora razorbelly minnow	
Salmostoma novacula (Valenciennes, 1840)	Novacula razorbelly minnow	
Salmostoma orissaensis (Bănărescu, 1968)	Orissa razorbelly minnow	
Salmostoma phulo (F. Hamilton, 1822)	finescale razorbelly minnow	
Salmostoma punjabense (F. Day, 1872)	Punjab razorbelly minnow	
Salmostoma sardinella (Valenciennes, 1844)	Sardinella razorbelly minnow	
Salmostoma sladoni (F. Day, 1870)		
Salmostoma untrahi (F. Day, 1869)	Mahanadi razorbelly minnow	
