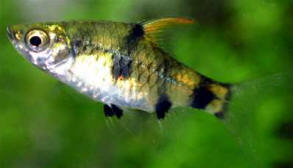

Conservation status
- Least Concern (IUCN 3.1)

Scientific classification
- Kingdom: Animalia
- Phylum: Chordata
- Class: Actinopterygii
- Order: Cypriniformes
- Family: Cyprinidae
- Subfamily: Smiliogastrinae
- Genus: Pethia
- Species: P. gelius

Binomial name
- Pethia gelius (F. Hamilton, 1822)

Synonyms
- Barbus gelius (F. Hamilton, 1822); Cyprinus gelius F. Hamilton, 1822; Puntius gelius (F. Hamilton, 1822); Systomus gelius (F. Hamilton, 1822)

= Golden barb =

Species of fish

The golden barb or golden dwarf barb (Pethia gelius) is a species of cyprinid fish native to inland waters in Asia, and is found in Pakistan, India, and Bangladesh. It has also been introduced to waters in Colombia. It natively inhabits rivers, and standing water with a silty bottom. They live in a tropical climate in water with a 6.0 - 6.5 pH, a water hardness of 8–15 dGH, and a temperature range of 68–77 °F (20–25 °C). It feeds on benthic and planktonic crustaceans, and insects. This species can grow in length up to 5.1 centimetres (2.0 in) TL. It can also be found in the aquarium trade.

The golden barb is an open water, substrate egg-scatterer, and adults do not guard the eggs. They primarily spawn in shallow water.

== See also ==
- List of freshwater aquarium fish species
