= Novacula razorbelly minnow =

Conservation status
- Least Concern (IUCN 3.1)

Scientific classification
- Kingdom: Animalia
- Phylum: Chordata
- Class: Actinopterygii
- Order: Cypriniformes
- Family: Danionidae
- Subfamily: Chedrinae
- Genus: Salmostoma
- Species: S. novacula

Binomial name
- Salmostoma novacula (Valenciennes, 1840)

Synonyms
- Cyprinus novacula Valenciennes, 1840; Leuciscus novacula (Valenciennes, 1840); Salmophasia novacula (Valenciennes, 1840); Salmostoma longicauda Srithar & Jayaram, 1990

Species of fish

The novacula razorbelly minnow (Salmostoma novacula) is a species of ray-finned fish in the genus Salmostoma.
