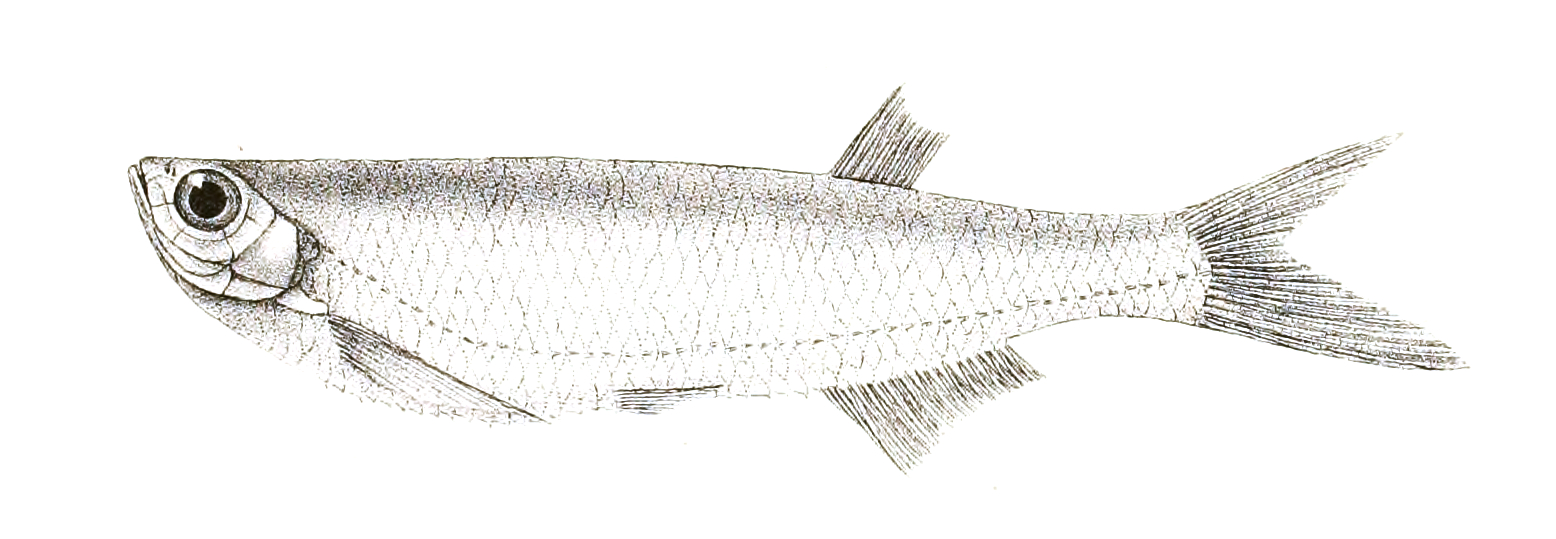

Conservation status
- Least Concern (IUCN 3.1)

Scientific classification
- Kingdom: Animalia
- Phylum: Chordata
- Class: Actinopterygii
- Division: Teleostei
- Order: Cypriniformes
- Family: Danionidae
- Genus: Salmostoma
- Species: S. untrahi

Binomial name
- Salmostoma untrahi (F. Day, 1869)

Synonyms
- Chela untrahi Day, 1869; Salmophasia untrahi (Day, 1869)

= Mahanadi razorbelly minnow =

Species of fish

The Mahanadi razorbelly minnow (Salmostoma untrahi) is a species of ray-finned fish in the genus Salmostoma.
