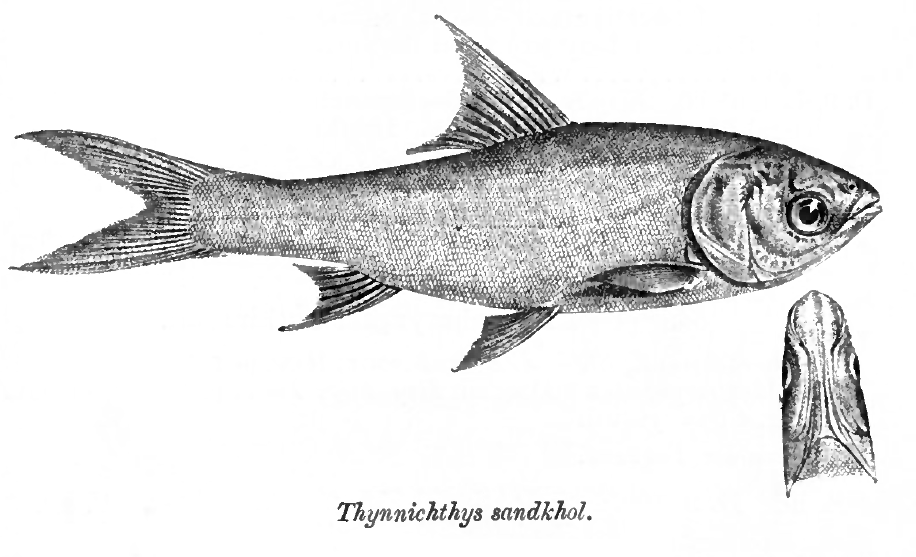

Conservation status
- Endangered (IUCN 3.1)

Scientific classification
- Kingdom: Animalia
- Phylum: Chordata
- Class: Actinopterygii
- Order: Cypriniformes
- Family: Cyprinidae
- Genus: Thynnichthys
- Species: T. sandkhol

Binomial name
- Thynnichthys sandkhol (Sykes, 1839)

Synonyms
- Leuciscus sandkhol Sykes, 1839

= Thynnichthys sandkhol =

Species of fish

Thynnichthys sandkhol, the Sandkhol carp, is a species of cyprinid of the genus Thynnichthys. It inhabits the Krishna River and Godavari River in India. Described in 1839 by William Henry Sykes (as Leuciscus sandkhol), it is classified as "endangered" on the IUCN Red List, and its population is declining. It has a maximum length among unsexed males of 46.0 centimetres (18.1 in) and is considered harmless to humans.
