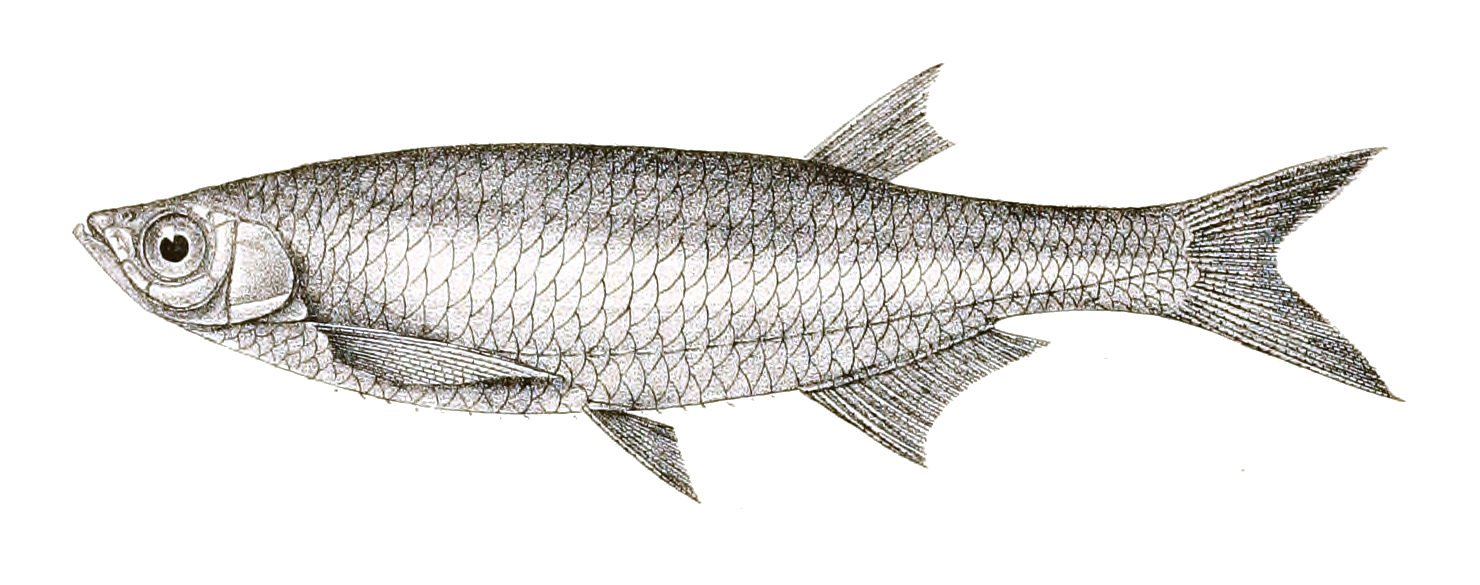

Conservation status
- Least Concern (IUCN 3.1)

Scientific classification
- Kingdom: Animalia
- Phylum: Chordata
- Class: Actinopterygii
- Order: Cypriniformes
- Family: Danionidae
- Genus: Salmostoma
- Species: S. acinaces

Binomial name
- Salmostoma acinaces Valenciennes, 1844

Synonyms
- Chela argentea Day, 1867; Oxygaster argentea Day, 1867; Salmophasia acinaces (Valenciennes, 1844); Leuciscus acinaces Valenciennes, 1844

= Silver razorbelly minnow =

Species of fish

The silver razorbelly minnow (Salmostoma acinaces) known as "Chela Maach" in Bengali is a species of ray-finned fish in the carp family, Cyprinidae. It is native to India, where it occurs in many river systems. It has also been reported from Bangladesh.
