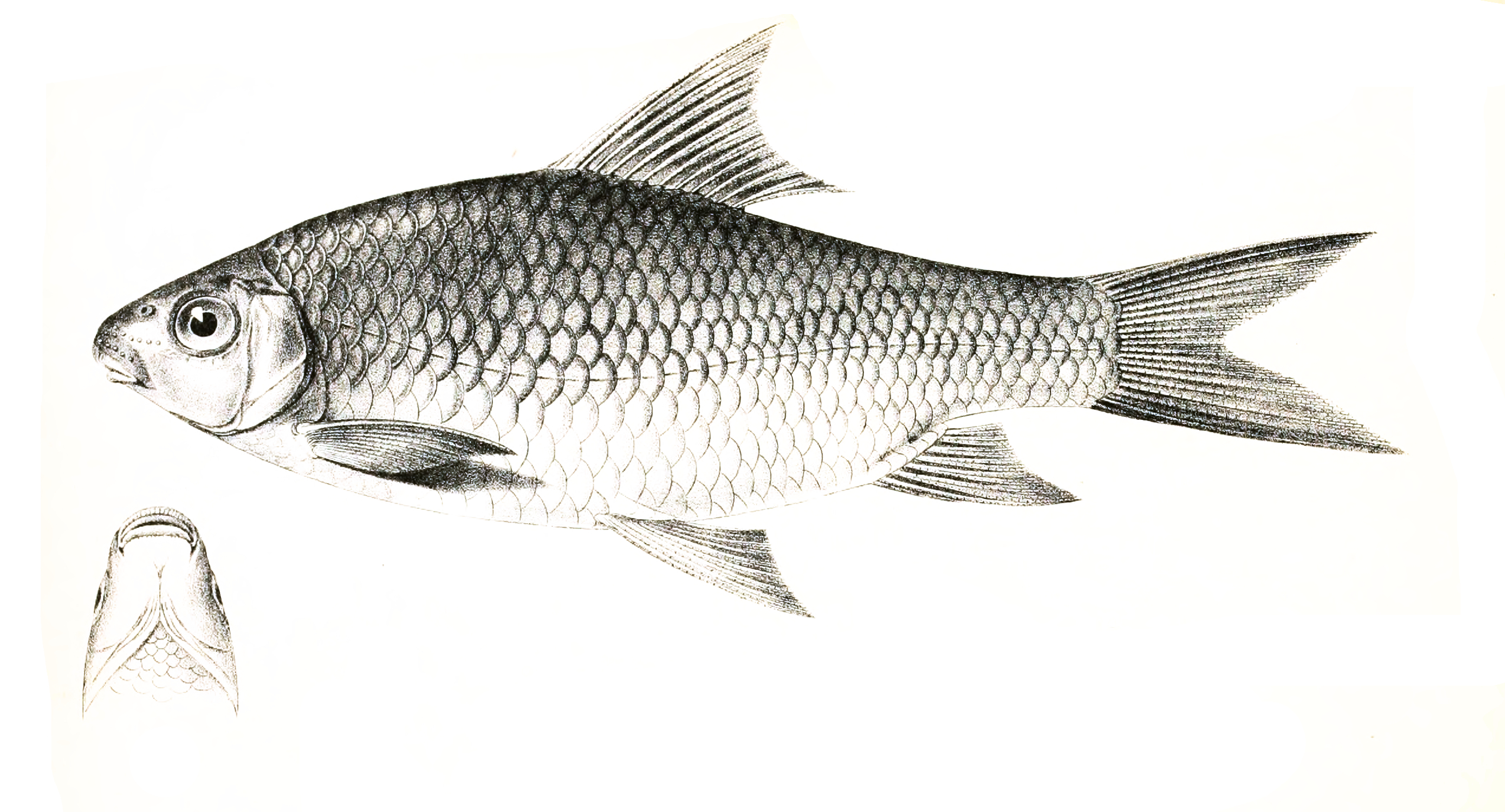

Conservation status
- Least Concern (IUCN 3.1)

Scientific classification
- Kingdom: Animalia
- Phylum: Chordata
- Class: Actinopterygii
- Order: Cypriniformes
- Family: Cyprinidae
- Subfamily: Torinae
- Genus: Osteochilichthys
- Species: O. thomassi

Binomial name
- Osteochilichthys thomassi (F. Day, 1877)

Synonyms
- Osteochilus thomassi; Scaphiodon thomassi

= Konti barb =

Species of fish

The Konti barb (Osteochilichthys thomassi) is a species of cyprinid fish endemic to the Western Ghats, India. It inhabits large streams.
