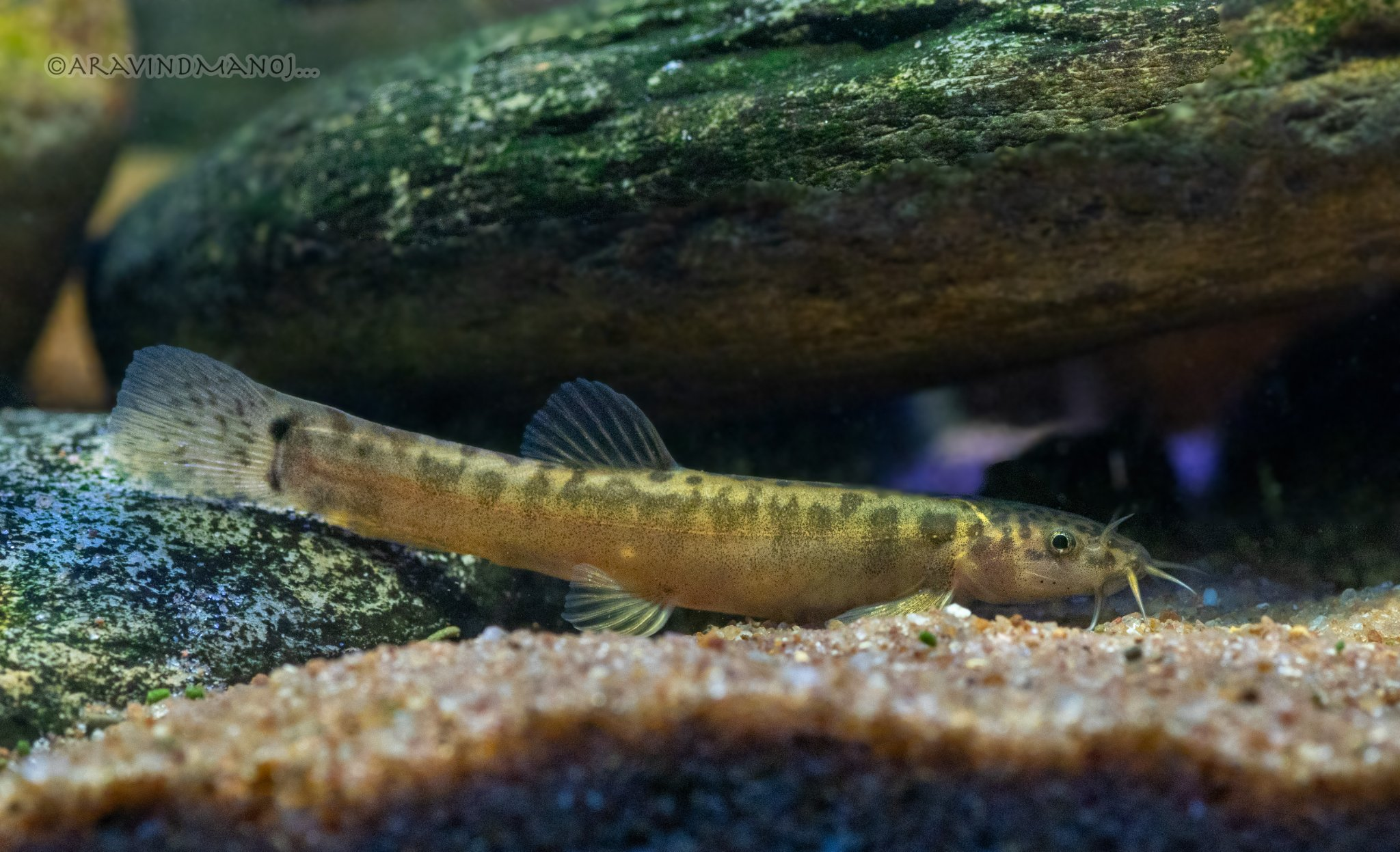
- Collected individual from Sileru River

Scientific classification
- Domain: Eukaryota
- Kingdom: Animalia
- Phylum: Chordata
- Class: Actinopterygii
- Order: Cypriniformes
- Family: Nemacheilidae
- Genus: Indoreonectes
- Species: I. telanganaensis

Binomial name
- Indoreonectes telanganaensis Prasad, C. Srinivasulu, A. Srinivasulu, Anoop & Dahanukar, 2020

= Indoreonectes telanganaensis =

Species of fish

Indoreonectes telanganaensis is a species of stone loach found in southern India. It was found in a stream locally known as "Maisamma Loddi" flowing from the mountains of Kawal Tiger Reserve. It was named after the state of Telangana and it is the first vertebrate named after Telangana. It grows up to 2 inches.
