= Salmostoma balookee =

Conservation status
- Least Concern (IUCN 3.1)

Scientific classification
- Kingdom: Animalia
- Phylum: Chordata
- Class: Actinopterygii
- Order: Cypriniformes
- Family: Danionidae
- Subfamily: Chedrinae
- Genus: Salmostoma
- Species: S. balookee

Binomial name
- Salmostoma balookee (Sykes, 1839)

Synonyms
- Chela balookee Sykes, 1839; Chela teekanee Sykes, 1839; Cyprinus clupeoides Bloch, 1795; Chela clupeoides (Bloch, 1795); Leusiscus clupeoides (Bloch, 1795); Oxygaster clupeoides (Bloch, 1795); Salmostoma clupeoides (Bloch, 1795); Leuciscus teekanee (Sykes, 1839); Perilampus teekanee (Sykes, 1839); Leuciscus dussumieri Valenciennes, 1844; Pelecus affinis Jerdon, 1849; Salmostoma kardahiensis Reddiah, 1980

Species of fish

Salmostoma balookee, the Bloch razorbelly minnow or Reddiah razorbelly minnow, is a species of cyprinid fish in the genus Salmostoma. It is distributed in India and Myanmar.
