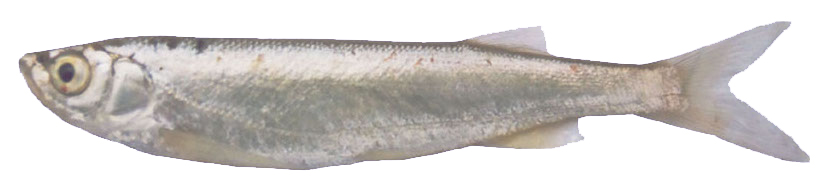
- Salmostoma horai

Conservation status
- Vulnerable (IUCN 3.1)

Scientific classification
- Kingdom: Animalia
- Phylum: Chordata
- Class: Actinopterygii
- Order: Cypriniformes
- Family: Danionidae
- Subfamily: Chedrinae
- Genus: Salmostoma
- Species: S. horai

Binomial name
- Salmostoma horai (Silas, 1951)

Synonyms
- Chela horai Silas, 1951; Salmophasia horai (Silas, 1951)

= Hora razorbelly minnow =

Species of fish

The Hora razorbelly minnow or Hora's razorbelly minnow (Salmostoma horai) is a species of ray-finned fish in the genus Salmostoma.

== Etymology ==
The fish is named in honor of Indian ichthyologist Sunder Lal Hora (1896–1955), the Director, of the Zoological Survey of India.
