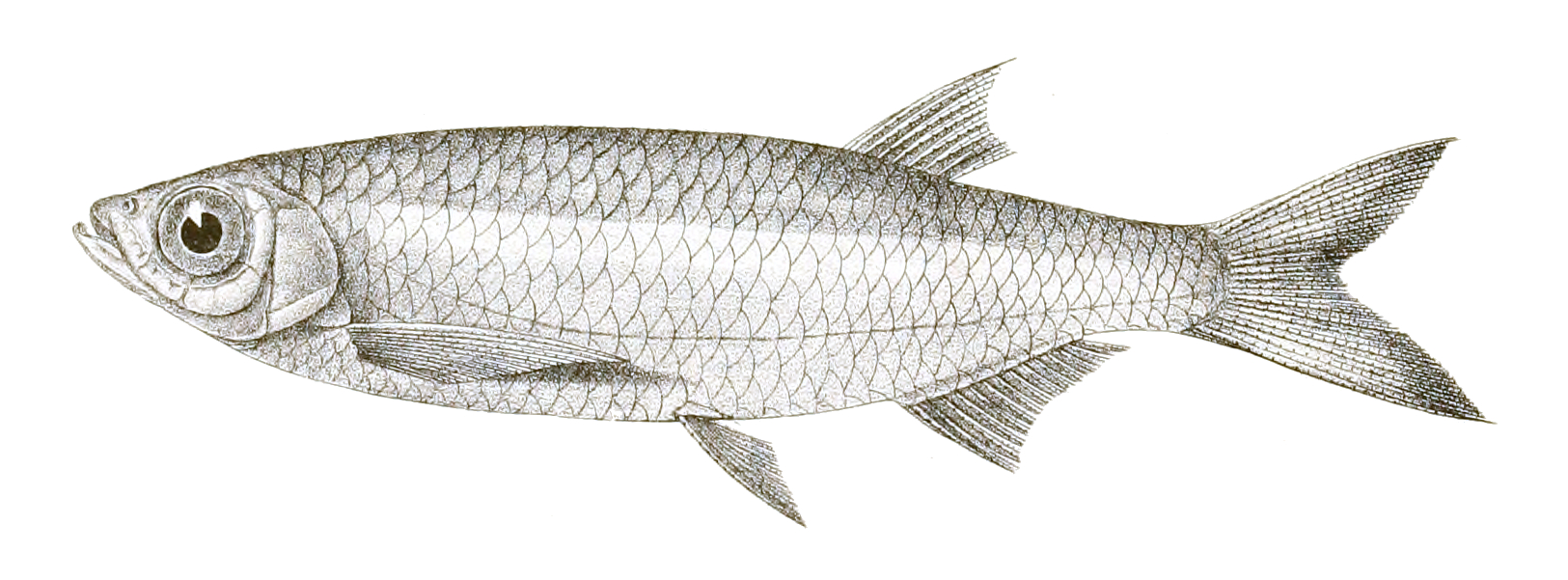

Conservation status
- Least Concern (IUCN 3.1)

Scientific classification
- Kingdom: Animalia
- Phylum: Chordata
- Class: Actinopterygii
- Order: Cypriniformes
- Family: Danionidae
- Genus: Salmostoma
- Species: S. boopis

Binomial name
- Salmostoma boopis (F. Day, 1874)

Synonyms
- Chela boopis Day, 1874; Oxygaster boopis (Day, 1874); Salmophasia boopis (Day, 1874)

= Boopis razorbelly minnow =

Species of fish

The boopis razorbelly minnow (Salmostoma boopis) is a species of cyprinid fish in the genus Salmostoma. It is widespread throughout the Western Ghats of India
