= Fish in Meitei culture =

Overview of fish in Meitei civilization

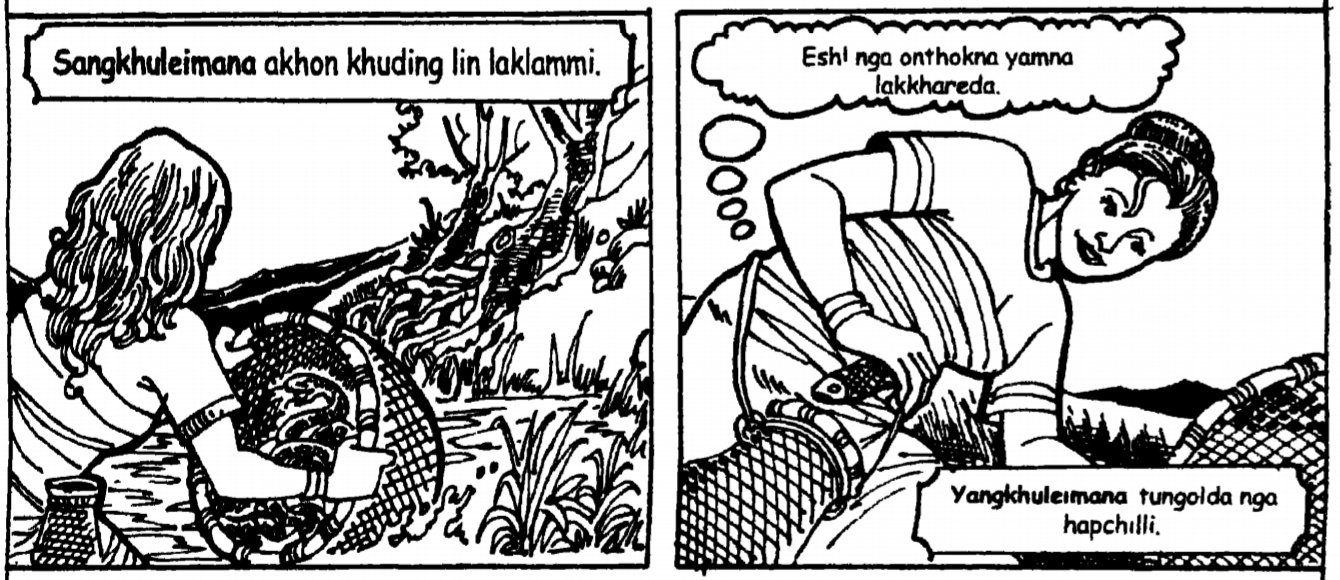
Co-wives catching fish and other creatures in the Meitei folktale of Sandrembi Chaisra

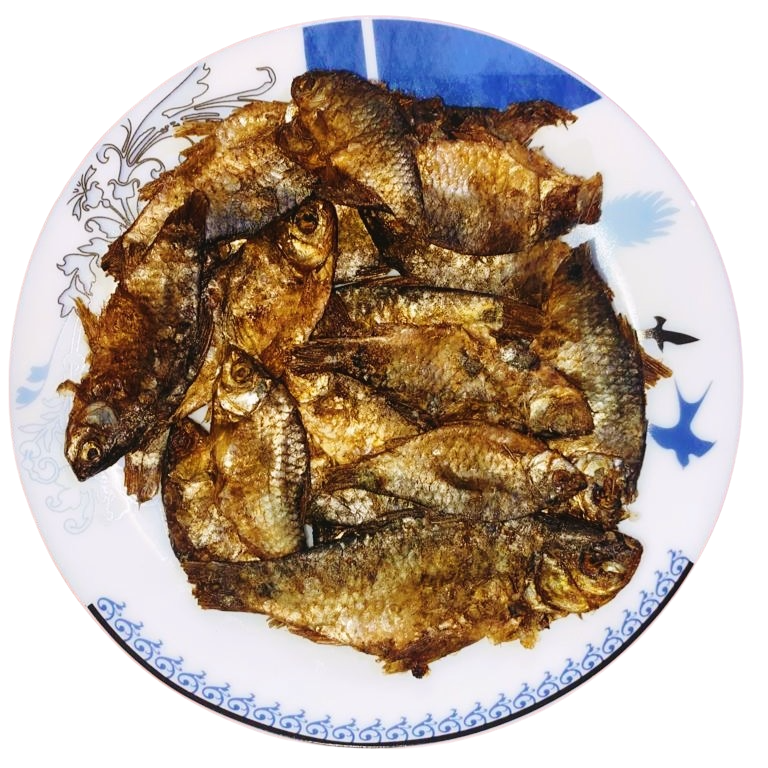
Ngari, a food made of fermented fish, is a part of Meitei cuisine.

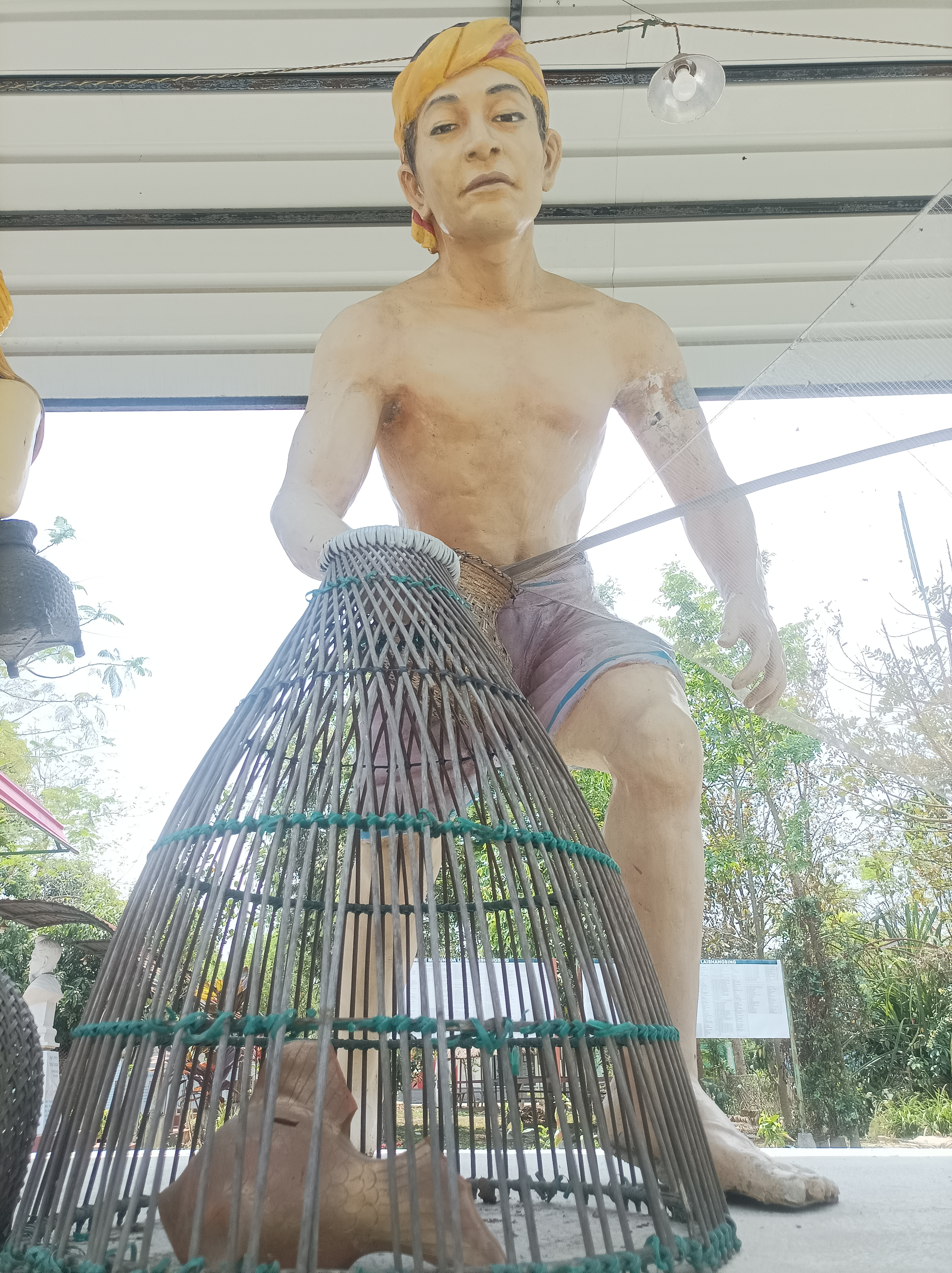
A figure of an ancient Meitei fisherman trying to catch fish using a traditional Meitei wooden (bamboo) basket like cage (known as "long-oop" or "long-up") in Menjor Multipurpose Research Centre and Unity Park

In Meitei culture, fish are very important and symbolize wealth, life, and nature's balance. Fish are a key part of their food and traditional dishes. They also appear in stories, festivals, and rituals, showing their deep connection to nature and the water life of Manipur and other Meitei populated areas of Assam, Tripura as well as in Bangladesh and Myanmar. Among its numerous names, fish is commonly known as ꯉꯥ, nga or ꯂꯦꯝꯂꯩ, lemlei in the Meitei language (also known as Manipuri).

== As food ==
=== In cuisine ===
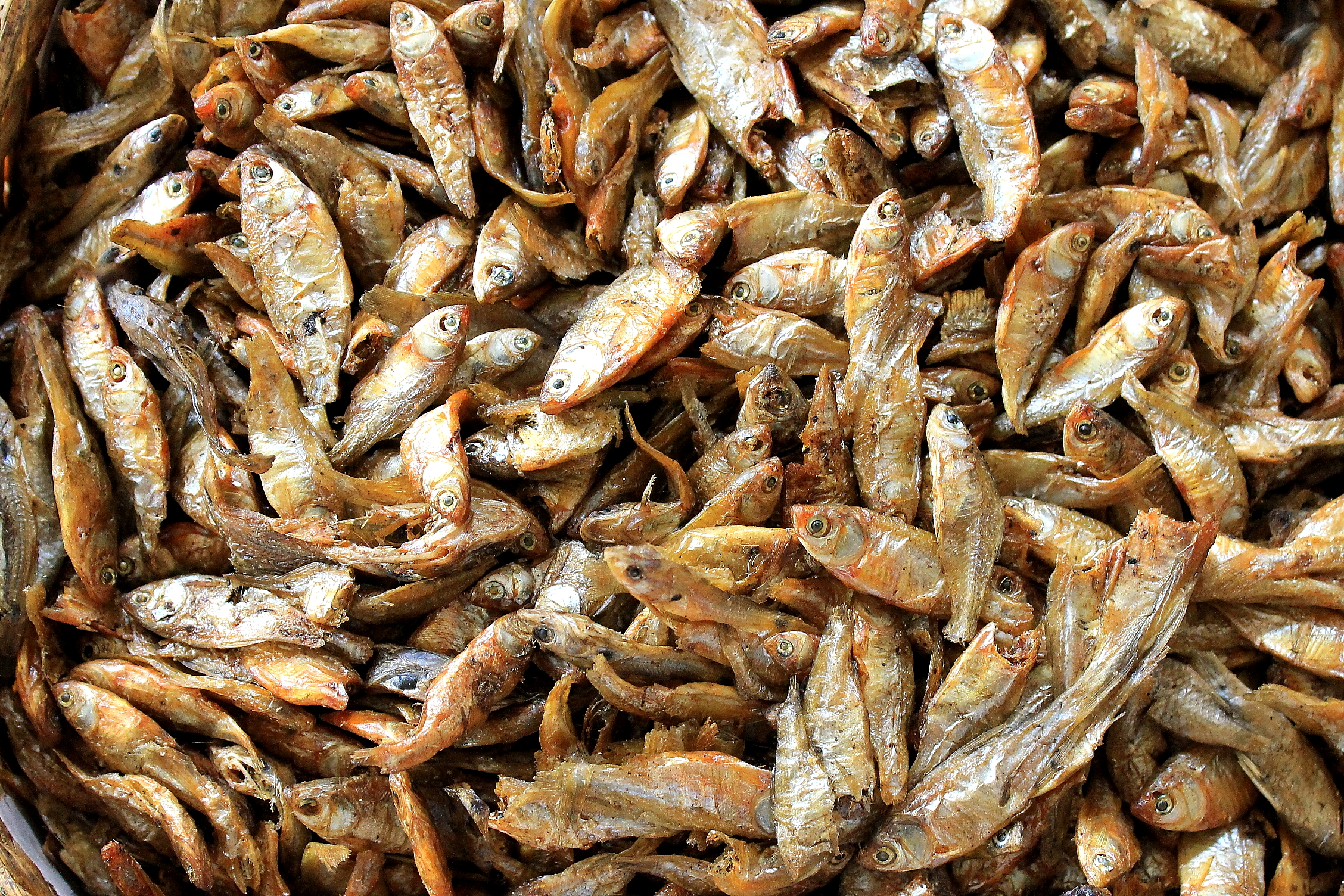
Dried freshwater fish sold at the Ima Keithel market in Imphal

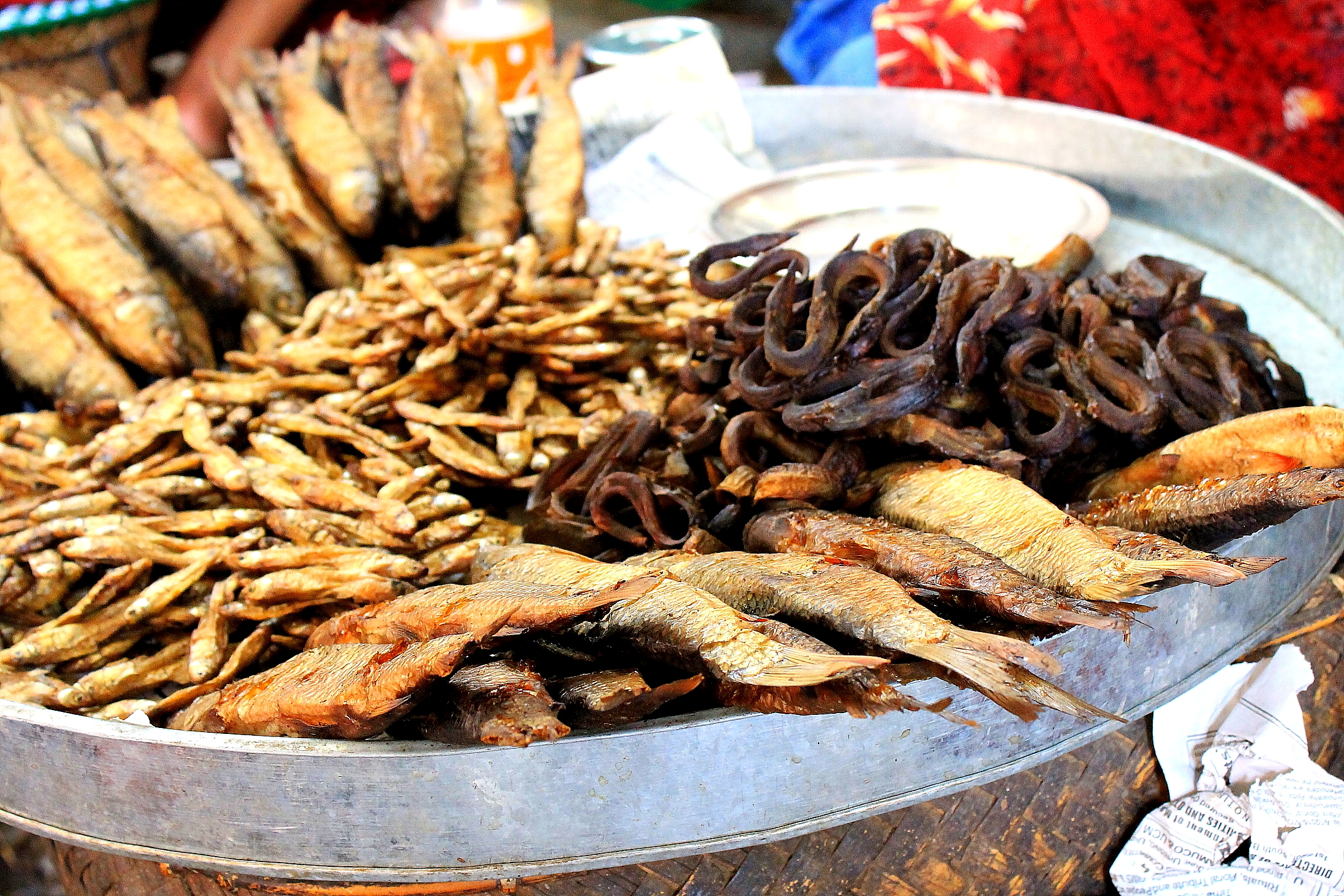
Dried freshwater fish sold at the Ima Keithel

Meiteis regularly enjoy both fresh and preserved fish, and serve diverse fish dishes during feasts, gatherings, and special events. Popular fish varieties include Indian major carp, exotic carp, boal, and several species of catfish, snakeheads, and gouramis. Preserved fish, in the form of ngari (fermented pool barbs), hentak (a fermented paste made with Indian flying barbs and giant taro stems), and smoked fish are found in almost every Meitei home. In Meitei cooking, spices like Chinese chives (maroi nakuppi) and garlic chives (maroi napakpi) are commonly used to mask the fishy smell in curries. Ngari (fermented fish) is also added to neutralize fishiness and enhance flavor.

Meitei fish dishes include:

- Kangsoi: A boiled vegetable curry enriched with fermented and smoked fish.
- Eromba: A chutney mixed with fermented fish, and optionally, smoked or shallow-fried fish for extra flavor.
- Morok metpa: A spicy chutney made from chili and ngari or hentak, topped with cilantro and onion.
- Singju: salad made with fermented fish and various vegetables like cabbage, lotus roots, pea leaves, banana stem, Colocasia stems, and spring onions.
- Atoiba thongba: mashed fish curry.
- Nganam: steamed fish.
- Nga ayaiba: smoked fish.

== In mythology, folklore and religion ==
Fish is very important in all stages of life, from birth to death. It plays a key role in every Meitei ritual, celebration, and offering.

Ngaleima is the goddess of fish and other aquatic life in Sanamahism and Meitei mythology. She symbolizes the connection between the spiritual world and the life found in rivers, lakes, and seas.

Loktak Ima or Loktak Lairembi, a mother goddess, is believed to care for the fish in Loktak Lake. According to traditional Meitei beliefs, she is responsible for making sure that the fish population is always restored. Even if people catch a lot of fish from the lake, the fish never disappear completely. The goddess ensures that the fish population continues to grow and remain healthy.

=== Ngamu thaba ===
Ngamu thaba is a ritual in which a Ceylon snakehead (Meitei: ꯉꯥꯃꯨ, romanized: ngamu), which represents all fish species because of its good health, long life, and energy, is returned to the water, with songs or rhymes, on special dates in the lunar Meitei calendar. The ngamu is thought to have been created by nature before humans, making it a symbol of life and the natural world.

Ngamu thaba is practised in three main ways:

- Meetam ngamu yhaba: During a Meitei marriage ceremony, two ngamu are released into a pond or river when the bride and groom exchange blessings, wishing them a happy and peaceful life together.
- Ushin nga-yhaba: a healthy, mature ngamu is released to represent a sick person. The fish is believed to take away the person's illness and bring them health and happiness.
- Chahong-ngahong nga-thaba: a ngamu is released to wish a person good health and a long life, similar to how fish live well in clean water. It is done with the help of a Maiba (a Meitei traditional singer) who sings special rhymes.

=== Ngamhai ===
A small ngamhai fish was swimming in the river when it saw Goddess Phouoibi walking towards the riverbank. Phouoibi didn't know how deep the river was, so she asked a deer on the other side if the water was shallow. The deer lied and said the river was not deep. Phouoibi tried to cross, but she couldn't swim and began to drown.

The little fish noticed Phouoibi struggling and quickly swam to her rescue. It helped her reach the shore of the other riverbank. Grateful for the fish's help, Phouoibi thanked it and gave the fish a special gift. She wished that it would shine brightly like a mirror in the clear water. Phouoibi also hoped that ballad singers would always praise the ngamhai fish's silvery beauty whenever they told its story.

=== Shareng ===
In the Meitei folktale of Yenakha Paotapi, a childless couple plays a riddle game, where the winner is rewarded with a Shareng fish (Wallago attu, helicopter catfish). The husband presents a riddle about a four-spoked wheel, which the wife cannot solve. He explains the answer, and she then asks a riddle about something that cries when fed, which the husband correctly identifies as a "kaptreng." As a result, the wife owes him a fish. The fish serves as a playful prize in their tradition.

=== Holy and sacred fish ===
Holy and sacred fishes	Associated Meitei clans (of Yek Salai/Meitei confederacy)	Romanisation	Note(s)
Saareng Angaangba/Ngaahei	ꯅꯤꯡꯊꯧꯖꯥ (ꯃꯉꯥꯡ)	Ningthouja (Mangang)	
Saareng Luwaoba/Ngaamu	ꯂꯨꯋꯥꯡ	Luwang	
Saareng Mureinaba/Ngaatin	ꯈꯨꯃꯟ	Khuman	
Saareng Angouba/Ngaraa	ꯑꯉꯣꯝ	Angom	
Saareng Naapu	ꯃꯣꯢꯔꯥꯡ ꯁꯂꯥꯢ (ꯃꯣꯢꯂꯥꯡ)	Moirang (Moilang)	
Saareng Ngaangna Laangba	ꯈꯥ ꯉꯥꯟꯄ	Kha-Nganpa	
Saareng Sangbaannana Laangba/Ngaaren	ꯁꯂꯥꯡ ꯂꯩꯁꯥꯡꯊꯦꯝ (ꯁꯂꯥꯏ ꯂꯩꯁꯥꯡꯊꯦꯝ)	Chenglei (Sarang / Salang / Salai Leishangthem)	

== In marriage ceremony ==
In Meitei marriage traditions, fish symbolize unity and the couple's shared journey. The ceremony starts with the groom's and bride's families releasing a pair of Ngamu (Channa spp.) into a body of water. The fish swimming side by side reflects harmony and lifelong unity for the couple. However, if one fish moves away or behaves differently, it is seen as a bad sign.

In Meitei wedding traditions, the bride is gifted a special bamboo-woven basket called Ngarubak or Lubak, containing at least seven varieties of smoked fish. This gift marks the beginning of her new chapter. The basket usually includes Ngamu (Channa), Nganap (Pangio pangia, Lepidocephalichthys guntea), Ngaton (Cirrhinus reba), Ngasang (Danio aequipinnatus), Ngahei (Eutropiichthys vacha), Nganoi (Systomus sarana) and Muka Nga (Amblypharyngodon mola).

Each fish is chosen for its symbolic meaning based on its local name:

- Nganap represents lifelong togetherness.
- Ngasang represents progress and continuity.
- Ngahei represents excellence and intellect.
- Nganoi represents wealth and prosperity.

These meaningful names are believed to bring blessings and good fortune to the couple. On their wedding night, the newlyweds share Nganap fish, a tradition symbolizing their bond of lifelong unity.

=== Mapam Chakouba (5th Day Post-Marriage Ceremony) ===
After a wedding, the bride's family hosts a grand feast for the newlyweds and their families. Key dishes include fish curries made with fresh fish and Eromba (a dish with fermented fish). This event reflects the community's joy, hospitality, and their wishes for the couple's happy future.

== In pregnancy and childbirth ==
=== Tha Mapan Sareng Pijaba (Third Trimester Pregnancy Ceremony) ===
During the expecting mother's 9th month, her parents organize a feast at their home to ensure her well-being. The feast features Wallago attu (Meitei-Sareng), a freshwater catfish, which is exclusively prepared for the mother-to-be. Leftover bones or scraps are ceremonially buried, symbolizing respect and care for the mother and unborn child.

=== Eepan Thaba (Post-Birth Inaugural Ceremony) ===
On the 6th day after a baby's birth, a purification ceremony for both mother and child is held. It begins with offerings placed where the morning sunlight touches the floor, dedicated to Korouhanba, the Meitei sun god. Offerings include garlands of dried fish like Ngakha (Pethia ticto), Phabou (Puntius chola), meitei-thum (salt cake), and ginger. Additional offerings to Emoinu, the Meitei goddess, include raw rice, chili, fruit leaves (heibi mana), Colocasia stems (yendem), and dried Ngamu (Channa). A Maibi (Meitei priestess) prepares Singju (a salad) on plantain leaves while softly uttering 'ku-ku-ku,' mimicking feeding sounds to bless the baby with a long and healthy life.

=== Post-Partum Dietary Practice ===
After childbirth, Meitei mothers avoid oil-cooked foods and consume smoked or dried fish with salt and steamed rice for up to 12 days or longer. Fermented products like Ngari are avoided, but fresh Hentak is allowed due to its shelf life and non-fermented nature. Indigenous fish species like Pethia meinganbii and Pethia manipurensis are believed to aid the mother's healing during this period. The care for the mother reflects a belief that her skin is as delicate as her newborn's.

=== Chagumba (First Food Feeding Ceremony) ===
This rite of passage marks an infant's first intake of solid food, usually at around six months. A priest or priestess selects an auspicious date for the ceremony. Soft rice, made with boiled rice, milk, and sugar, is prepared by the mother or grandmother. It's a festive occasion with family, friends, and neighbors celebrating with various fish dishes.

== In death ceremony ==
=== End-of-Life Ritual (Nga Tangba) ===
In Meitei culture, family members follow a vegetarian diet from the time of a loved one's death until the death ceremony, typically held on the 12th or 14th day. Following this, the Nga Tangba ceremony marks the return to non-vegetarian meals. A variety of fish dishes are prepared as part of this ritual, signifying closure and transition.

== In traditional festivals ==
=== Imoinu Iratpa ===
Dedicated to Imoinu (Emoinu), the goddess of wealth and prosperity, the Imoinu Iratpa (also spelled as Emoinu Eratpa) festival reflects the cultural importance of fish. Sareng (freshwater catfish) or any white-colored fish and eels are the preferred offerings. Since Sareng is costly, wealthier individuals typically provide it, while others offer white or light-colored fish, showcasing the goddess's fairness and inclusivity, embracing both rich and poor. The festival is observed every year on the 12th day of the Meitei lunar month of Wakching, which usually falls in January.

=== Ningol Chakkouba ===
This annual festival strengthens the bond between married daughters (Ningol) and their paternal families. It revolves around a feast (Chakouba) featuring fish dishes, with fish curry made from premium varieties like Wallago attu and large-sized carps as the centerpiece. Fish farmers prepare for the festival by stocking ponds, while natural water bodies like Loktak Lake are often replenished with fish seeds to ensure ample supply for the celebration.

=== Cheiraoba ===
Celebrated as the New Year in the Meitei calendar, Sajibu Cheiraoba includes offering Channa orientalis (Ngamu fish) to the Meitei deities. This ritual seeks to ensure the family's well-being and protect them from misfortune, marking a fresh start to the year with hope and positivity. On Cheiraoba, the priest (Maiba) performs the Usin divination ritual with Ngamu fish in front of Lainingthou Sanamahi to protect each family member from misfortune. The fish is then released into a pond. The priest observes its movement—if the fish stays calm and swims straight, it is considered a positive sign for the individual's fortune.

=== Saroi Khangba (Ritual to Appease Dark Gods) ===
Observed during the month of Lamta (March), Meiteis believe dark gods hold stronger influence. On the first and last Saturdays of this month, women perform Saroi Khangba by offering mixed vegetable dishes like banana stem (laphu) and Colocasia stem (yendem), combined with fermented fish (Ngari) and smoked fish. The ritual takes place at the boundary of villages or colonies and serves as a symbolic act to appease the dark gods, substituting human lives and ensuring harmony and protection.

== Earthquakes ==
The Meitei people have a unique tradition tied to earthquakes. During such events, they utter the word "chak-nga," which translates to "rice-fish." This reflects their belief that rice and fish, essential for survival, should always be available during times of crisis. From a young age, children are taught to recite this word as a prayer to God whenever an earthquake strikes, emphasizing the cultural significance of resilience and sustenance in challenging times. It's a powerful reminder of the role food plays in their traditions and values.

== In popular culture ==
=== Emoinu Fish Fest ===
The Emoinu Fish Fest or Imoinu Fish Fair, held every January at Hapta Kangjeibung, offers around 80,000 kg (180,000 lb) of fish (as of 2025) for religious and everyday needs during the Imoinu Iratpa festival. It also provides seasonal fruits and vegetables for rituals. Popular fish like Sareng are sold at affordable prices. Celebrated on the 12th day of the Meitei month of Wakching, this fair honors Emoinu, the goddess of wealth, while supporting traditions and local farming.

== Gallery ==
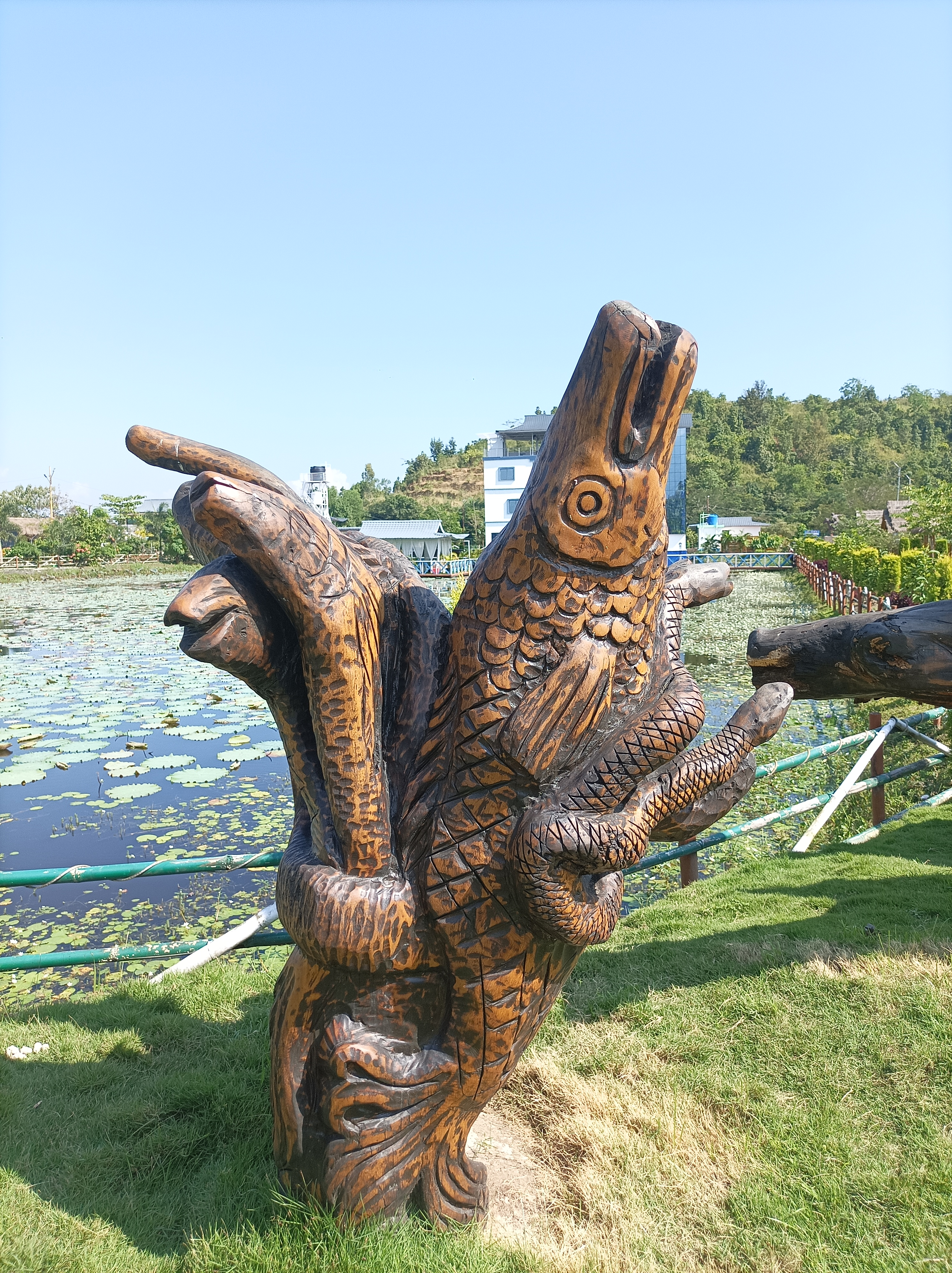
Wooden artworks of aquatic creatures, displayed in the Joysana Retreat

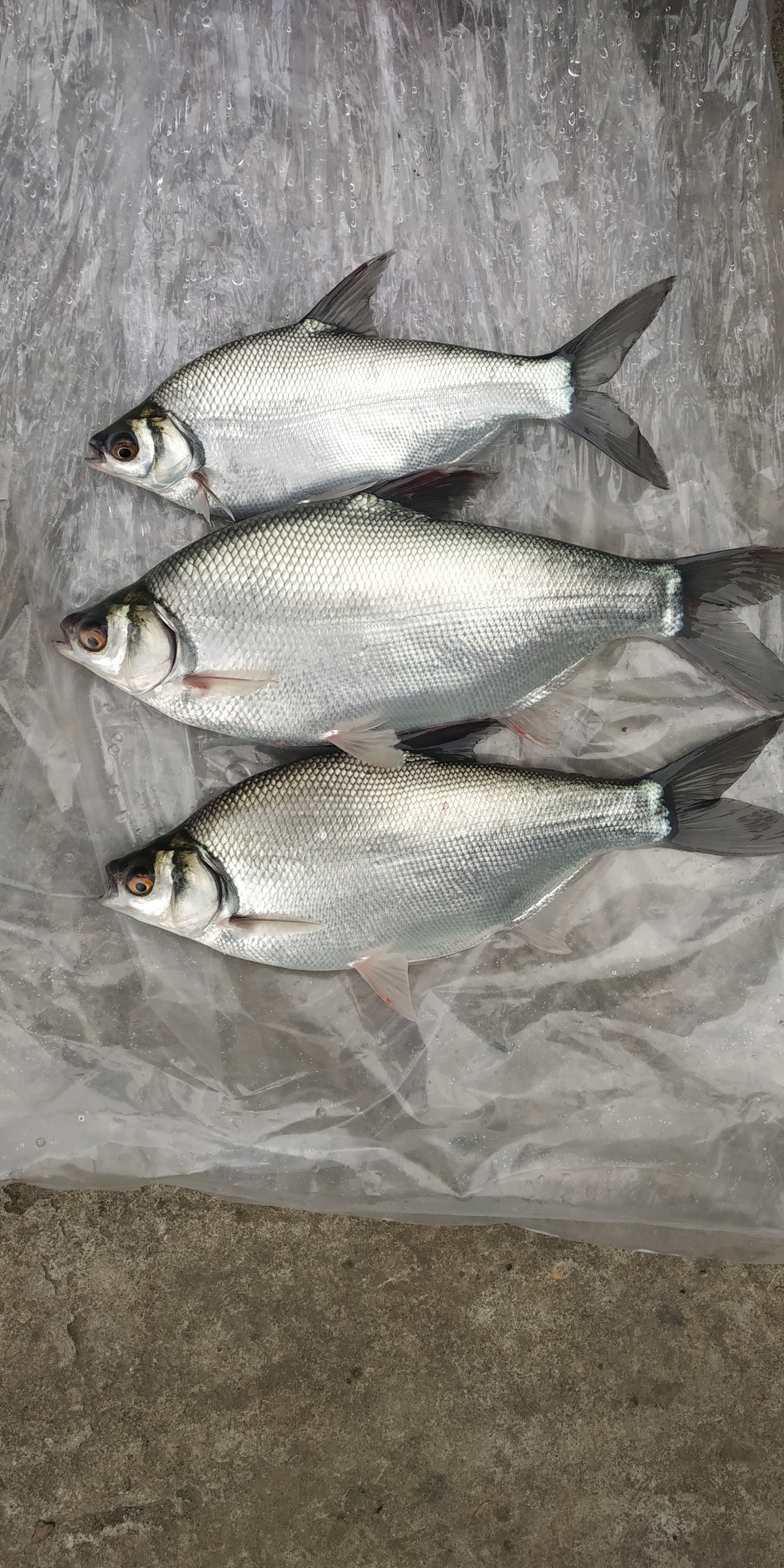

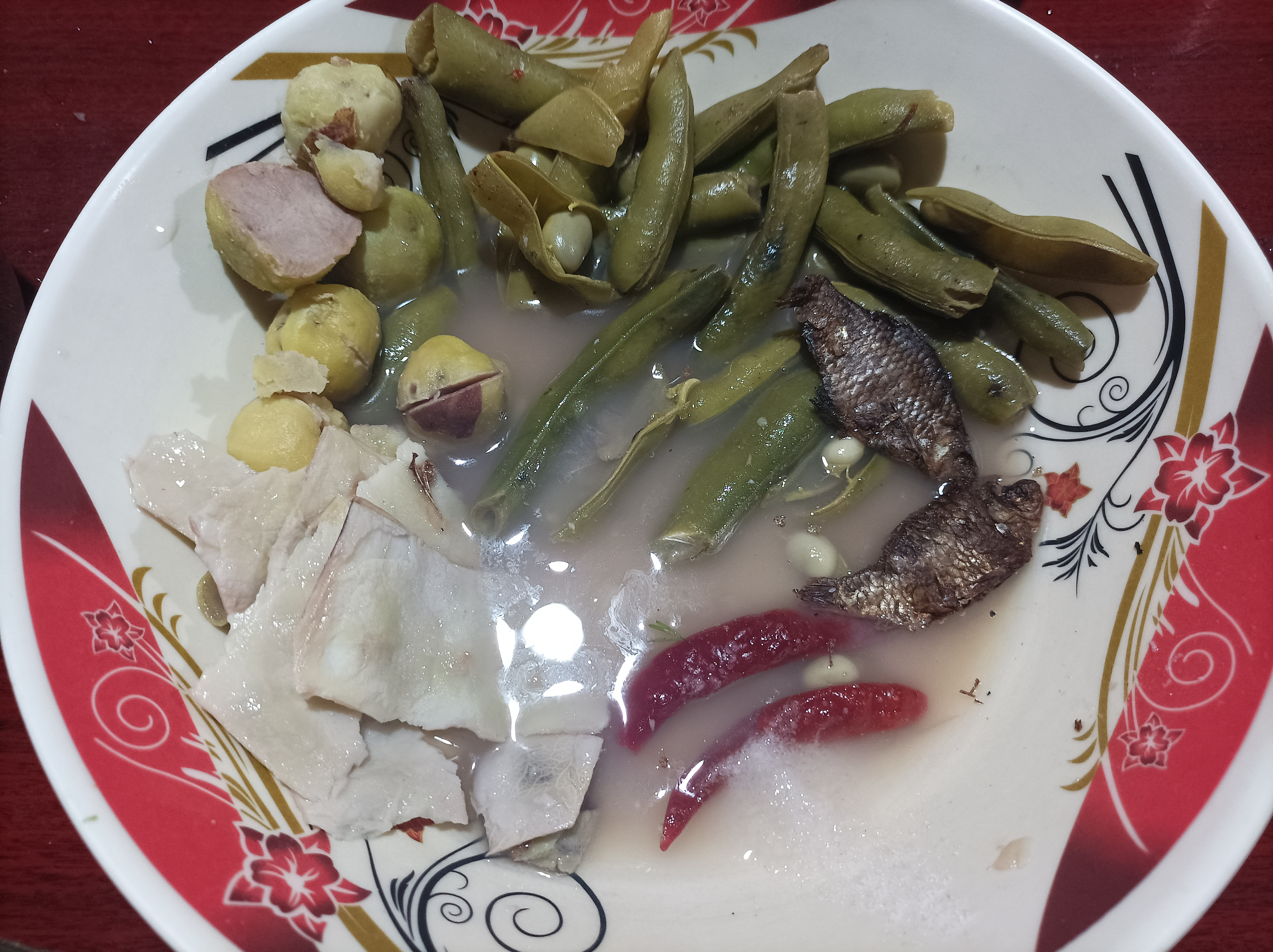
Ingredients for making traditional Meitei food, Eromba

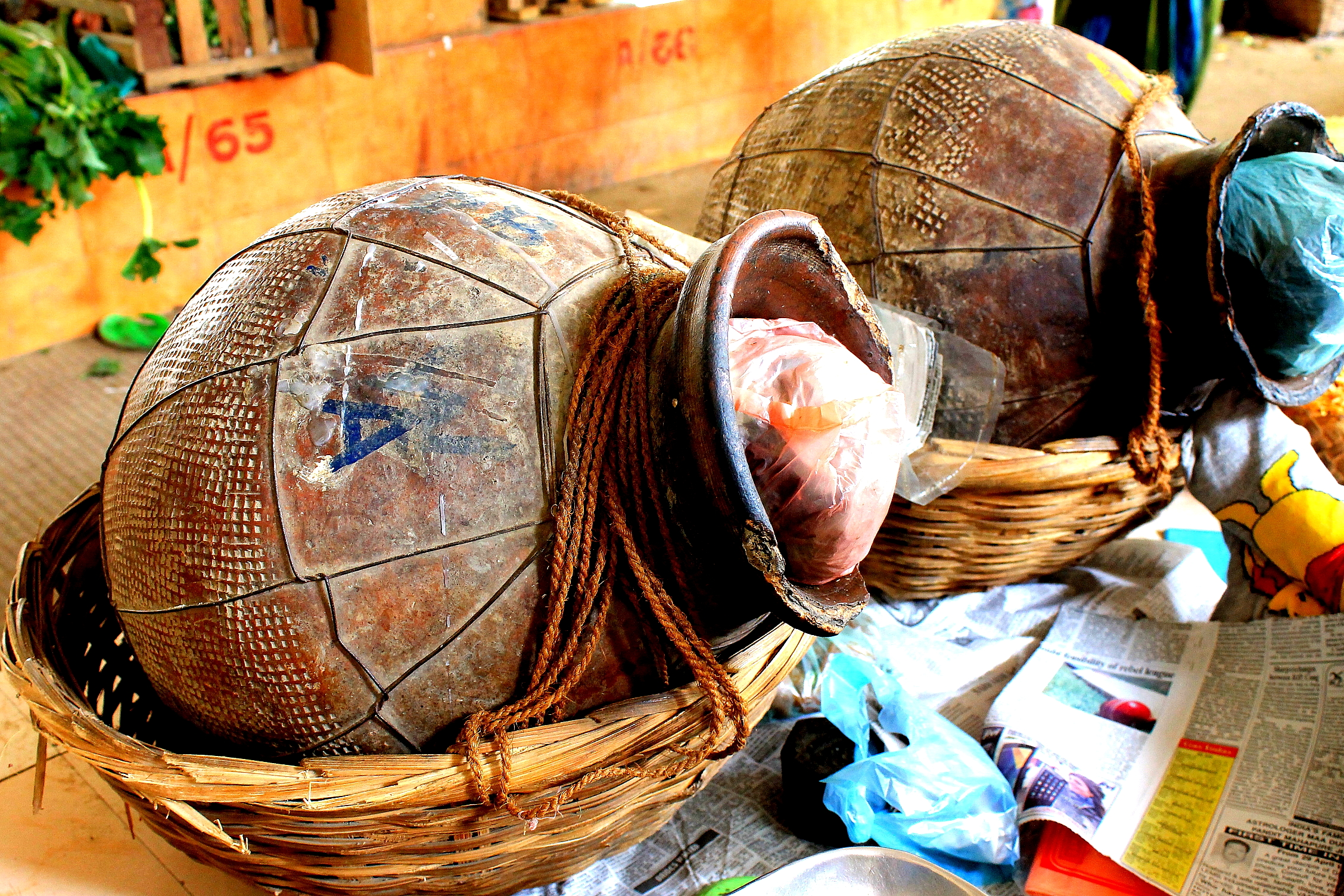
Ngari (fermented fish)

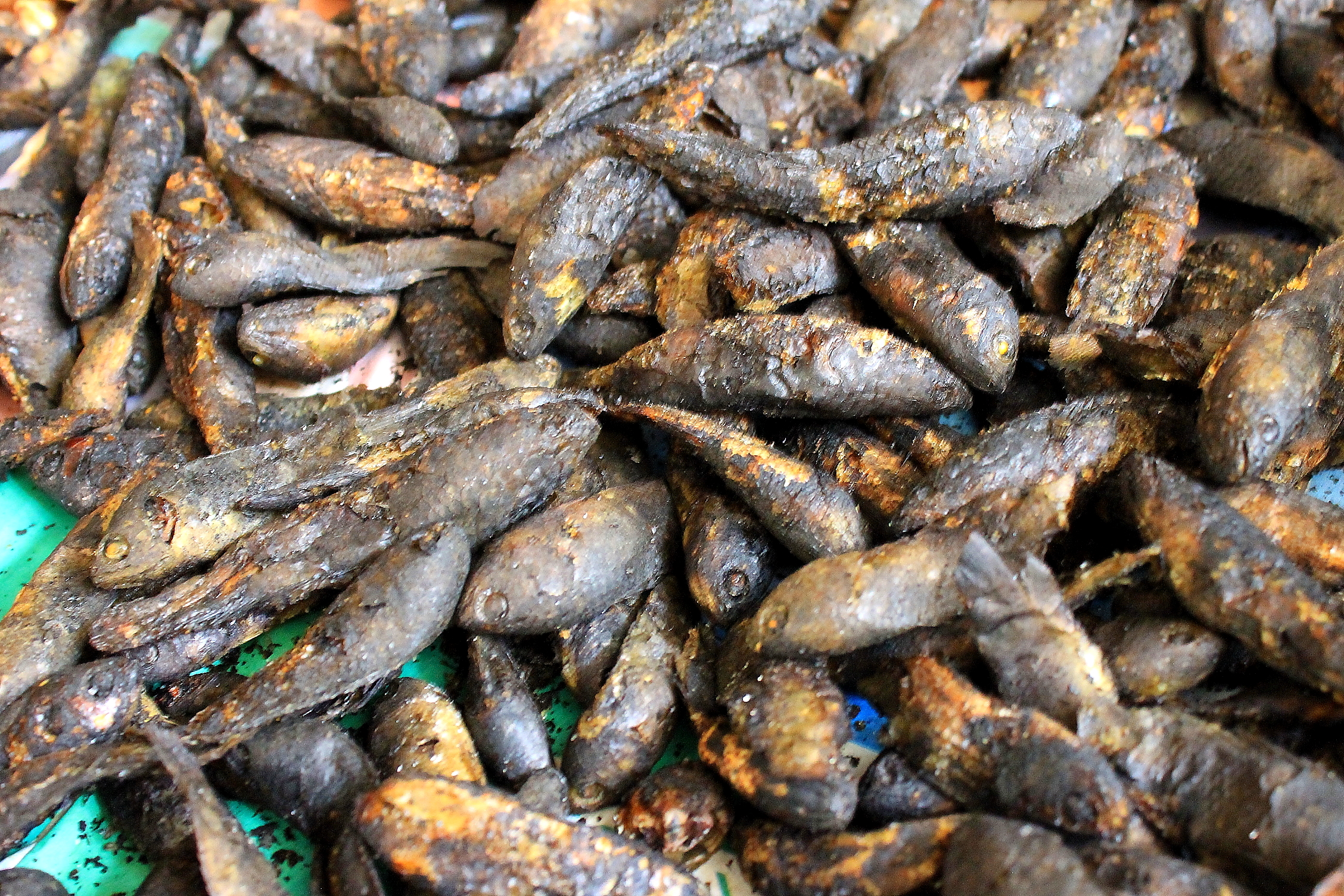
Smoked fish

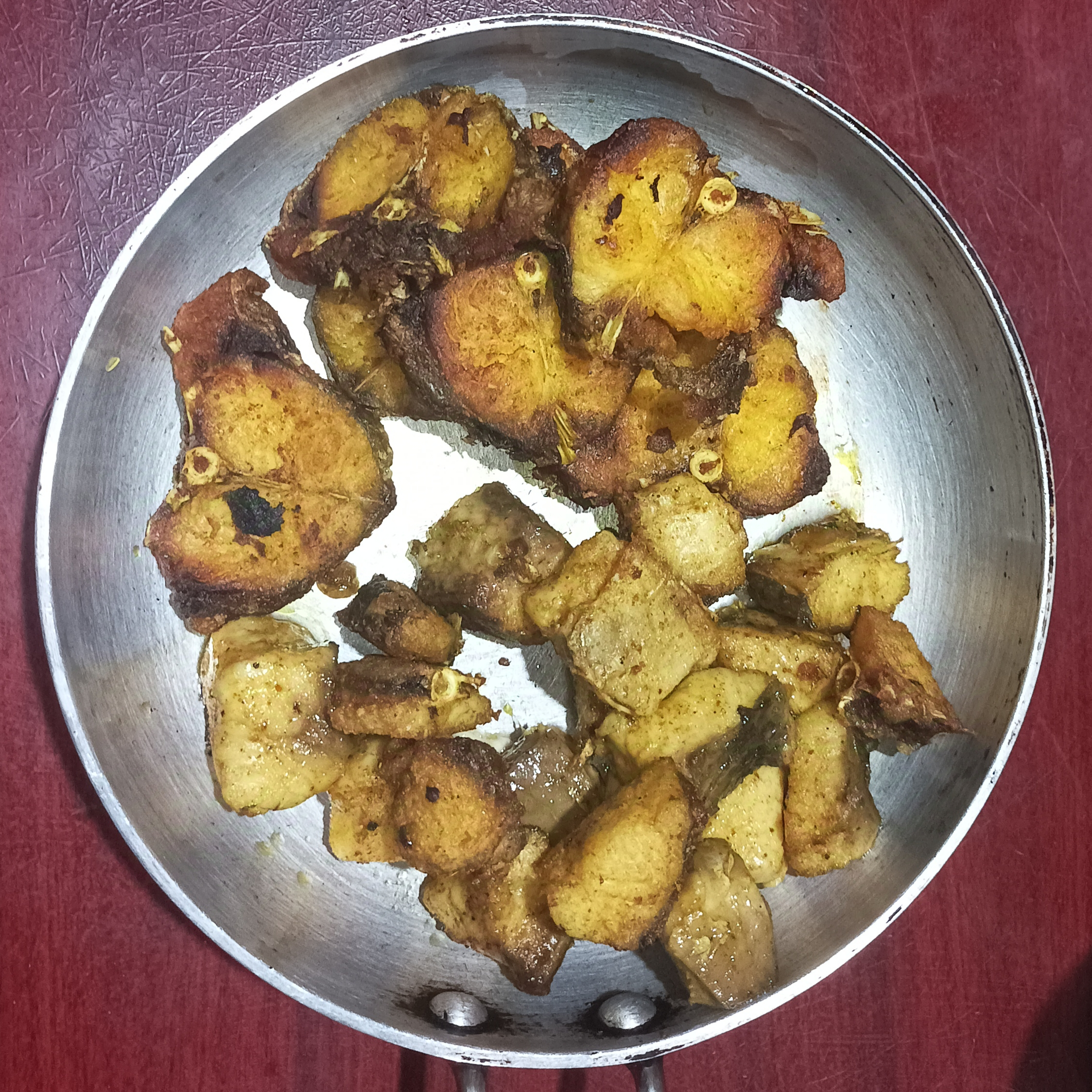
Nga Ataoba, a traditional Meitei fried fish dish

== See also ==
- Human uses of fish
- Fish in Chinese culture
- Lai Haraoba
- Meitei martial arts
- Meitei traditional games
- Meitei traditional toys
- Meitei traditional weapons
