= Waikhomia hira =

Scientific classification
- Kingdom: Animalia
- Phylum: Chordata
- Class: Actinopterygii
- Order: Cypriniformes
- Family: Cyprinidae
- Genus: Waikhomia
- Species: W. hira

Binomial name
- Waikhomia hira Katwate, Kumkar, Raghavan & Dahanukar, 2020

Species of fish

Waikhomia hira is a species of freshwater ray-finned fish belonging to the belonging to the family Cyprinidae, which includes the carps, barbs and related fishes. This species is endemic to the Western Ghats of India.

== Taxonomy ==
Waikhomia hira was first formally described in 2020 by Unmesh Katwate, Pradeep Kumkar, Rajeev Raghavan and Neelesh Dahanukar, with its type locality given as the Kali River near Chandewadi, Kamra, Uttara Kannada District, Karnataka, India at 15°22'13.8"N, 74°24"36.0"E from an altitude of 592 m (1,942 ft). When they described this species, the authors proposed a new genus, Waikhomia, which included this species as its type species, as well as the species previously known as Puntius sahyadriensis. Waikhomia is classified in the subfamily Smiliogastrinae of the family Cyprinidae.

== Etymology ==
Waikhomia hira is the type species of the genus Waikhomia. This name honours the Indian ichthyologist Vishwanath Waikhom of Manipur University for his contribution to the study of the freshwater fishes of India. The specific name, hira, is derived from heera, the Bengali word for "diamond", an allusion to the small rhomboidal spots along the flanks of this fish.

== Description ==
Waikhomia hira and its congener W. sahyadriensis are distinguished from other related smiliogastrine barbs by the absence of barbels. The rearmost unbranched dorsal fin ray is not serrated, and is segmented towards its tip; the pelvic fin are jet black with white tips; and the body is marked with between 6 and 8 spots and blotches along the flanks. W. hira is identified from W. sahyadriensis by having 7 or 8 small, diamond-shaped blotches along the flanks with the lateral line running thropugh them.

== Distribution ==
Waikhomia hira is endemic to the northern Western Ghats in Karnataka, where it has been recorded from the drainage system of the Kali River.
