= Pethia sanjaymoluri =

Conservation status
- Endangered (IUCN 3.1)

Scientific classification
- Kingdom: Animalia
- Phylum: Chordata
- Class: Actinopterygii
- Order: Cypriniformes
- Family: Cyprinidae
- Subfamily: Smiliogastrinae
- Genus: Pethia
- Species: P. sanjaymoluri

Binomial name
- Pethia sanjaymoluri Katwate, Jadhav, Kumkar, Raghavan & Dahanukar, 2016

Species of fish

Pethia sanjaymoluri, Sanjay's black-tip pethia, is a species of ray finned fish from the subfamily Barbinae, of the family Cyprinidae. It is found in the Pavana and Nira Rivers which are tributaries of the Bhima River, part of Krishna River system in Maharashtra, India.
