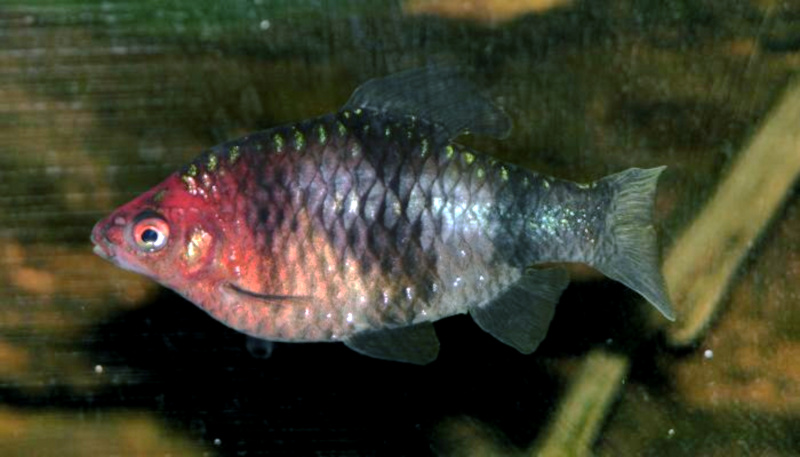
- Black ruby barb, Pethia nigrofasciata

Scientific classification
- Kingdom: Animalia
- Phylum: Chordata
- Class: Actinopterygii
- Order: Cypriniformes
- Family: Cyprinidae
- Subfamily: Smiliogastrinae
- Genus: Pethia; Pethiyagoda, Meegaskumbura & Maduwage, 2012

Type species
- Barbus nigrofasciatus Günther, 1868

= Pethia =

Genus of fishes

Pethia is a genus of small freshwater fish in the family Cyprinidae native to South Asia, East Asia (only Pethia stoliczkana recorded) and Mainland Southeast Asia. Some species are commonly seen in the aquarium trade. The name Pethia is derived from the Sinhalese "pethia", a generic word used to describe any of several small species of cyprinid fishes. Most members of this genus were included in Puntius, until it was revised in 2012.

== Species ==
Pethia contains the following species:

- Pethia ambassis (Day, 1869)
- Pethia arunachalensis Shangningam, Kosygin & Chowdhury, 2020 (Arunachal barb)
- Pethia atra (Linthoingambi & Vishwanath, 2007)
- Pethia aurea Knight, 2013
- Pethia bandula (Kottelat & Pethiyagoda, 1991) (Bandula barb)
- Pethia canius (Hamilton, 1822)
- Pethia castor Conway, Pinion & Kottelat, 2021
- Pethia chakpiensis Shangningam & Kosygin, 2023
- Pethia conchonius (Hamilton, 1822) (Rosy barb)
- Pethia cumingii (Günther, 1868)
- Pethia dibrugarhensis Sharma, Vishwanath, Dishma, Borah & Das, 2025
- Pethia didi (Kullander & Fang, 2005)
- Pethia dikhuensis Praveenraj, Limaakum, Knight, Moulitharan & Imchen, 2022
- Pethia erythromycter (Kullander, 2008)
- Pethia expletiforis Dishma & Vishwanath, 2013
- Pethia gelius (Hamilton, 1822) (Golden barb)
- Pethia guganio (Hamilton, 1822) (Glass barb)
- Pethia khugae (Linthoingambi & Vishwanath, 2007) (Khuga barb)
- Pethia longicauda U. Katwate, Paingankar, Raghavan & Dahanukar, 2014 (Long-tailed pethia)
- Pethia lutea U. Katwate, C. Katwate, Raghavan, Paingankar & Dahanukar, 2014 (Citron barb)
- Pethia macrogramma (Kullander, 2008)
- Pethia manipurensis (Menon, Rema Devi & Vishwanath, 2000)
- Pethia meingangbii (Arunkumar & Tombi Singh, 2003)
- Pethia melanomaculata (Deraniyagala, 1956) (Tic-tac-toe barb)
- Pethia muvattupuzhaensis (Jameela Beevi & Ramachandran, 2005)
- Pethia nankyweensis (Kullander, 2008)
- Pethia narayani (Hora, 1937) (Narayan barb)
- Pethia nigripinnis (Knight, Rema Devi, Indra & Arunachalam, 2012) (Black fin barb)
- Pethia nigrofasciata (Günther, 1868) (Black ruby barb)
- Pethia padamya (Kullander & Britz, 2008) (Odessa barb)
- Pethia phutunio (Hamilton, 1822) (Spottedsail barb)
- Pethia poiensis Shangningam & Vishwanath, 2018
- Pethia pollux Conway, Pinion & Kottelat, 2021
- Pethia pookodensis (Mercy & Eapen, 2007) (Pookode Lake barb)
- Pethia pugio (Kullander, 2008)
- Pethia punctata (Day, 1865) (Dotted sawfin barb)
- Pethia reval (Meegaskumbura, N. K. A. Silva, Maduwage & Pethiyagoda, 2008) (Red-banded barb)
- Pethia rutila Lalramliana, Knight & Laltlanhlua, 2014
- Pethia sahit U. Katwate, Kumkar, Raghavan & Dahanukar, 2018
- Pethia sanjaymoluri Katwate, Jadhav, Kumkar, Raghavan & Dahanukar, 2016
- Pethia setnai (Chhapgar & Sane, 1992) (Indigo barb)
- Pethia shalynius (Yazdani & Talukdar, 1975) (Shalyni barb)
- Pethia sharmai (Menon & Rema Devi, 1993) (Chennai sawfin bar)
- Pethia stoliczkana (Day, 1871)
- Pethia striata Atkore, Knight, Rema Devi & Krishnaswamy, 2015 (Kudremukh barb)
- Pethia thelys (Kullander, 2008)
- Pethia tiantian (Kullander & Fang, 2005) (Burmese bumblebee barb)
- Pethia ticto (Hamilton, 1822) (Ticto barb)
- Pethia yuensis (Arunkumar & Tombi Singh, 2003)
