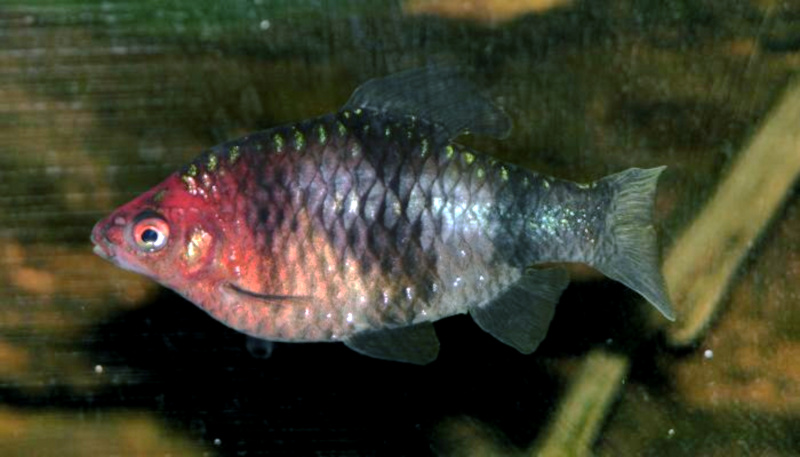

Conservation status
- Vulnerable (IUCN 3.1)

Scientific classification
- Kingdom: Animalia
- Phylum: Chordata
- Class: Actinopterygii
- Order: Cypriniformes
- Family: Cyprinidae
- Subfamily: Smiliogastrinae
- Genus: Pethia
- Species: P. nigrofasciata

Binomial name
- Pethia nigrofasciata (Günther, 1868)

Synonyms
- Barbus nigrofasciatus Günther, 1868; Puntius nigrofasciatus (Günther, 1868)

= Black ruby barb =

Species of fish

The black ruby barb (Pethia nigrofasciata, formerly Puntius nigrofasciatus) or purplehead barb is a tropical cyprinid fish endemic to Sri Lanka, where it occurs in forested streams from the Kelani basin to the Nilwala basin. They are found in streams on hills around 1,000 ft (300 m) in elevation. The brightly colored population introduced to Mahaweli at Ginigathena, Sri Lanka, is said to have diminished in number due to the aquarium export trade.

== Description ==
The young fish has a yellowish-gray body with black vertical stripes. The silver body turns into a dark ruby-red color in mature, breeding males. In the female, the basal part of all the vertical fins is black. In the male, the whole dorsal fin is a deep black, the anal fin blackish red, and the pelvic fins are purple. The fish will grow to a maximum length of 2–3 inches (5.1–7.6 cm) with the female being slightly longer than the male.

== Water conditions ==
Black ruby barbs natively live in a tropical climate among cool, shady, quietly flowing forested streams with either gravel or sand substrates. Their diet mainly consists of filamentous algae and detritus. They prefer water with a 6.0–6.5 pH, a water hardness of 5–12 dGH, and a temperature range of 72–79 °F (22–26 °C).

== Commercial importance ==
The fish has commercial importance in the aquarium hobby, and is successfully bred in captivity. They are also used to create hybrid forms of "odessa barbs" for the aquarium trade.

== Breeding ==
An egg-scatterer, the fish spawn more than 100 eggs in shallow water among the plants. The eggs hatch in one to two days and then will be free-swimming after 24 hours.

== In the aquarium ==
Plenty of room should be provided for this fish, with plenty of light and a shallow covering of floating plants and ample vegetation (half to two-thirds of the tank area). A layer of humus should be left on the bottom. This species is good for keeping with other barbs and similar fish. In captivity, the fish are omnivorous, with a healthy appetite.

The black ruby barb is an active swimmer that is best kept in schools of at least six.

== See also ==
- List of freshwater aquarium fish species
