= Pethia muvattupuzhaensis =

Scientific classification
- Domain: Eukaryota
- Kingdom: Animalia
- Phylum: Chordata
- Class: Actinopterygii
- Order: Cypriniformes
- Family: Cyprinidae
- Genus: Pethia
- Species: P. muvattupuzhaensis

Binomial name
- Pethia muvattupuzhaensis (Jameela Beevi & Ramachandran, 2005)

Synonyms
- Puntius muvattupuzhaensis Jameela Beevi & Ramachandran, 2005

Species of fish

Pethia muvattupuzhaensis is a species of cyprinid fish found in Muvattupuzha and Periyar Rivers, Kerala, India. It is sometimes considered conspecific with Pethia punctata. Day, 1865 This species can be found over sand or gravel substrates. This species reaches a length of 4.5 centimetres (1.8 in) SL.
