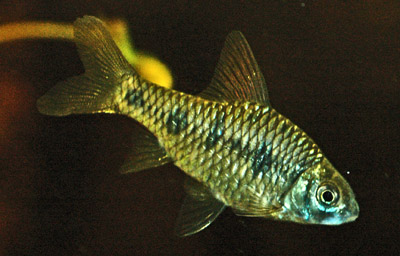
- Waikhomia sahyadriensis

Scientific classification
- Kingdom: Animalia
- Phylum: Chordata
- Class: Actinopterygii
- Order: Cypriniformes
- Family: Cyprinidae
- Subfamily: Smiliogastrinae
- Genus: Waikhomia; Katwate, Kumkar, Raghavan & Dahanukar, 2020

Type species
- Waikhomia hira Katwate, Kumkar, Raghavan & Dahanukar, 2020

= Waikhomia =

Genus of fishes

Waikhomia is a genus of freshwater ray-finned fishes belonging to the family Cyprinidae, the family which includes the carps, barbs and related fishes. The fishes in this genus are endemic to the hillstreams of the Western Ghats in India.

== Species ==
Waikhomia contains the following species;

- Waikhomia hira Katwate, Kumkar, Raghavan & Dahanukar, 2020
- Waikhomia sahyadriensis (Silas, 1953) (Khavli barb)
