= Pethia lutea =

Conservation status
- Vulnerable (IUCN 3.1)

Scientific classification
- Kingdom: Animalia
- Phylum: Chordata
- Class: Actinopterygii
- Order: Cypriniformes
- Family: Cyprinidae
- Subfamily: Smiliogastrinae
- Genus: Pethia
- Species: P. lutea

Binomial name
- Pethia lutea Katwate, Katwate, Raghavan, Paingankar & Dahanukar, 2014

Species of fish

Pethia lutea, the citron barb, is a species of cyprinid fish native to India where it is found in Maharashtra, India. This species can reach a length of 3.9 centimetres (1.5 in) SL.
