= Pethia longicauda =

Conservation status
- Vulnerable (IUCN 3.1)

Scientific classification
- Kingdom: Animalia
- Phylum: Chordata
- Class: Actinopterygii
- Order: Cypriniformes
- Family: Cyprinidae
- Subfamily: Smiliogastrinae
- Genus: Pethia
- Species: P. longicauda

Binomial name
- Pethia longicauda U. Katwate, Paingankar, Raghavan & Dahanukar, 2014

Species of fish

Pethia longicauda, the long-tailed pethia, is a species of cyprinid fish native to India where it is endemic to Hiranyakeshi river in Maharashtra, India. This species can reach a length of 3.8 centimetres (1.5 in) SL.
