= Pethia cumingii =

Conservation status
- Endangered (IUCN 3.1)

Scientific classification
- Kingdom: Animalia
- Phylum: Chordata
- Class: Actinopterygii
- Order: Cypriniformes
- Family: Cyprinidae
- Genus: Pethia
- Species: P. cumingii

Binomial name
- Pethia cumingii (Günther, 1868)

Synonyms
- Puntius cumingi (lapsus); Puntius cumingii (Günther, 1868)

Species of fish

Pethia cumingii, known as the Cuming's barb or the two spot barb (though that name can also apply to the Ticto barb, P. ticto), is a species of cyprinid fish endemic to Sri Lanka.

Its stocks have declined in recent decades, and in 1996 it was assessed to be in need of conservation to ensure it stays plentiful. However, this assessment may be outdated by now.

== Introduction ==
Some authors have recently proved that the diversity of Ichthyofauna of the Southwest Ichthyological zone streams of Sri Lanka has a great significance in the sense of biodiversity (Senanayeke, 1980; Wikramanayake, 1990; Pethiyagoda, 1991). The two-spot barb is distributed in Kelani River, Kalu River, Benthota River and Gin River.

Pethia cumingii, a Sri Lankan endemic, has long been presumed to be dichromatic, with some populations possessing yellow fins while others displayed red fins. Until 2008 Pethia reval, the red-finned color form, was not identified as a separate species from P. cumingii, and had been misunderstood as a "variety" of P. cumingii but has now been elevated to the status of species.

A silvery fish with yellow reflection on shoulders. Two rhomboid black patches on each side. The anterior one is above the middle of pectoral and includes the 3rd, 4th, and 5th lateral line scales. The posterior one is at the base of the caudal peduncle posterior to base of anal. Both blotches are widest at the lateral line. Eye pale yellow or white. Dosal and ventral orange, with two horizontal rows of 5-7 black spots on dorsal which has a black tip to its anterior spine. Remaining fins yellow (Daraniyagala, 1952). Dorsally olive, the side being silvery with a golden sheen. There are two vertically elongate blotches rather larger than the eye, one above the anal fine and the other above and behind the operculum. The dorsal and pelvic fines have yellow (Daraniyagala, 1952 / Pethiyagoda 1991).

Fins. D II.8, A 111.5, P 1.11, V 1.7-8, C 19. Last Osseous spine of dorsal moderately thick, strongly serrate, with a flexible smooth tip. Last osseous spine of anal smooth. Scales. Lateral line incomplete and disappears after 5-8 scales. LL 19–21, L tr. 3.5/3.5 predorsals 8, preventrals 11. Barbels absent. Head 3.6-4, eye 2.1-2.75, interorbit 1, depth of body 2-2.5, pectoral 4, ventral 4, caudal 2.9-3.2 in entire length (Daraniyagala, 1952).

== Habitat and Microhabitats ==
Schut, De silva and Kortmulder (1984) discuss the habitat associations of this species. They are usually associated with a mud or silt substrate, flowing water, and is associated with substrates from sand to boulders. Pethia cumingii has been introduced into the Mahaweli at Ginigathena, where the river bed comprises boulders and gravel, and has established a population there (Wikramanayake, 1990) They occupy the lower half of the water column. Pethia cumingii is usually active in flowing water and stays close to the substrate, and It is a hardy fish which is usually found in medium-sized shoals (Pethiyagoda 1991).

== Reproduction ==
They spawn with the onset of rains. About 100 eggs are spawned and hatch in about a day. Most of the fry are free-swimming the next day. De Silva and Kortmulder (1977) state that the fish is mature when 3 cm (1.2 in) long. Reproductive biology is discussed by De Silva, Schut and Kortmulder (1985).

== Distribution ==
The fish was occurs mainly in the south Western Wet Zone, Kelani River, Kalu River, Benthota river, Gin River. Daraniyagala (1952) recorded from Katupotha and Peradeniya.
