= Pethia atra =

Conservation status
- Vulnerable (IUCN 3.1)

Scientific classification
- Kingdom: Animalia
- Phylum: Chordata
- Class: Actinopterygii
- Order: Cypriniformes
- Family: Cyprinidae
- Subfamily: Smiliogastrinae
- Genus: Pethia
- Species: P. atra

Binomial name
- Pethia atra (Linthoingambi & Vishwanath, 2007)

Synonyms
- Puntius ater Linthoingambi & Vishwanath, 2007

Species of fish

Pethia atra is a species of cyprinid fish native to India where it is found in sluggish streams in the Imphal Valley, Manipur. This species can reach a length of 5.8 centimetres (2.3 in) SL.
