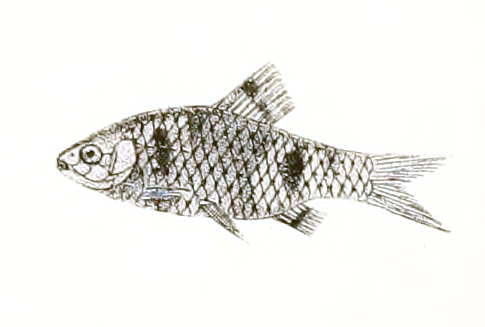

Conservation status
- Least Concern (IUCN 3.1)

Scientific classification
- Kingdom: Animalia
- Phylum: Chordata
- Class: Actinopterygii
- Order: Cypriniformes
- Family: Cyprinidae
- Subfamily: Smiliogastrinae
- Genus: Pethia
- Species: P. phutunio

Binomial name
- Pethia phutunio (F. Hamilton, 1822)

Synonyms
- Cyprinus phutunio F. Hamilton, 1822; Barbus phutunio (F. Hamilton, 1822); Puntius phutunio (F. Hamilton, 1822); Systomus phutunio (F. Hamilton, 1822); Systomus leptosomus McClelland, 1839

= Spottedsail barb =

Species of fish

The spottedsail barb, dwarf barb, green dwarf barb, phutuni barb, or pygmy barb (Pethia phutunio) is a tropical fresh water fish belonging to the subfamily Cyprininae of the family Cyprinidae. It originates in inland waters in Asia, and is found in Pakistan, India, Bangladesh and Myanmar.

The fish will grow in length up to 3.9 centimeters (1.5 inches). It is a silvery fish, with three blotches on the body. An additional dark spot on the gill plate is not black, but translucent, exposing the pink of the gills. Fins are pale orange, slightly darker in the male. Sexes are difficult to recognize, except that the female has a fuller body.

It natively inhabits clear or muddy streams, and rivers, as well as standing waters, with a silty bottom. They live in a tropical climate in water with a temperature range of 72–75 °F (22–24 °C). It feeds on worms, benthic crustaceans, insects and plant matter.

The spotted sail barb is of commercial importance in the aquarium trade industry.

The swamp barb is an open water, substrate egg-scatterer, and adults do not guard the eggs. It spawns near dawn between plants near the surface of the water. Eggs hatch in two days at 75 °F (24 °C). The name phutunio comes from a native name, pungti phutuni.

== See also ==
- List of freshwater aquarium fish species
