= Pethia khugae =

Conservation status
- Vulnerable (IUCN 3.1)

Scientific classification
- Kingdom: Animalia
- Phylum: Chordata
- Class: Actinopterygii
- Order: Cypriniformes
- Family: Cyprinidae
- Genus: Pethia
- Species: P. khugae

Binomial name
- Pethia khugae (Linthoingambi & Vishwanath, 2007)

Synonyms
- Puntius khugae Linthoingambi & Vishwanath, 2007

Species of fish

Pethia khugae. the Khuga barb, is a species of cyprinid fish native to India where it is found in the Chindwin River basin, occurring in clear, relatively fast-flowing streams. This species reaches a length of 4.7 centimetres (1.9 in) SL.
