= Pethia poiensis =

Scientific classification
- Domain: Eukaryota
- Kingdom: Animalia
- Phylum: Chordata
- Class: Actinopterygii
- Order: Cypriniformes
- Family: Cyprinidae
- Genus: Pethia
- Species: P. poiensis

Binomial name
- Pethia poiensis Shangningam & Vishwanath, 2018

Species of fish

Pethia poiensis is a species of cyprinid fish in the genus Pethia.
