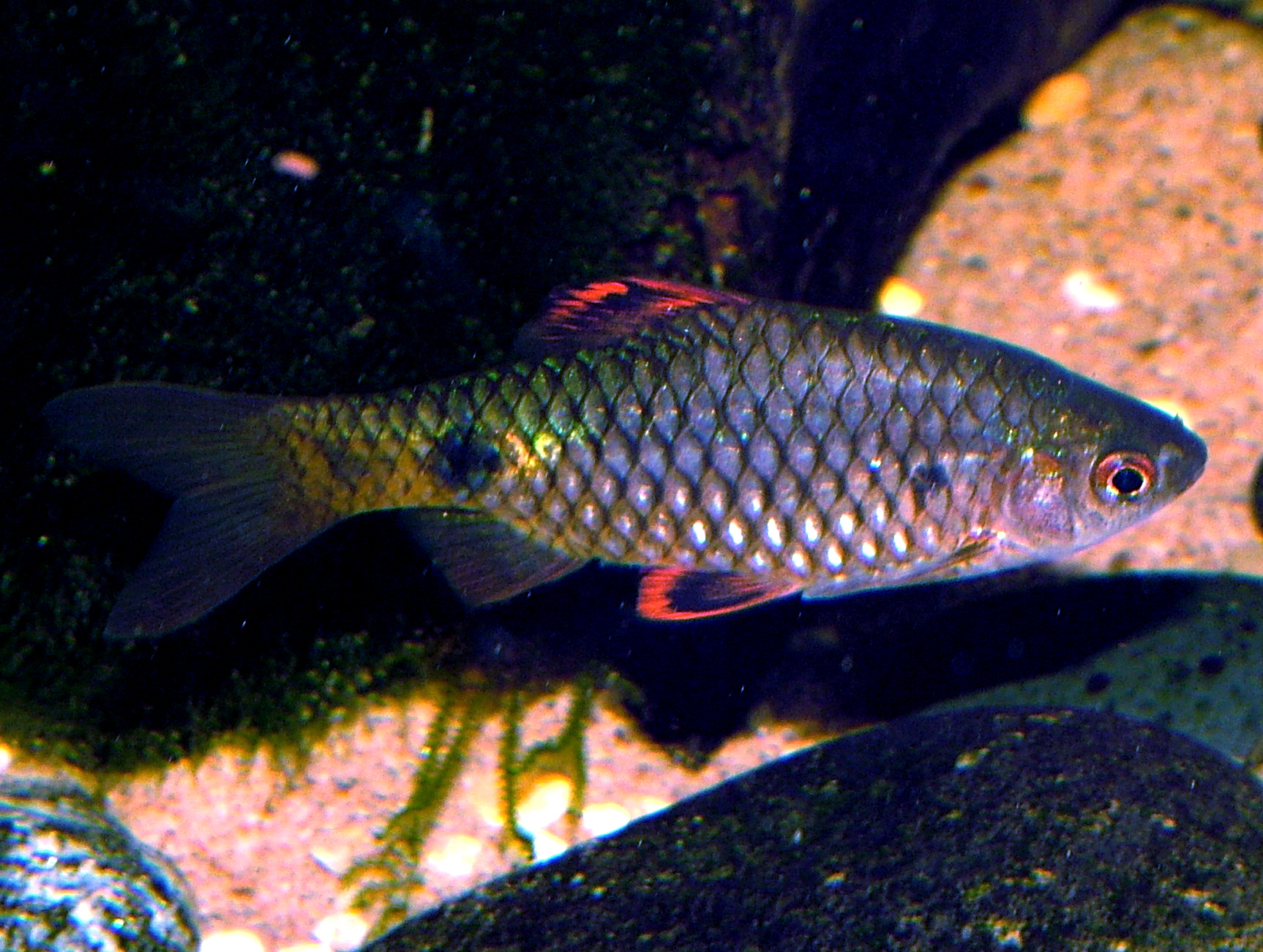
- P. stoliczkana

Conservation status
- Least Concern (IUCN 3.1)

Scientific classification
- Kingdom: Animalia
- Phylum: Chordata
- Class: Actinopterygii
- Order: Cypriniformes
- Family: Cyprinidae
- Subfamily: Smiliogastrinae
- Genus: Pethia
- Species: P. stoliczkana

Binomial name
- Pethia stoliczkana (F. Day, 1871)

Synonyms
- Barbus stoliczkanus F. Day, 1871; Puntius stoliczkanus (F. Day, 1871); Puntius ticto stoliczkanus (F. Day, 1871)

= Pethia stoliczkana =

Species of fish

Pethia stoliczkana is a fresh water tropical cyprinid fish native to the upper Mekong, Salwen, Irrawaddy, Meklong and upper Charo Phraya basins in the countries of Nepal, India, Pakistan, Myanmar, Bangladesh, Laos, Thailand, China and Sri Lanka.

== Etymology ==
The fish is named for Ferdinand Stoliczka.

== Description ==
P. stoliczkana is silver-green with a vertically elongated black blotch behind the gill opening, and a vertically elongated black blotch on the caudal peduncle. The dorsal fin of a sexually active male is red with a black margin and two rows of black spots. It has no barbels and the last simple dorsal ray is serrated posteriorly. It grows to a maximum length of 5 centimetres (2.0 in) SL.

P. stoliczkana is of commercial importance in the fish keeping industry and is used to create hybrid variants of tiger barbs and other barbs.

This fish is one of many barbs that has recently undergone revision in their taxonomic classification and has been moved from the genus, Puntius to the genus Pethia. This species is frequently confused with P. ticto, the Ticto barb or Two-spot barb, a related and similar species from the same geographic region, the males of which lack the red-flushed dorsal fin of male P. stoliczkana. In the early aquarium literature P. stoliczkana was commonly misidentified as P. ticto and given the common name, Tic-Tac-Toe barb. As a result, this common name is often still applied to both species.

== See also ==
- List of freshwater aquarium fish species
