= Pethia canius =

Scientific classification
- Domain: Eukaryota
- Kingdom: Animalia
- Phylum: Chordata
- Class: Actinopterygii
- Order: Cypriniformes
- Family: Cyprinidae
- Subfamily: Smiliogastrinae
- Genus: Pethia
- Species: P. canius

Binomial name
- Pethia canius Hamilton, 1822

Synonyms
- Cyprinus canius Hamilton, 1822; Systomus canius (Hamilton, 1822)

Species of cyprinid fish

Pethia canius is a species of cyprinid fish native to India where it is found in sluggish streams in West Bengal, India. This species can reach a length of 3.0 centimetres (1.2 in) SL.
