= Pethia yuensis =

Conservation status
- Vulnerable (IUCN 3.1)

Scientific classification
- Kingdom: Animalia
- Phylum: Chordata
- Class: Actinopterygii
- Order: Cypriniformes
- Family: Cyprinidae
- Subfamily: Smiliogastrinae
- Genus: Pethia
- Species: P. yuensis

Binomial name
- Pethia yuensis (Arunkumar & Tombi Singh, 2003)

Synonyms
- Puntius yuensis Arunkumar & Tombi Singh, 2003; Puntius ornatus Vishwanath & Laisram, 2004; Pethia ornata (Vishwanath & Laisram, 2004)

Species of fish

Pethia yuensis is a species of cyprinid fish found in rivers in Manipur, India and possibly Yu Chaung near Yantan Village, Myanmar. It can grow to a length of 5.5 centimetres (2.2 in) SL.
