= Pethia expletiforis =

Scientific classification
- Domain: Eukaryota
- Kingdom: Animalia
- Phylum: Chordata
- Class: Actinopterygii
- Order: Cypriniformes
- Family: Cyprinidae
- Subfamily: Smiliogastrinae
- Genus: Pethia
- Species: P. expletiforis

Binomial name
- Pethia expletiforis Dishma & Vishwanath, 2013

Species of fish

Pethia expletiforis is a species of cyprinid fish native to India where it is found in streams in Mizoram, India.

== Size ==
This species can reach a length of 4.7 centimetres (1.9 in) SL.
