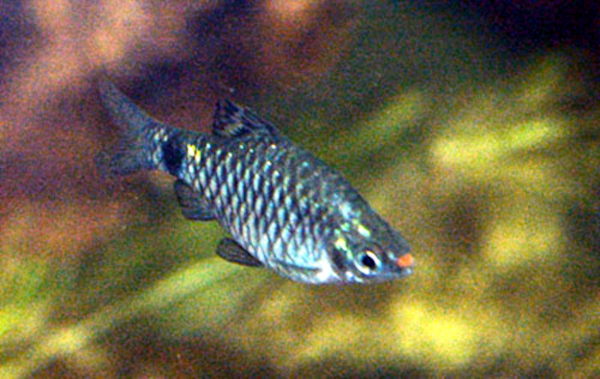

Conservation status
- Least Concern (IUCN 3.1)

Scientific classification
- Kingdom: Animalia
- Phylum: Chordata
- Class: Actinopterygii
- Order: Cypriniformes
- Family: Cyprinidae
- Subfamily: Smiliogastrinae
- Genus: Pethia
- Species: P. erythromycter

Binomial name
- Pethia erythromycter (S. O. Kullander, 2008)

Synonyms
- Puntius erythromycter S. O. Kullander, 2008

= Pethia erythromycter =

Species of fish

Pethia erythromycter is a species of cyprinid fish native to Myanmar where it is found in Myitkyina and Lake Indawgyi. This species can reach a length of 3.3 centimetres (1.3 in) SL.
