= Pethia striata =

Conservation status
- Endangered (IUCN 3.1)

Scientific classification
- Kingdom: Animalia
- Phylum: Chordata
- Class: Actinopterygii
- Order: Cypriniformes
- Family: Cyprinidae
- Subfamily: Smiliogastrinae
- Genus: Pethia
- Species: P. striata

Binomial name
- Pethia striata Atkore, Knight, Rema Devi & Krishnaswamy, 2015

Species of fish

Pethia striata. the Kudremukh barb, is a species of cyprinid fish found in the Tunga River basin in Karnataka, India. This species can reach 3.3 cm (1.3 in) standard length.
