= Pethia reval =

Conservation status
- Endangered (IUCN 3.1)

Scientific classification
- Kingdom: Animalia
- Phylum: Chordata
- Class: Actinopterygii
- Order: Cypriniformes
- Family: Cyprinidae
- Genus: Pethia
- Species: P. reval

Binomial name
- Pethia reval (Meegaskumbura, Anjana Silva, Maduwage & Pethiyagoda, 2008)

Species of fish

Pethia reval, the red-finned barb, or redfin two-banded carplet, is a species of cyprinid fish endemic to Sri Lanka. This species can reach a length of 3.4 centimetres (1.3 in) SL.

Congener, Pethia cumingii, also a Sri Lankan endemic, has long been presumed to be dichromatic with some populations exhibiting yellow fins and others displaying red fins. In 2008, the red-finned populations were elevated to the status of species and given the name, Pethia reval, while the yellow-finned form remains P. cumingii. It is P. reval, the red-finned species, that has been kept most frequently by aquarists since the 1930s though identified as P. cumingii throughout the aquarium literature and aquarium trade until recently.
