= Pethia thelys =

Conservation status
- Least Concern (IUCN 3.1)

Scientific classification
- Kingdom: Animalia
- Phylum: Chordata
- Class: Actinopterygii
- Order: Cypriniformes
- Family: Cyprinidae
- Subfamily: Smiliogastrinae
- Genus: Pethia
- Species: P. thelys

Binomial name
- Pethia thelys (S. O. Kullander, 2008)

Synonyms
- Puntius thelys S. O. Kullander, 2008

Species of fish

Pethia thelys is a species of cyprinid fish found in streams in Myitkyina and in Lake Indawgyi, Myanmar. This species can grow to a length of 4.2 centimetres (1.7 in) SL.
