= Pethia rutila =

Scientific classification
- Domain: Eukaryota
- Kingdom: Animalia
- Phylum: Chordata
- Class: Actinopterygii
- Order: Cypriniformes
- Family: Cyprinidae
- Subfamily: Smiliogastrinae
- Genus: Pethia
- Species: P. rutila

Binomial name
- Pethia rutila Lalramliana, Knight & Laltlanhlua, 2014

Species of fish

Pethia rutila is a species of cyprinid fish found in the Aivapui River and Keisalam River in the Karnaphuli River drainage in Mizoram, India.

This species of fish can reach a length of 4.5 centimetres (1.8 in) SL.
