= Shalyni barb =

Conservation status
- Vulnerable (IUCN 3.1)

Scientific classification
- Kingdom: Animalia
- Phylum: Chordata
- Class: Actinopterygii
- Order: Cypriniformes
- Family: Cyprinidae
- Subfamily: Smiliogastrinae
- Genus: Pethia
- Species: P. shalynius

Binomial name
- Pethia shalynius (Yazdani & Talukdar, 1975)

Synonyms
- Puntius shalynius Yazdani & Talukdar, 1975

Species of fish

The Shalyni barb (Pethia shalynius), is a species of cyprinid fish found in hill streams of Meghalaya, India, A report from Assam may be mistaken. This species grows to a length of 6 centimetres (2.4 in) TL. It is of minor importance to local commercial fisheries.
