= Pethia nankyweensis =

Conservation status
- Data Deficient (IUCN 3.1)

Scientific classification
- Kingdom: Animalia
- Phylum: Chordata
- Class: Actinopterygii
- Order: Cypriniformes
- Family: Cyprinidae
- Subfamily: Smiliogastrinae
- Genus: Pethia
- Species: P. nankyweensis

Binomial name
- Pethia nankyweensis (S. O. Kullander, 2008)

Synonyms
- Puntius nankyweensis S. O. Kullander, 2008

Species of fish

Pethia nankyweensis is a species of cyprinid fish found in Myanmar where it is known from smaller streams in the area of Myitkyina. This species reaches a length of 3.3 centimetres (1.3 in) SL.
