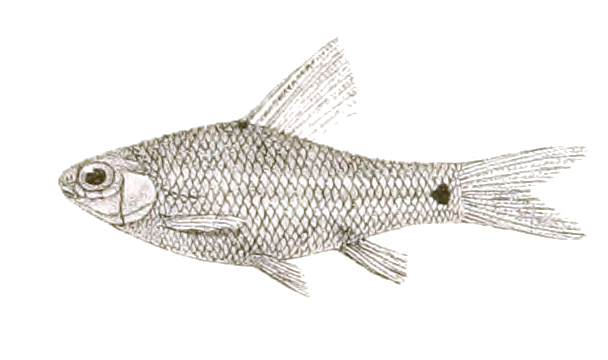

Conservation status
- Data Deficient (IUCN 3.1)

Scientific classification
- Kingdom: Animalia
- Phylum: Chordata
- Class: Actinopterygii
- Order: Cypriniformes
- Family: Cyprinidae
- Genus: Pethia
- Species: P. ambassis

Binomial name
- Pethia ambassis (F. Day, 1869)

Synonyms
- Barbus ambassis Day, 1869; Puntius ambassis (Day, 1869)

= Pethia ambassis =

Species of fish

Pethia ambassis is a species of ray-finned fish in the genus Pethia from India.
