= Pethia didi =

Conservation status
- Least Concern (IUCN 3.1)

Scientific classification
- Kingdom: Animalia
- Phylum: Chordata
- Class: Actinopterygii
- Order: Cypriniformes
- Family: Cyprinidae
- Subfamily: Smiliogastrinae
- Genus: Pethia
- Species: P. didi

Binomial name
- Pethia didi (S. O. Kullander & F. Fang, 2005)

Synonyms
- Puntius didi S. O. Kullander & F. Fang, 2005

Species of fish

Pethia didi is a species of cyprinid fish which has only been recorded in the vicinity of Myitkyina and Indawgyi Lake in the north of Myanmar.

This is a small fish which can reach a length of 4 centimetres (1.6 in) SL. It is generally brownish with a dark vertical bar just behind the operculum and a round dark blotch on the caudal peduncle. The species P. tiantian – with a range close to P. didi – is similarly marked, but P. didi can be distinguished by its truncated lateral line, deeper body and longer dorsal fin, with two rows of dark markings rather than one.
