= Pethia aurea =

Scientific classification
- Kingdom: Animalia
- Phylum: Chordata
- Class: Actinopterygii
- Division: Teleostei
- Order: Cypriniformes
- Family: Cyprinidae
- Genus: Pethia
- Species: P. aurea

Binomial name
- Pethia aurea Knight, 2013

Species of fish

Pethia aurea is a species of cyprinid fish. It is found in sluggish streams in West Bengal, India. This species can reach a length of 2.4 centimetres (0.94 in) SL.
