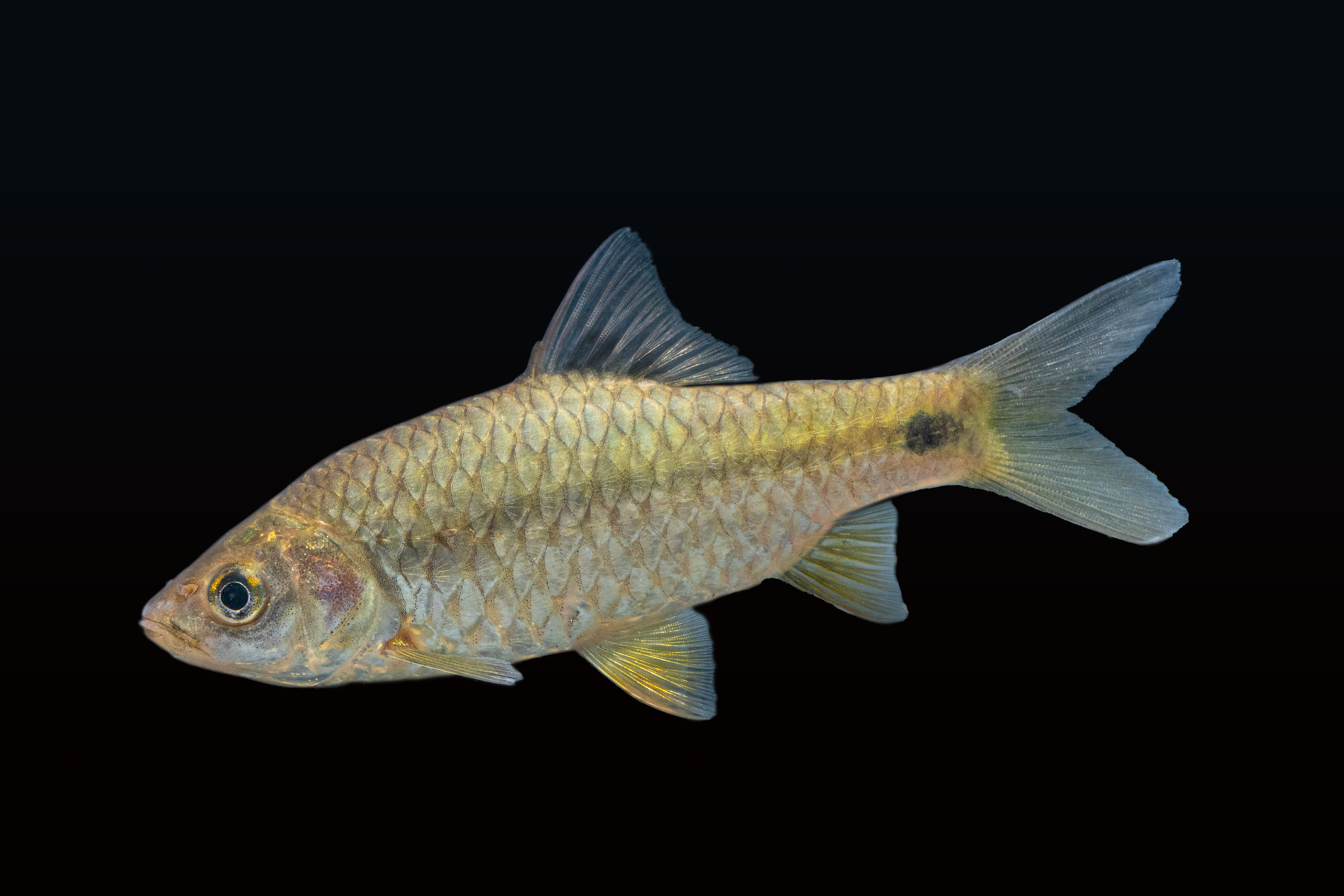

Conservation status
- Least Concern (IUCN 3.1)

Scientific classification
- Kingdom: Animalia
- Phylum: Chordata
- Class: Actinopterygii
- Order: Cypriniformes
- Family: Cyprinidae
- Subfamily: Smiliogastrinae
- Genus: Puntius
- Species: P. chola

Binomial name
- Puntius chola (F. Hamilton, 1822)
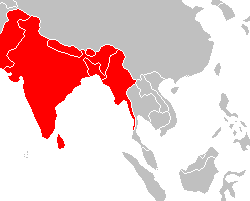
- Nations where Puntius chola can be found

Synonyms
- Cyprinus chola (Hamilton, 1822); Puntius titius (Hamilton, 1822); Barbus chola (Hamilton, 1822); Capoeta chola (Hamilton, 1822); Barbus titius (Hamilton, 1822)

= Swamp barb =

Species of fish

The swamp barb (Puntius chola), also known as chola barb, is a species of tropical freshwater fish belonging to the subfamily Cyprininae of the family Cyprinidae. It originates in inland waters in Asia, and is found in Pakistan, India, Nepal, Bangladesh, Sri Lanka, Bhutan, and Myanmar.

== Description ==
Swamp barbs will grow in length up to 6 inches (15 cm) and weigh up to 60 grams (2.1 oz).

== Habitat ==
It is found in streams, rivers, canals, mangroves, marshes, swamps, ponds, and inundated fields, mainly in shallow water. They live in a tropical climate in water with a 6.0 - 6.5 pH, a water hardness of 8 - 15 dGH, and a temperature range of 68–77 °F (20–25 °C). It feeds on worms, benthic crustaceans, insects, and plant matter.

== Breeding ==
The swamp barb is an open water, substrate egg-scatterer, and adults do not guard the eggs.

During breeding time, the males display very prominent red bands, which lasts for around two days (rivaling Rosy Barbs - P. conchonius), while females display red stripes which last around 5 hours.

== Importance to humans ==
The swamp barb is of commercial importance in the aquarium trade, the fisheries industry and as live feed for Arowana and other species of predatory aquarium fishes.

== See also ==
- List of freshwater aquarium fish species

== Further info ==
For colour photos of P. chola in courtship, see: Nuptial colouration and courtship behaviour during induced breeding of the swamp barb Puntius chola, a freshwater fish by Vincent, Moncey & Thomas, John K. in Current Science Vol 94. p. 922. Published by the Indian Academy of Sciences, April 2008.
