= Glass barb =

Conservation status
- Least Concern (IUCN 3.1)

Scientific classification
- Kingdom: Animalia
- Phylum: Chordata
- Class: Actinopterygii
- Order: Cypriniformes
- Family: Cyprinidae
- Subfamily: Smiliogastrinae
- Genus: Pethia
- Species: P. guganio

Binomial name
- Pethia guganio (F. Hamilton, 1822)

Synonyms
- Cyprinus guganio Hamilton, 1822; Barbus guganio (Hamilton, 1822); Leuciscus guganio (Hamilton, 1822); Puntius guganio (Hamilton, 1822); Barbus carletoni Fowler, 1924; Puntius carletoni (Fowler, 1924); Barbus ambassis (non Day, 1869); Puntius ambassis (non Day, 1869)

Species of fish

Pethia guganio also called Glass barb is a species of ray-finned fish in the genus Pethia. It is found in India and Bangladesh.
