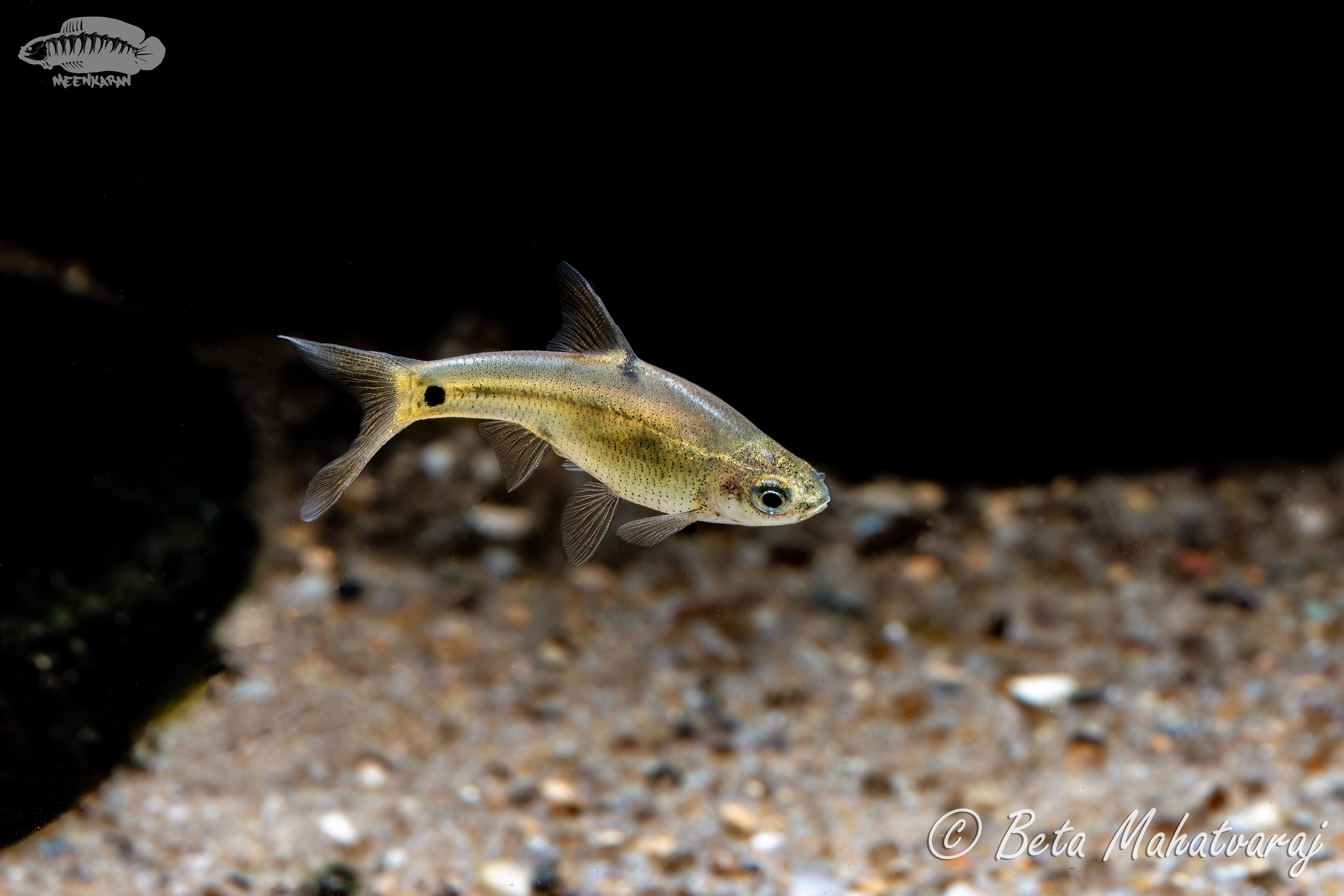

Conservation status
- Endangered (IUCN 3.1)

Scientific classification
- Kingdom: Animalia
- Phylum: Chordata
- Class: Actinopterygii
- Order: Cypriniformes
- Family: Cyprinidae
- Subfamily: Smiliogastrinae
- Genus: Pethia
- Species: P. sharmai

Binomial name
- Pethia sharmai (Menon & Rema Devi, 1993)

Synonyms
- Puntius sharmai Menon & Rema Devi, 1993

= Pethia sharmai =

Species of fish

Pethia sharmai, the Chennai sawfin barb, is a species of ray-finned fish in the genus Pethia. It is found in Tamil Nadu, India.
