= Pethia tiantian =

Conservation status
- Near Threatened (IUCN 3.1)

Scientific classification
- Kingdom: Animalia
- Phylum: Chordata
- Class: Actinopterygii
- Order: Cypriniformes
- Family: Cyprinidae
- Subfamily: Smiliogastrinae
- Genus: Pethia
- Species: P. tiantian

Binomial name
- Pethia tiantian (S. O. Kullander & F. Fang, 2005)

Synonyms
- Puntius tiantian S. O. Kullander & F. Fang, 2005

Species of fish

Pethia tiantian, the Burmese bumblebee barb, is a species of cyprinid fish that has only been recorded from streams in the vicinity of Putao in the far north of Myanmar. It grows to a length of 4.5 centimetres (1.8 in) SL.

It is generally brownish with a dark vertical bar just behind the operculum and a round dark blotch on the caudal peduncle. Other Pethia species are similarly marked but P. tiantian can be distinguished by its longer lateral line, reaching all the way back to the base of the caudal fin. P. didi, a similarly marked species found in the same drainage basin, differs from P. tiantian in having a deeper body and a longer dorsal fin with two rows of dark markings rather than one.
