= Pethia macrogramma =

Conservation status
- Data Deficient (IUCN 3.1)

Scientific classification
- Kingdom: Animalia
- Phylum: Chordata
- Class: Actinopterygii
- Order: Cypriniformes
- Family: Cyprinidae
- Subfamily: Smiliogastrinae
- Genus: Pethia
- Species: P. macrogramma

Binomial name
- Pethia macrogramma (S. O. Kullander, 2008)

Synonyms
- Puntius macrogramma S. O. Kullander, 2008

Species of fish

Pethia macrogramma is a species of cyprinid fish native to Myanmar where it is only known from streams in the Myitkyina area. It can reach a length of 5.1 centimetres (2.0 in) SL.
