= Pethia dibrugarhensis =

Scientific classification
- Kingdom: Animalia
- Phylum: Chordata
- Class: Actinopterygii
- Order: Cypriniformes
- Family: Cyprinidae
- Genus: Pethia
- Species: P. dibrugarhensis

Binomial name
- Pethia dibrugarhensis Sharma, Vishwanath, Dishma, Borah & Das, 2025

Species of freshwater fish

Pethia dibrugarhensis is a species of freshwater fish belonging to the family Cyprinidae. It was first described in the Dibrugarh district of Assam, India, from which its name is derived.

The species is found in small rivers and streams that have clear, slow flowing water. Pethia dibrugarhensis is a small barb known for its laterally compressed body and distinctive color markings.
