= Pethia melanomaculata =

Conservation status
- Least Concern (IUCN 3.1)

Scientific classification
- Kingdom: Animalia
- Phylum: Chordata
- Class: Actinopterygii
- Division: Teleostei
- Order: Cypriniformes
- Family: Cyprinidae
- Subfamily: Smiliogastrinae
- Genus: Pethia
- Species: P. melanomaculata

Binomial name
- Pethia melanomaculata (Deraniyagala, 1956)

Synonyms
- Puntius melanomaculatus Deraniyagala, 1956

Species of fish

Pethia melanomaculata, the Tic-tac-toe barb, is a species of cyprinid fish endemic to Sri Lanka.
