= Pethia manipurensis =

Conservation status
- Endangered (IUCN 3.1)

Scientific classification
- Kingdom: Animalia
- Phylum: Chordata
- Class: Actinopterygii
- Order: Cypriniformes
- Family: Cyprinidae
- Subfamily: Smiliogastrinae
- Genus: Pethia
- Species: P. manipurensis

Binomial name
- Pethia manipurensis (Menon, Rema Devi & Vishwanath, 2000)

Synonyms
- Puntius manipurensis Menon, Rema Devi & Vishwanath, 2000

Species of fish

Pethia manipurensis is a species of cyprinid native to India where it is only known from Loktak Lake. This species can reach a length of 6.2 centimetres (2.4 in) SL.
