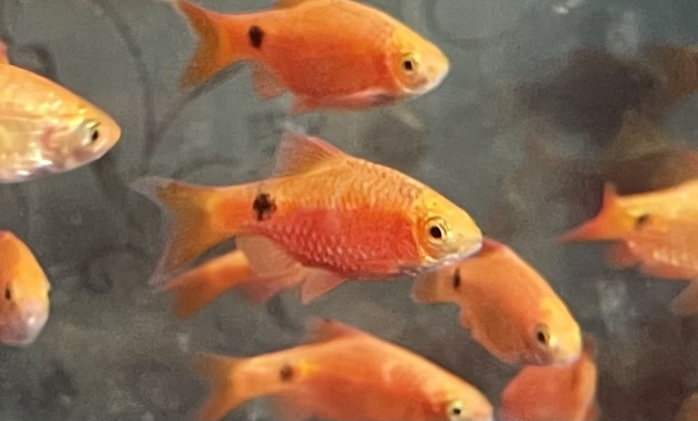

Conservation status
- Least Concern (IUCN 3.1)

Scientific classification
- Kingdom: Animalia
- Phylum: Chordata
- Class: Actinopterygii
- Order: Cypriniformes
- Family: Cyprinidae
- Subfamily: Smiliogastrinae
- Genus: Pethia
- Species: P. conchonius

Binomial name
- Pethia conchonius (F. Hamilton, 1822)

Synonyms
- Cyprinus conchonius F. Hamilton, 1822; Systomus conchonius (F. Hamilton, 1822); Barbus conchonius (F. Hamilton, 1822); Puntius conchonius (F. Hamilton, 1822); Puntius conchonius khagariansis (Datta Munshi & Srivastava, 1988)

= Rosy barb =

Species of fish

The rosy barb (Pethia conchonius) is a subtropical freshwater cyprinid fish found in southern Asia from Afghanistan to Bangladesh.

== Description ==
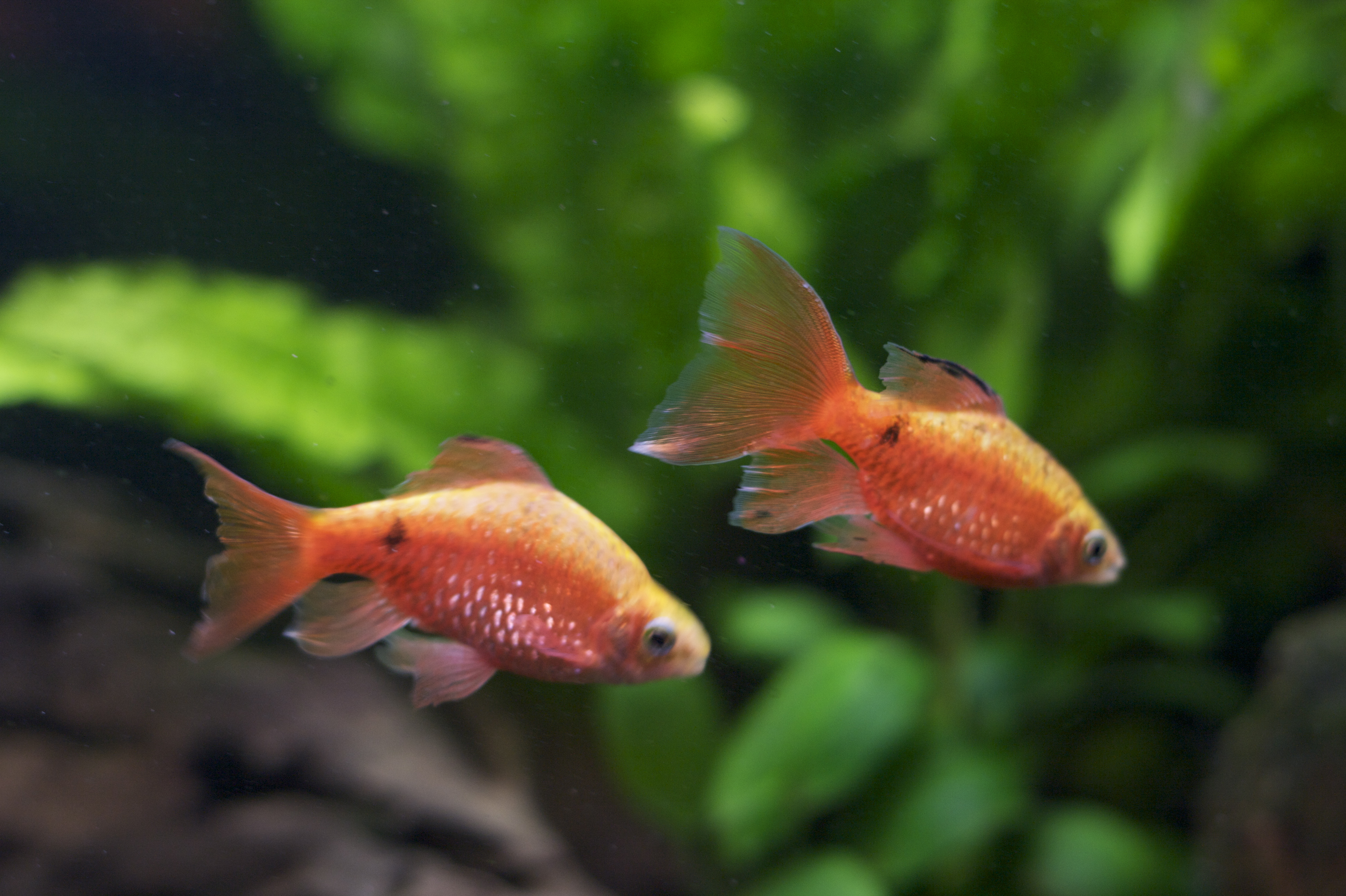
A pair of longfinned rosy barbs.

This species of barb grows up to 6 inches (15 cm) in length. Juveniles possess large, deeply forked tails, which are large in proportion to their body. Their colour becomes bolder during their mating periods. Males have more vibrant colours and females are slightly plumper. Also note that females do not have any black colour in their fins while males do. They may weigh up to 340 grams (12 oz) when fully grown but can weigh much less during adolescence. They are mature at 63.5 mm (2.50 in).

== Habitat ==
In the wild their omnivorous diet consists of worms, insects, crustaceans, and plant matter. They have a lifespan of up to 5 years. Rosy barbs natively live in lakes and fast flowing water in a subtropical climate. Their natural habitat has a pH of 6 to 8, a water hardness of 5-19 dGH, and a temperature range of 64–72 °F (18–22 °C).

== Importance to humans ==
The fish has commercial importance in the aquarium trade and is one of several species of barbs used to create hybrid versions of "tiger barbs".

== Breeding ==
When the female is ready to spawn, she will appear swollen with eggs. The males will circle and chase the females, repeatedly nudging her head and belly area. Spawning usually occurs in the early morning, and lasts several hours resulting in several hundred eggs. Eggs are usually deposited in groups of plants, and the pair will attempt to eat any that they are able to locate.

The young hatch in 24 to 36 hours, depending on water temperature. A day later, the young fish will hang on the plants, and/or the sides of the tank if the breeding takes place in an aquarium. In about six days the young are free-swimming and will seek out food. In captivity, they can be fed newly hatched brine shrimp.

Rosy barb has been successfully hybridized with the tiger barb (Puntius tetrazona), i.e. crossing female tiger barb with male rosy barb. The hybrids reached maturity and were all males, however they were sterile.

== In the aquarium ==
The rosy barb is an active, peaceful species well-suited for a community aquarium. It is considered one of the hardiest barbs, undemanding and beautiful, and most impressively colored during the mating period. It can be kept together with other small fish but can be aggressive toward other fish and nip their fins. They will eat most foods provided to them. They are best kept in groups of 5 or more in an aquarium with a length of at least 76 cm (30 in). They usually reach a maximum size of 10.2 cm (4.0 in). Using a dark-colored gravel will show off the color of the fish.

The Rosy Barbs also act like they are constantly hungry and will swarm to the front of the tank when it sees the owner so care needs to be taken to ensure not to over feed.

== See also ==
- List of freshwater aquarium fish species
