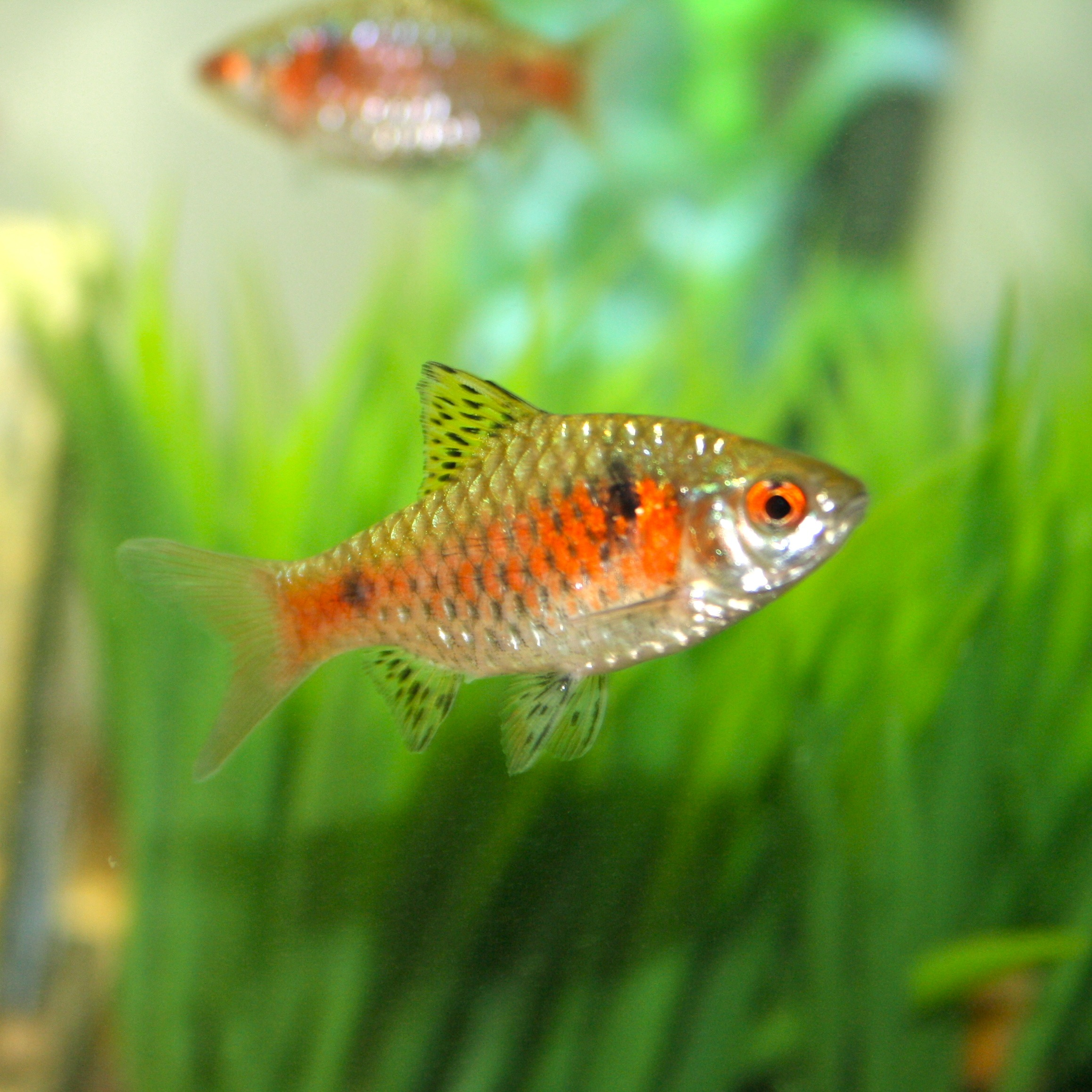
- Odessa barb males show very bright red coloration

Conservation status
- Data Deficient (IUCN 3.1)

Scientific classification
- Kingdom: Animalia
- Phylum: Chordata
- Class: Actinopterygii
- Order: Cypriniformes
- Family: Cyprinidae
- Subfamily: Smiliogastrinae
- Genus: Pethia
- Species: P. padamya

Binomial name
- Pethia padamya (S. O. Kullander & Britz, 2008)

Synonyms
- Puntius padamya S. O. Kullander & Britz, 2008

= Odessa barb =

Species of fish

The Odessa barb (Pethia padamya) is a species of cyprinid fish known from Central Myanmar, where it is known to occur in an artificial pond above the Anisakan Falls and also from the lower Chindwin River. For many years it has been known to the aquarium hobby, where it has frequently been confused with the less colourful ticto barb, but it was only described scientifically in 2008.

== Description ==
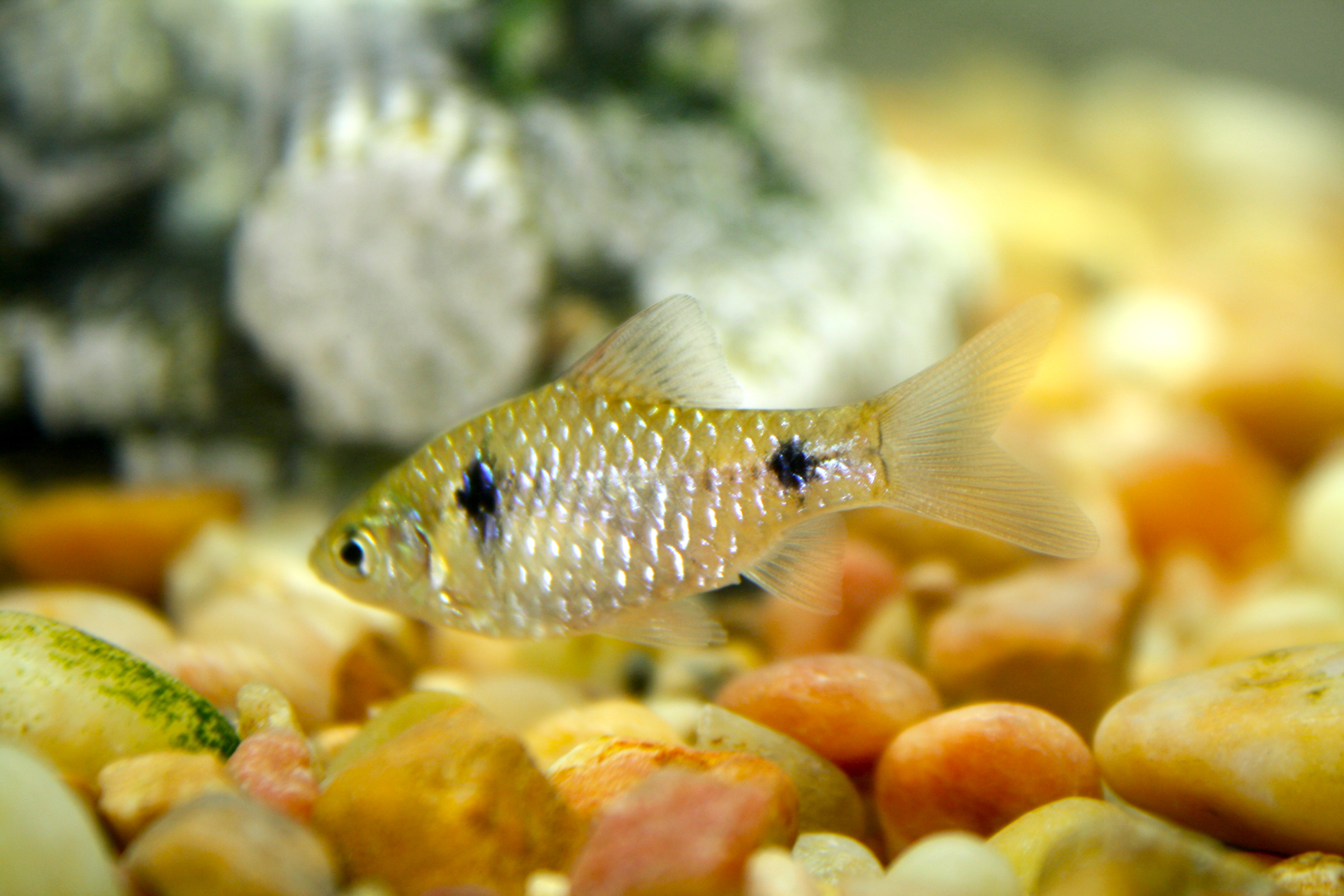
Female Odessa barb

The Odessa barb is a small fish with a laterally compressed body. Among 28 adult specimens (12 males, 16 females) measured in its species description, both sexes were up to about 4.6 centimetres (1.8 in) SL. Hobby aquarist profiles have noted a length of 7 centimetres (2.8 in) SL. This species exhibits sexual dimorphism, which allows for easy identification of the sexes.

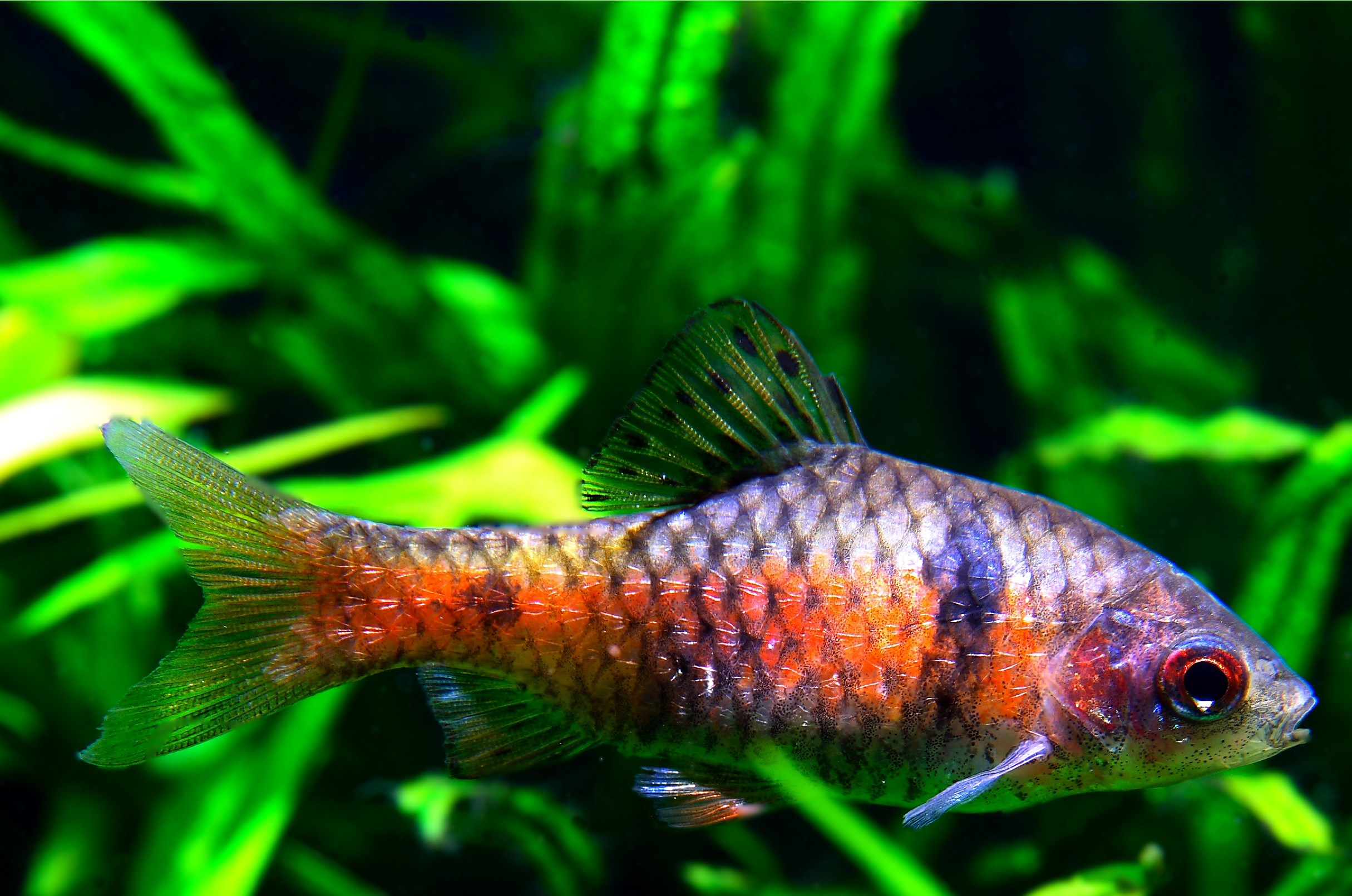
Male Odessa barb

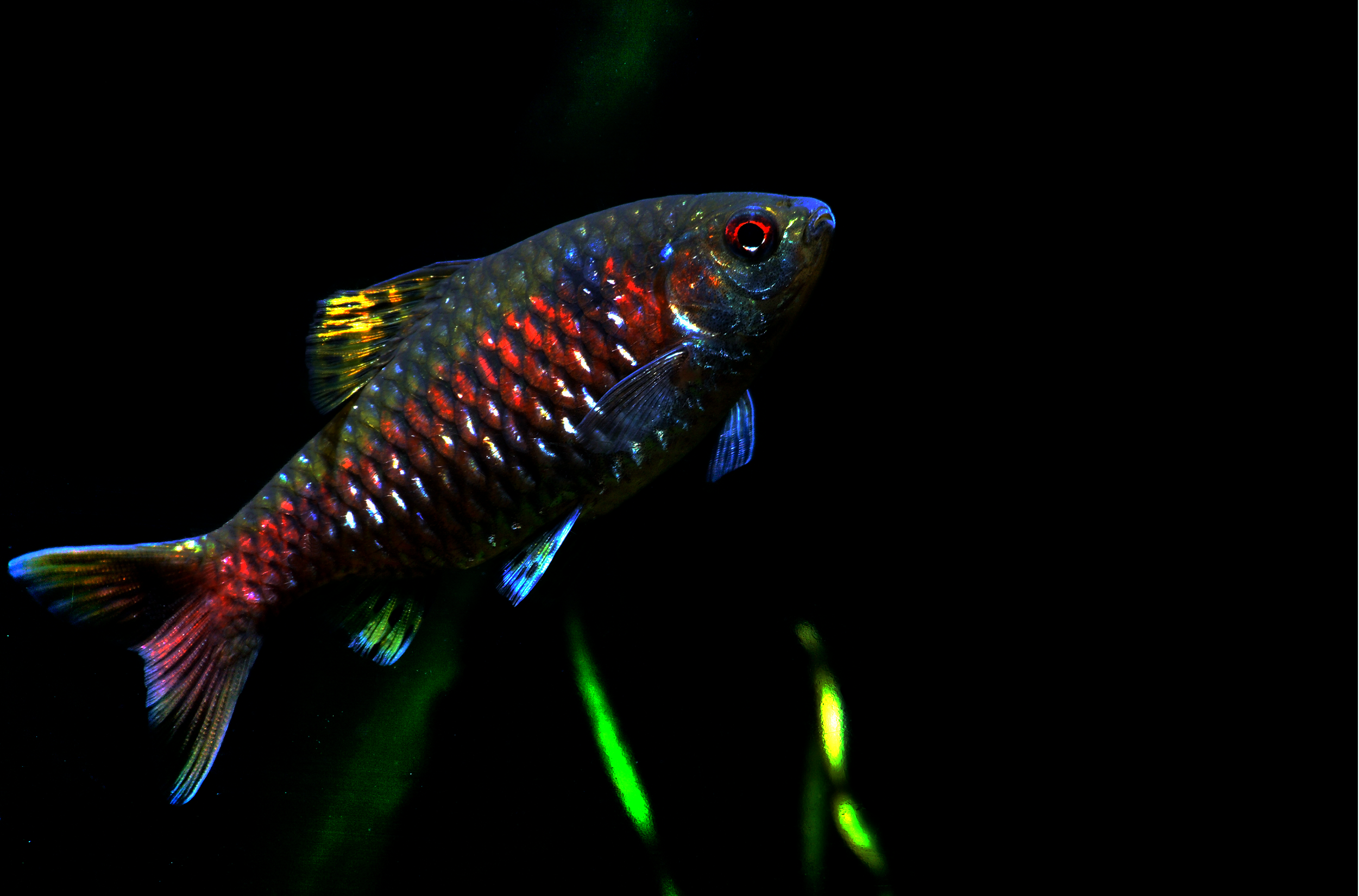
Another male Odessa barb

The male has a beige to light brown background color, but is noted for the bright red stripe running the length of the body. The male also has red irises with a narrow black streak through the middle of the eye. The dorsal, anal, and pelvic fins of the male are yellowish green in color, with contrasting black spots. When in spawning condition, the body coloration can intensify with the background becoming darker and the red intensifying on the lateral stripe.

The female is plainly colored, with a light beige body and a reflecting silvery sheen on the scales. The fins of the female are a light yellowish green; however, only the dorsal fin contains the contrasting black spots, which are fainter than those of the male. Both sexes have a black and prominent spot in the dorsal area, as well as a smaller spot in the caudal area.

== Etymology ==
This fish is known by the ornamental fish species name "Odessa barb" because it was said to have first appeared in pet enthusiast's circles in Odesa, Ukraine in the early 1970s.

The genus name Pethia refers to a group of small sized barbs present predominantly in South and Southeast Asia. The species name "padamya" is Burmese for ruby, and was chosen in reference to the alternate ornamental fish name "ruby barb" and the vivid color marking of the male.

== In the aquarium ==
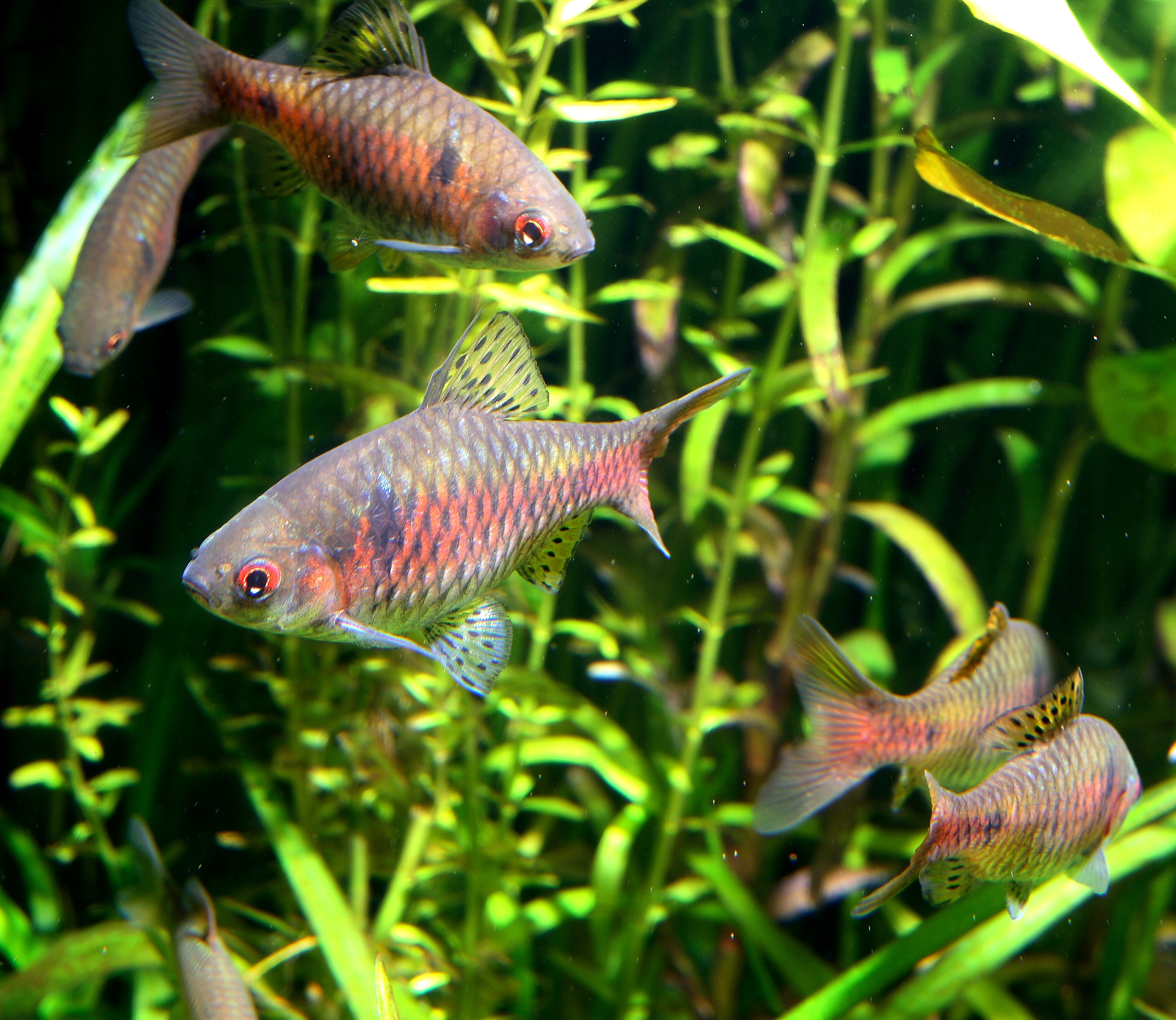
Colony of Odessa barb in a home aquarium

Like most barbs, the Odessa barb is an active and generally peaceful fish that is best kept in a community tank. It is a schooling fish that can become semi-aggressive towards other tank mates if it is not kept in groups of 5 or more individuals. As this fish is fast moving, it is best kept in a tank with open spaces, but ample hiding spaces with driftwood or plants is recommended as the fish tend to be skittish if the tank is too bare. A tightly fitted aquarium lid is recommended as well as the fish are prodigious jumpers.

The Odessa barb is a voracious eater that will take most foods given, including flakes and frozen foods, such as Bloodworms. The Odessa barb can be kept with other peaceful fish species including various Tetras, various Corydoras catfish, danios, and the Ram cichlid. A selectively bred strain has been created in North America by Select Aquatics where males have a more vivid red body stripe with darker body coloration.

== Breeding ==
The Odessa barb is an egg scatterer that will lay eggs typically on clumps of plant matter such as moss or other aquatic plants. The parents exhibit no parental care and will eat any laid eggs they find. The young typically hatch in 24 hours and would initially require microscopic food items.

Depending on the temperature, food provided, and water quality, the fry will mature within 5–8 months.

== See also ==
- Barb
- List of freshwater aquarium fish species
