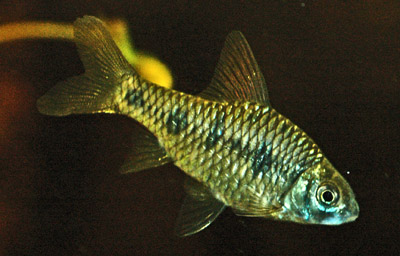

Conservation status
- Least Concern (IUCN 3.1)

Scientific classification
- Kingdom: Animalia
- Phylum: Chordata
- Class: Actinopterygii
- Order: Cypriniformes
- Family: Cyprinidae
- Subfamily: Smiliogastrinae
- Genus: Waikhomia
- Species: W. sahyadriensis

Binomial name
- Waikhomia sahyadriensis Silas, 1953

= Khavli barb =

Species of fish

The Khavli barb or Indian maharaja barb (Waikhomia sahyadriensis) is a species of ray-finned fish in the genus Puntius. It is found in Maharashtra, India.

Reportedly, the scientific name of this species has been changed recently by a group of Indian ichthyologists. This species is now placed under the newly described genus Waikhomia, which is in the honour of ace Indian ichthyologist Vishwanath Waikhom. He has described over 100 species of fish from India. The newly accepted scientific name for the species is Waikhomia sahyadriensis.
