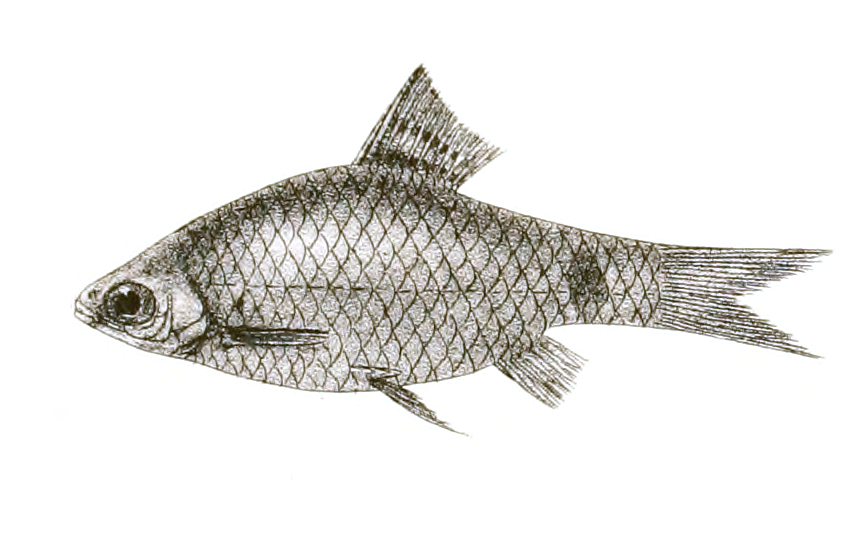

Conservation status
- Least Concern (IUCN 3.1)

Scientific classification
- Kingdom: Animalia
- Phylum: Chordata
- Class: Actinopterygii
- Order: Cypriniformes
- Family: Cyprinidae
- Subfamily: Smiliogastrinae
- Genus: Pethia
- Species: P. punctata

Binomial name
- Pethia punctata (F. Day, 1865)

Synonyms
- Pethia muvattupuzhaensis Jameela Beevi & Ramachandran, 2005; Puntius punctatus Day, 1865; Puntius ticto punctatus Day, 1865; Barbus punctatus Day, 1865

= Pethia punctata =

Species of fish

Pethia punctata, the dotted sawfin barb, is a species of cyprinid fish found in streams and ponds of the Western Ghats of India. There have also been unconfirmed reports that it is also present in Sri Lanka. This species can reach a length of 7.5 centimetres (3.0 in) TL.
