= Pethia meingangbii =

Conservation status
- Least Concern (IUCN 3.1)

Scientific classification
- Kingdom: Animalia
- Phylum: Chordata
- Class: Actinopterygii
- Order: Cypriniformes
- Family: Cyprinidae
- Subfamily: Smiliogastrinae
- Genus: Pethia
- Species: P. meingangbii

Binomial name
- Pethia meingangbii (Arunkumar & Tombi Singh, 2003)

Synonyms
- Puntius meingangbii Arunkumar & Tombi Singh, 2003

Species of fish

Pethia meingangbii is a species of cyprinid native to freshwater habitats in Manipur in northeastern India and Myanmar.

It is known from nine locations, but it is common in these areas and lacks major threats. It is sometimes caught and eaten by locals.
