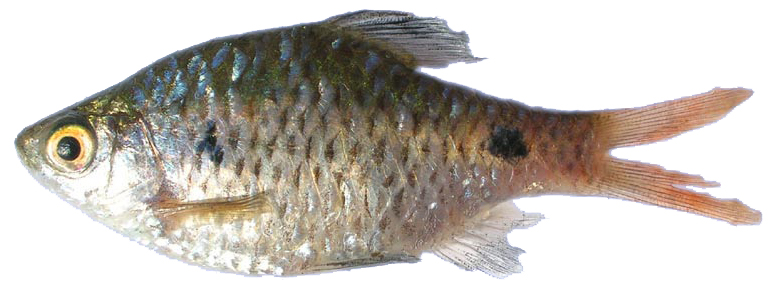

Conservation status
- Least Concern (IUCN 3.1)

Scientific classification
- Kingdom: Animalia
- Phylum: Chordata
- Class: Actinopterygii
- Order: Cypriniformes
- Family: Cyprinidae
- Subfamily: Smiliogastrinae
- Genus: Pethia
- Species: P. ticto

Binomial name
- Pethia ticto (F. Hamilton, 1822)

Synonyms
- Cyprinus ticto F. Hamilton, 1822; Barbus ticto (F. Hamilton, 1822); Puntius ticto (F. Hamilton, 1822); Puntius ticto ticto (F. Hamilton, 1822); Rothee ticto (F. Hamilton, 1822); Systomus ticto (F. Hamilton, 1822); Systomus tripunctatus Jerdon, 1849

= Ticto barb =

Species of fish

The ticto barb or twospot barb (Pethia ticto) is a species of subtropical freshwater fish belonging to the family Cyprinidae. It is a native of the upper Mekong, Salwen, Irrawaddy, Meklong and upper Charo Phraya basins in the countries of Nepal, India, Pakistan, Myanmar, Bangladesh, Thailand, and Sri Lanka. It has frequently been confused with the Odessa barb in the aquarium trade, but in that species the male is reddish-orange (lacking in P. ticto).

The ticto barb is silver and gold with two black spots; one just before the pectoral fin and one near the back tail. It grows to a maximum length of 10 cm (4 in).

It is natively found in still, shallow, marginal waters of lakes and rivers, usually with muddy bottoms. It browses close to the substrate in shallow water. Ticto barbs natively live in a subtropical environment and prefer water with a 6.0—7.0 pH, a water hardness of up to 10 dGH, and a temperature range of 14–22 °C (57–72 °F). Their diet consists of small crustaceans, insects and plankton.

The ticto barb is one of many barbs undergoing revisions in their taxonomic classification. It is frequently confused with its sympatric relative P. stoliczkana.

== In the aquarium ==
The ticto barb is an active schooling fish, which is usually kept in groups. When in large enough groups, they will not bother any other species of fish. They prefer a well planted environment that is similar to the still and shallow waters with mud bottoms of their native habitat.

Ticto barbs are egg-layers that spawn among a coarse gravel bed. During spawning, they will lay approximately 150 eggs, laying around 20 at a time. Once spawning is finished, they will usually eat any of the eggs that they find. It is usually necessary to separate the fish from the eggs after spawning in order to prevent the eggs from being eaten. The eggs will hatch in approximately 1 day and will be free-swimming a day later.

== See also ==
- List of freshwater aquarium fish species
