= Rajeev Raghavan =

Indian conservation biologist

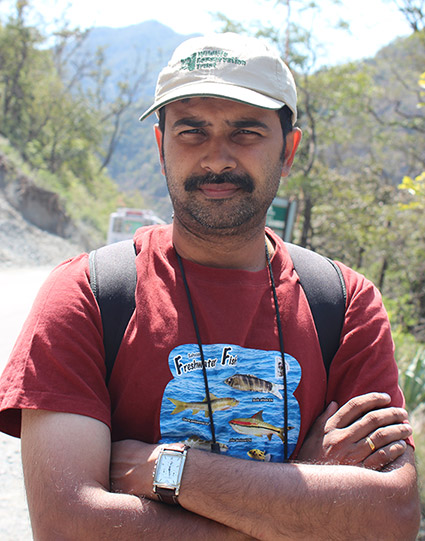
- Born: Kerala State, Kochi, India
- Occupations: Assistant Professor, Fisheries Scientist
- Known for: Freshwater Fish Conservation, Fish Systematics
- Board member of: Mahseer Trust, SHOAL Conservation, Freshwater Life, Fisheries Conservation Foundation
- Awards: FSBI MEDAL 2023

Academic background
- Education: St. Albert's College, University of Madras, Wuhan Institute of Hydrobiology, University of Kent

Academic work
- Discipline: Conservation Biology, Fisheries science
- Sub-discipline: Freshwater Fish Conservation, Fish Systematics, Molecular ecology, Inland Fisheries
- Institutions: Kerala University of Fisheries and Ocean Studies International Union for Conservation of Nature
- Website: https://www.fishlab.in

Rajeev Raghavan is a fisheries scientist and aquatic conservation biologist known for his work on the freshwater fishes of the Indian subcontinent. Rajeev is currently an assistant professor at the Kerala University of Fisheries and Ocean Studies, Kochi, India, the South Asia Chair of the IUCN's Freshwater Fish Specialist Group., and the IUCN Freshwater Fish Red List Authority Coordinator for Asia and Oceania.

Rajeev has to his credit more than 200 publications and has been listed in the Elsevier/Scopus Top 2% Scientists of the World for the years 2020, 2021 and 2022.

In honour of Rajeev's research contributions to Indian ichthyology, two fish species have been named after him - a snakehead from the northern Western Ghats, Channa rara, and a hill-stream loach Indoreonectes rajeevi.

== Research ==
Since 2003, Rajeev has been involved in interdisciplinary research that generates information to support conservation decision making in tropical aquatic ecosystems, particularly in the Western Ghats Biodiversity Hotspot. His work cuts across multiple disciplines from systematics, to molecular ecology and biogeography, freshwater fisheries and conservation policies. His research group is globally recognized for advancing the knowledge-base on understanding the diversity of freshwater fishes on the Indian subcontinent, resulting in the discovery and description of 21 new species (including three new genera and two new families). Working with collaborators, he has also contributed to solving long-standing taxonomic and nomenclatural issues in Indian fish taxonomy.
