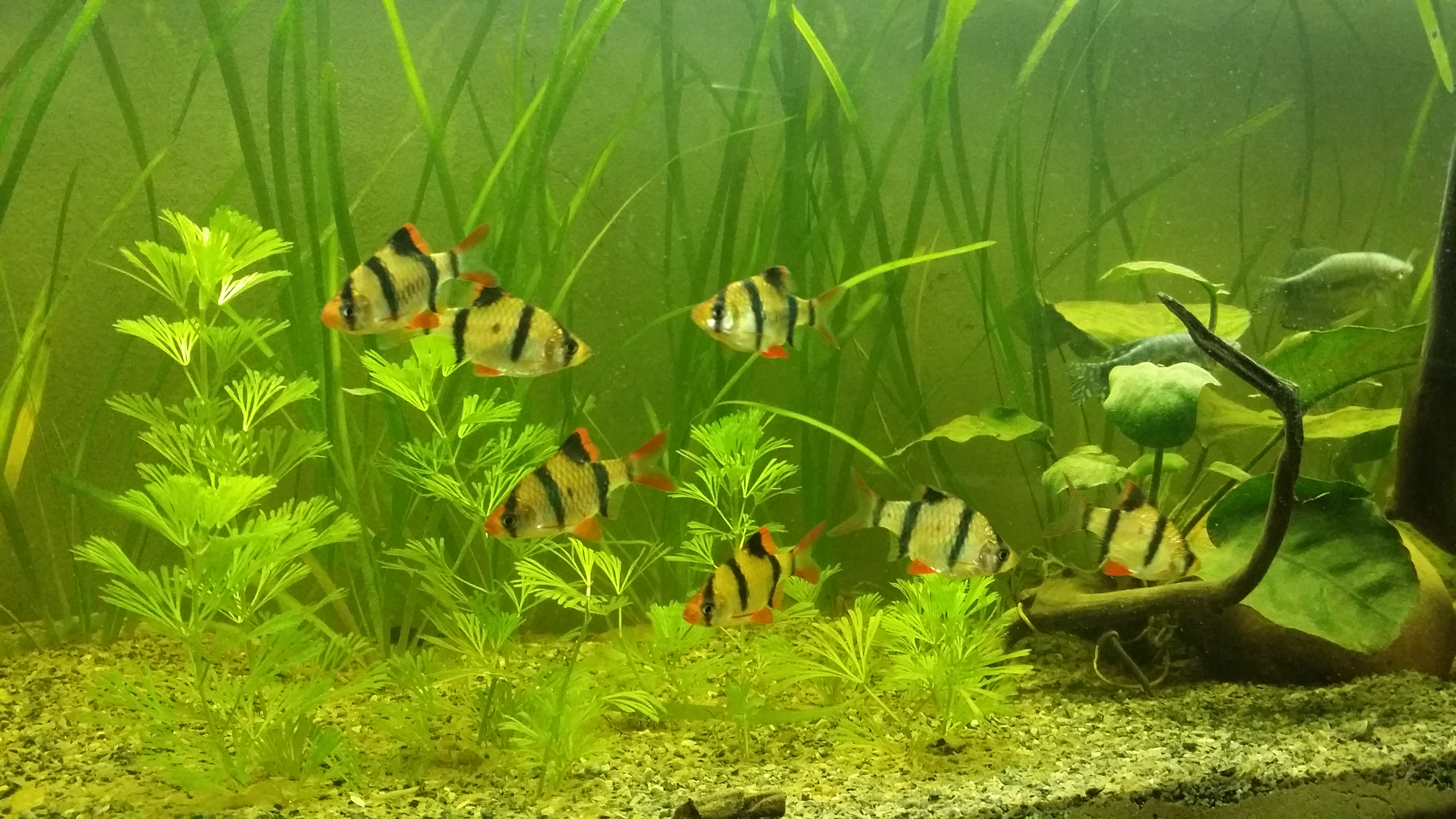
- Tiger barb schooling

Conservation status
- Least Concern (IUCN 3.1)

Scientific classification
- Kingdom: Animalia
- Phylum: Chordata
- Class: Actinopterygii
- Division: Teleostei
- Order: Cypriniformes
- Family: Cyprinidae
- Subfamily: Smiliogastrinae
- Genus: Puntigrus
- Species: P. tetrazona

Binomial name
- Puntigrus tetrazona (Bleeker, 1855)

Synonyms
- Capoeta tetrazona Bleeker, 1855; Barbus tetrazona (Bleeker, 1855); Barbus tetrazona tetrazona (Bleeker, 1855); Puntius tetrazona (Bleeker, 1855); Systomus tetrazona (Bleeker, 1855)

= Tiger barb =

Species of fish

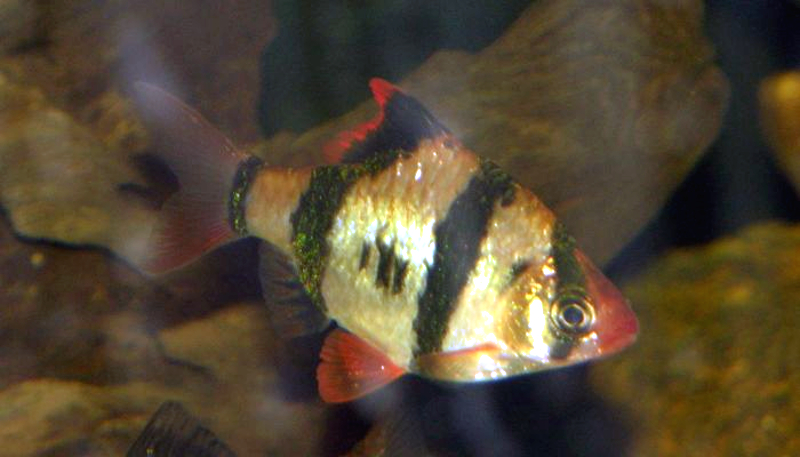
Tiger barb in an aquarium

The tiger barb or Sumatra barb (Puntigrus tetrazona), is a species of tropical cyprinid fish.

== "Tiger Barb" Disambiguation ==
The genus Puntigrus was erected in 2013 to hold several species previous identified as P. tetrazona, and members of the genus are sometimes referred to broadly as tiger barbs.

Members of this genus, including Puntigrus anchisporus, Puntigrus navjotsodhii, and Puntigrus partipentazona, are similar in appearance to Puntius tetrazona, with only slight differences in stripe pattern and number of scales.

== Geographic Range ==
The fish is endemic to the southern portion of the eastern slope of Sumatra in Indonesia, where it is recorded from the Kampar, Siak, Indragiri, Batanghari, Musi, Tulangbawang, and Way Sekampung basins. Tiger barbs are also found in other parts of Asia, such as in Singapore where it has definitely been introduced, hence definite conclusions about their natural geographic range versus established introductions are difficult.

== Description ==
The tiger barb can grow to about 7–10 centimeters (2.8–3.9 inches) long and 3–4 centimeters (1.2–1.6 inches) wide, although they are often smaller when kept in captivity. Some can grow to around 13 centimeters as well. Native fish are silver to brownish yellow with four vertical black stripes and red fins and snout. The green tiger barb is the same size and has the same nature as the normal barb, but has a green body. The green tiger barb, often called the moss green tiger barb, can vary considerably in how green it looks; to some people, it looks nearly black. Albino barbs are a light yellow with four barely visible stripes.

== Habitat ==
Tiger barbs have been reported to be found in clear or turbid shallow waters of moderately flowing streams. They live in Indonesia, Borneo, tropical climates and prefer water with a 6.0–7.5 pH, a water hardness of 5–19 dGH, and a temperature range of 77 – 82 °F or 25 – 27.8 °C. Their discovery in swamp lakes subject to great changes in water level suggests a wide tolerance to water quality fluctuations. Their average lifespan is 7 years. When exposed to decreased temperature levels, the Tiger barb fish experiences a change in body color. The male fish tend to display a bright red color in the dorsal fin, ventral fin, caudal fin, and snout. When the water temperature drops to 21 °C, both the male and the female fish were observed to have a decayed body color. When the temperature decreases even further to 19 °C, their distinct stripes even appear to be dimmed.

== Commercial importance ==
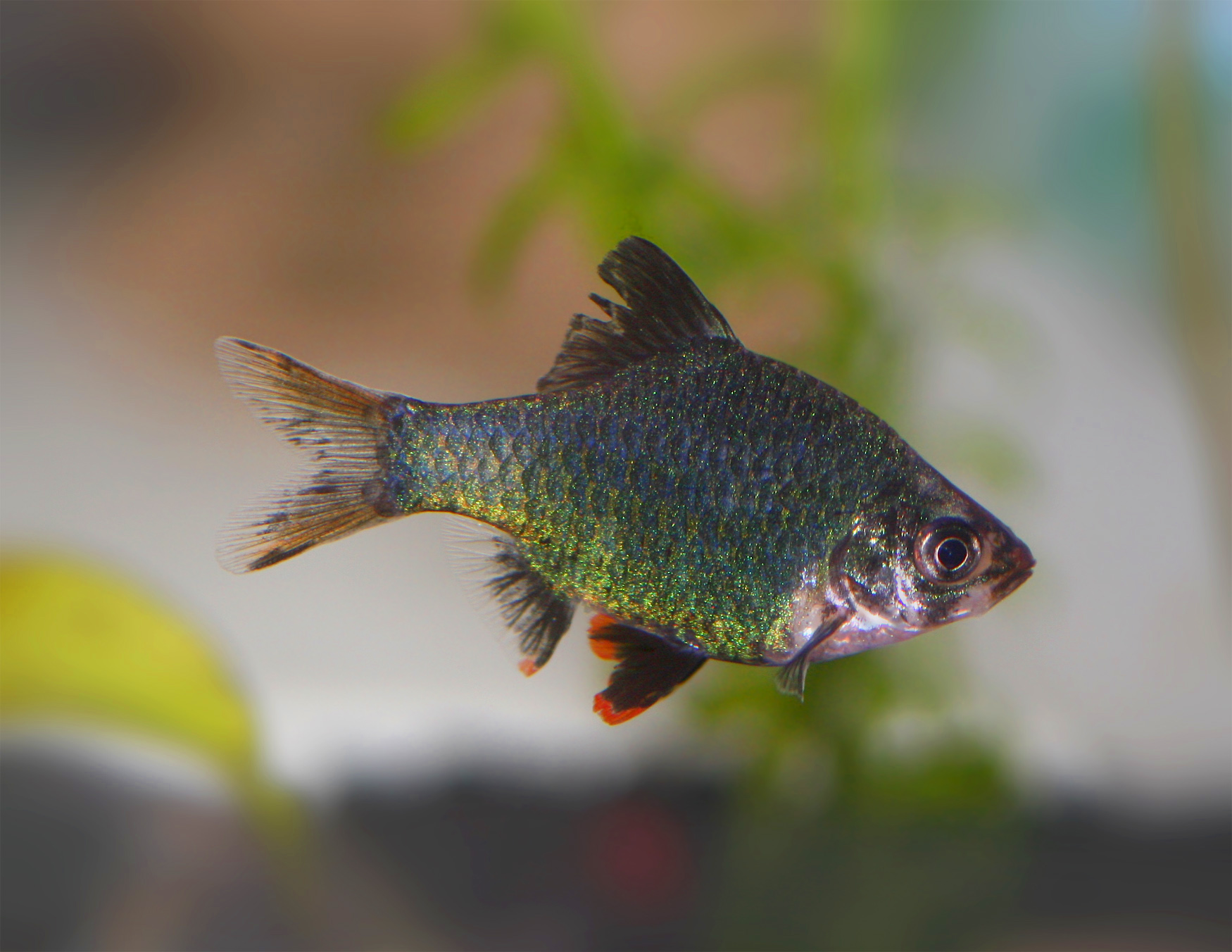
Green tiger barb

The tiger barb is one of over 70 species of barb with commercial importance in the aquarium trade. Of the total ornamental fish species imported into the United States in 1992, only 20 species account for more than 60% of the total number of specimens reported, with tiger barbs falling at tenth on the list, with 2.6 million individuals imported. (Chapman et al. 1994). Barbs that have been selectively bred to emphasize bright color combinations have grown in popularity and production over the last 20 years. Examples of colour morphs (not hybrids) of tiger barb include highly melanistic green tiger barbs that reflect green over their black because of the Tyndall effect, gold tiger barbs and albino tiger barbs.

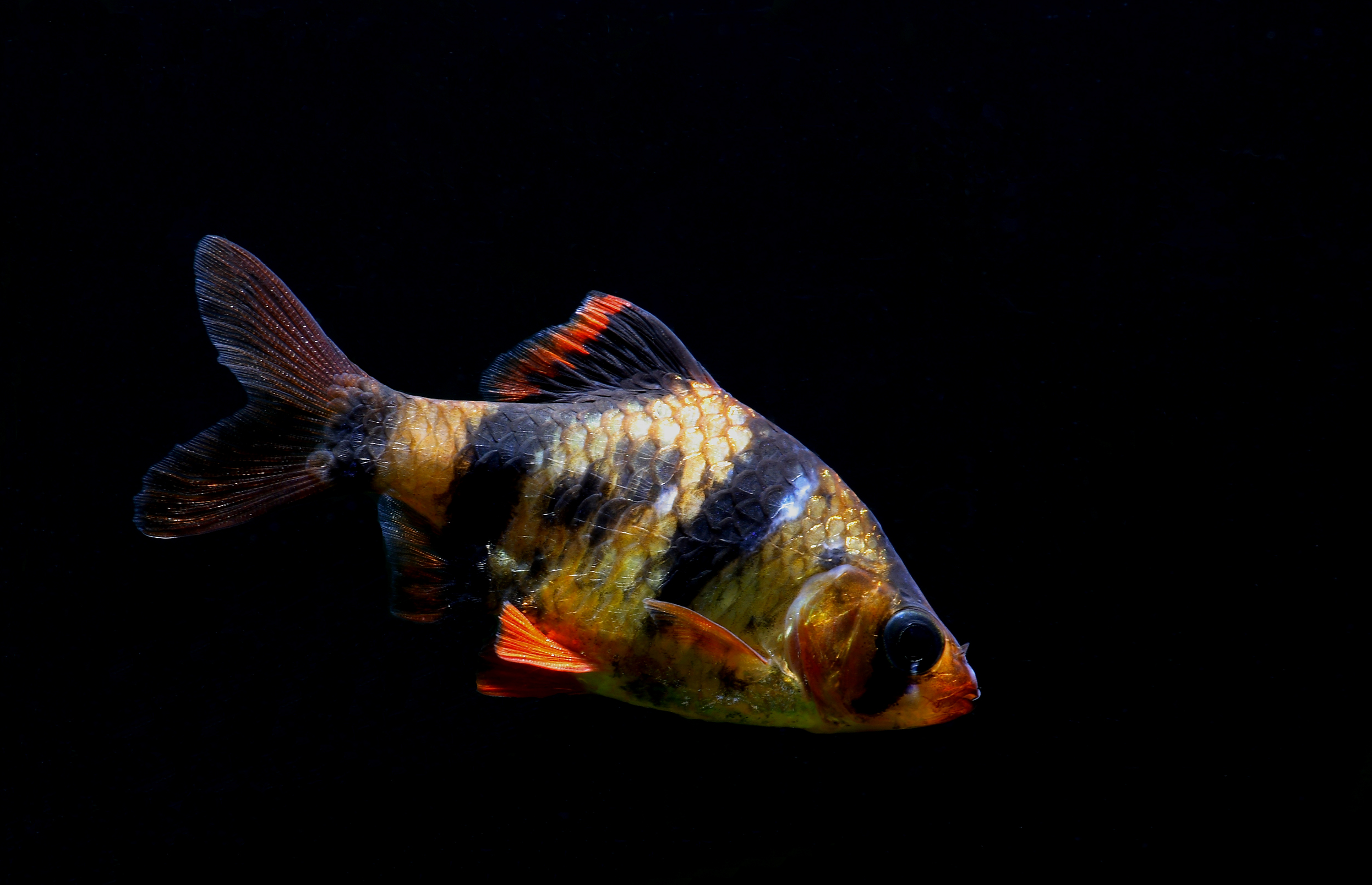
Male tiger barb

== In the aquarium ==
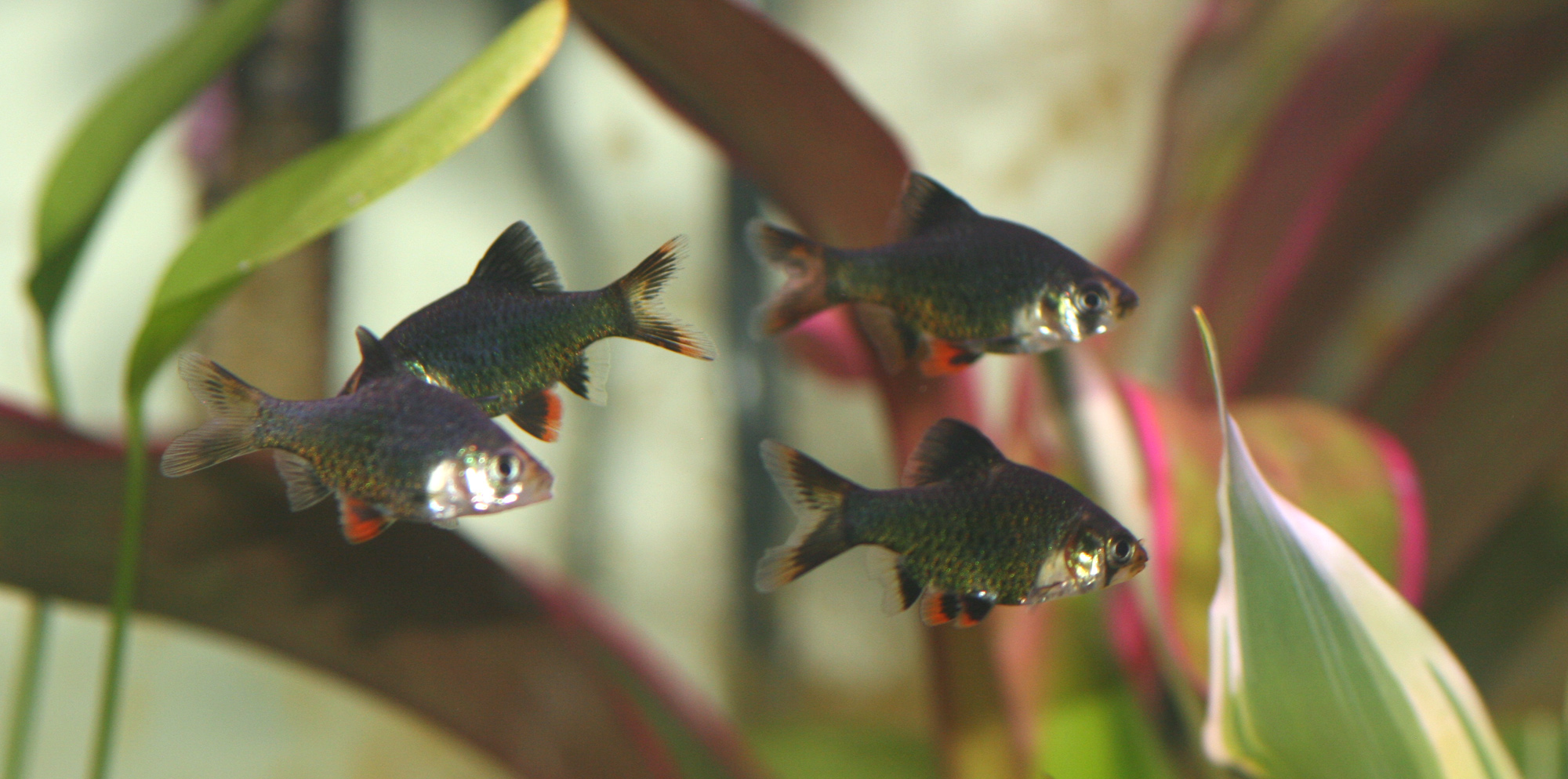
A school of green tiger barbs in a 20-gallon tank.

The tiger barb, an active shoaling fish, is usually kept in groups of six or more. They are often aggressive in numbers less than five, and are known fin nippers. Semi aggressive fish form a pecking order in the pack which they may extend to other fish, giving them a reputation for nipping at the fins of other fish, especially if they are wounded or injured. They are thus not recommended for tanks with slower, more peaceful fishes such as bettas, gouramis, angelfish and others with long, flowing fins. They do, however, work well with many fast-moving fish such as danios, platys and most catfish. When in large enough groups, however, they tend to spend most of their time chasing each other and leave other species of fish alone. They dwell primarily at the water's mid-level. One of the best tankmates for the tiger barb provided there is considerable space is the clown loach, which will school with the tiger barbs and act as they do, and the tigers act as the loaches do. Tiger barbs do best in soft, slightly acidic water. The tank should be well lit with ample vegetation, about two-thirds of the tank space. These barbs are omnivorous, and will consume processed foods such as flakes and crisps, as well as live foods. They are relatively greedy with their food consumption and can become aggressive during feeding time. Tiger barbs seem more susceptible than other species to cottonmouth (columnaris), a bacterial infection.

== Breeding ==
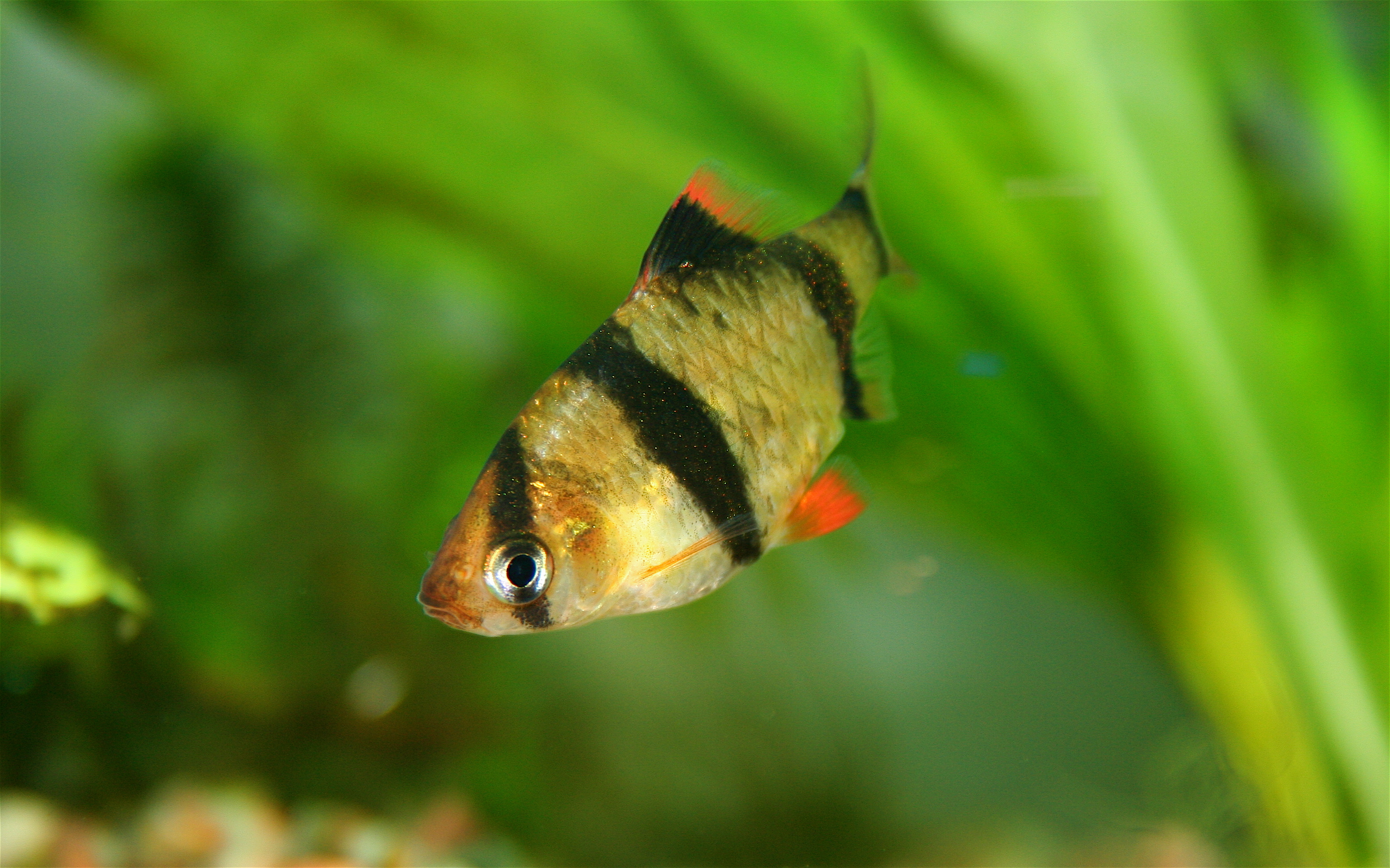
A P. tetrazona close to sexual maturity

The tiger barb usually attains sexual maturity at a body length of 2 to 3 centimeters (0.79 to 1.18 inches) in total length, or at approximately six to seven weeks of age. The females are larger with a rounder belly and a mainly black dorsal fin, while the males have a bright, red nose with a distinct red line above the black on their dorsal fins. The egg-layers tend to spawn several hundred eggs in the early morning in clumps of plants. On average, 300 eggs can be expected from each spawn in a mature broodstock population, although the number of eggs released will increase with the maturity and size of the fish. Spawned eggs are adhesive, negatively buoyant in freshwater and average 1.18 ± 0.05 mm in diameter.

Tiger barbs have been documented to spawn as many as 500 eggs per female (Scheurmann 1990; Axelrod 1992). Females can spawn at approximately two week intervals (Munro et al. 1990).

Once spawning is finished, they will usually eat any of the eggs they can find.

== Common varieties ==
Interspecific and intraspecific hybridization is done to achieve different colors and patterns to satisfy market demand for new tiger barb varieties. Gold and albino tiger barbs are examples of commercially produced fish based on recessive xanthic (yellow) and albino genes. These are not hybrids. GloFish, the brand of genetically modified fluorescent fish, sell tiger barbs in various fluorescent colors.

== See also ==
- List of freshwater aquarium fish species
