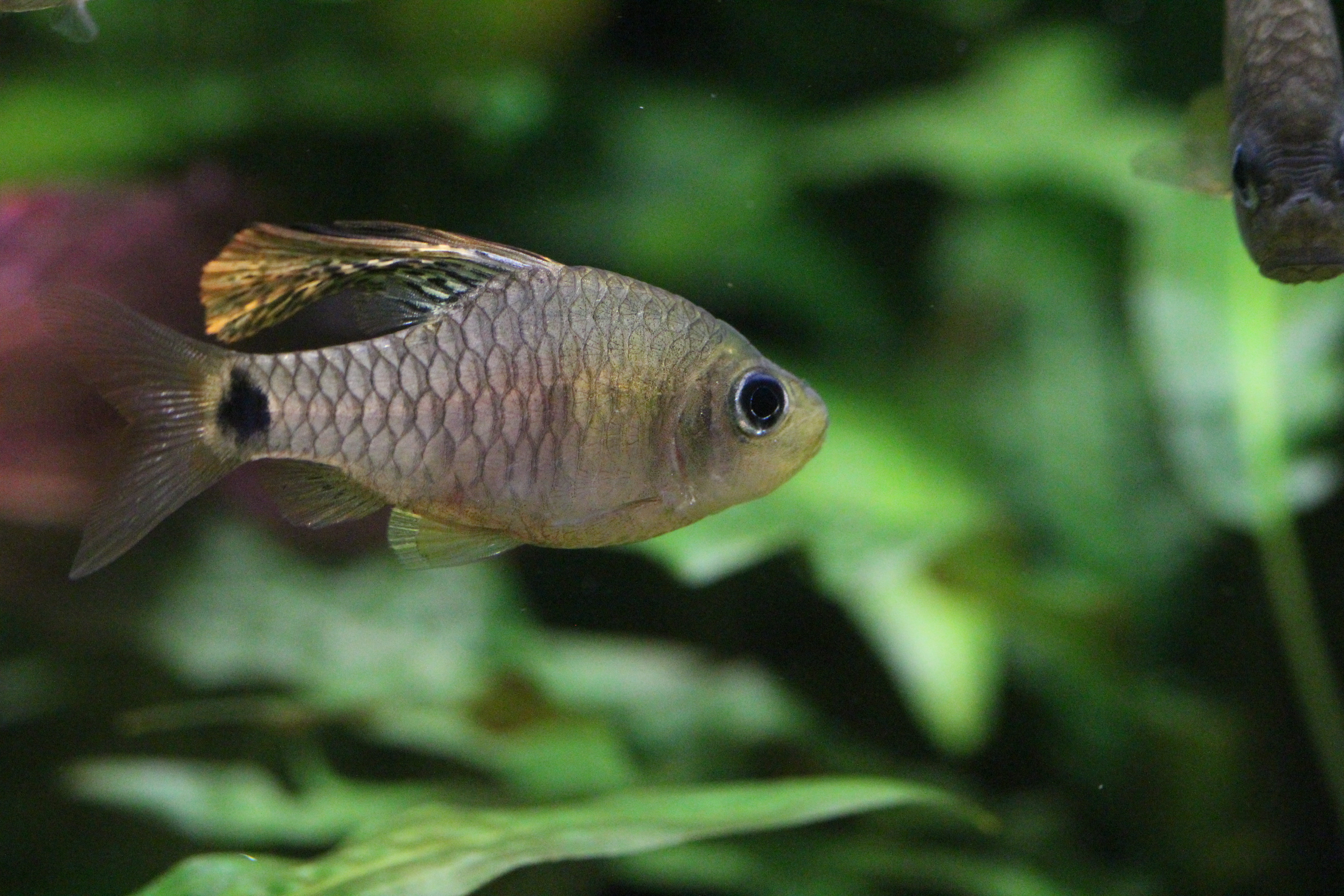

Conservation status
- Data Deficient (IUCN 3.1)

Scientific classification
- Kingdom: Animalia
- Phylum: Chordata
- Class: Actinopterygii
- Order: Cypriniformes
- Family: Cyprinidae
- Subfamily: Smiliogastrinae
- Genus: Oreichthys
- Species: O. crenuchoides

Binomial name
- Oreichthys crenuchoides Schäfer, 2009

= Oreichthys crenuchoides =

Species of fish

Oreichthys crenuchoides is a small (~2.5" TL) cyprinid found in Assam, India. It is imported for the aquarium trade under the name neon highfin barb or high-fin variable barb. It is an atypical Oreichthys in that the face is more rounded than in O. cosuatis and other Oreichthys species.

They are strictly freshwater, and are found in ditches, ponds and streams.

== Taxonomic Issues ==
The name Oreichthys umangii under which it was known in the aquarium trade, is not an available scientific name under the International Code of Zoological Nomenclature, and must not be used as such. The name was introduced in an aquarium book (Tekriwal et al., 1995), but without accompanying description, and was intended to honor Umang Tekriwal (1975-11-14 to 1996-04-19), son of Ornamental Aquarium Fishes of India co-author Kishori Tekriwal.
