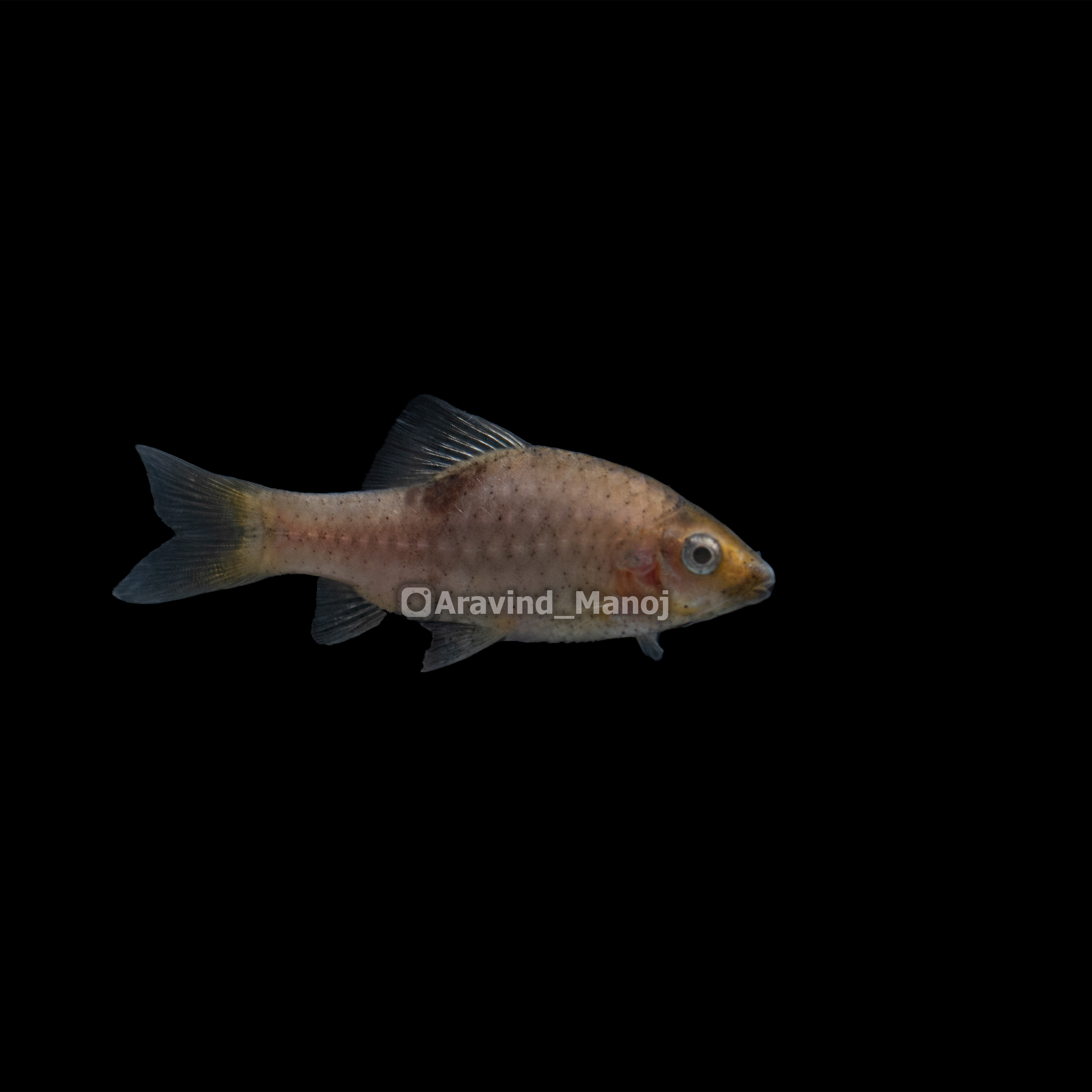

Conservation status
- Least Concern (IUCN 3.1)

Scientific classification
- Kingdom: Animalia
- Phylum: Chordata
- Class: Actinopterygii
- Order: Cypriniformes
- Family: Cyprinidae
- Subfamily: Smiliogastrinae
- Genus: Haludaria
- Species: H. kannikattiensis

Binomial name
- Haludaria kannikattiensis (Arunachalam & J. A. Johnson, 2003)

Synonyms
- Puntius kannikattiensis Arunachalam & Johnson, 2003; Dravidia kannikattiensis (Arunachalam & Johnson, 2003)

= Haludaria kannikattiensis =

Species of fish

Haludaria kannikattiensis is a species of cyprinid fish endemic to India where it is only known from hill streams in the southern Western Ghats.
