= Clypeobarbus pseudognathodon =

Conservation status
- Near Threatened (IUCN 3.1)

Scientific classification
- Kingdom: Animalia
- Phylum: Chordata
- Class: Actinopterygii
- Order: Cypriniformes
- Family: Cyprinidae
- Subfamily: Smiliogastrinae
- Genus: Clypeobarbus
- Species: C. pseudognathodon

Binomial name
- Clypeobarbus pseudognathodon (Boulenger, 1915)

Synonyms
- Barbus pseudognathodon Boulenger, 1915

Species of fish

Clypeobarbus pseudognathodon is a species of ray-finned fish in the genus Clypeobarbus from central Africa where it is known from Lake Mweru, the Lobo River and the upper Lualaba River. Its max size is 5.5 centimeters.
