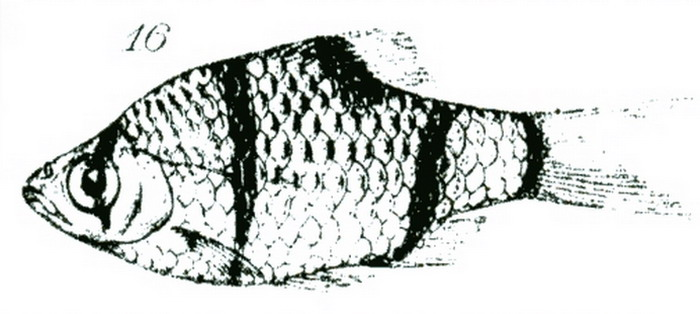

Conservation status
- Least Concern (IUCN 3.1)

Scientific classification
- Kingdom: Animalia
- Phylum: Chordata
- Class: Actinopterygii
- Order: Cypriniformes
- Family: Cyprinidae
- Subfamily: Smiliogastrinae
- Genus: Puntigrus
- Species: P. partipentazona

Binomial name
- Puntigrus partipentazona (Fowler, 1934)

Synonyms
- Barbus partipentazona Fowler, 1934; Barbus tetrazona partipentazona Fowler, 1934; Puntius partipentazona (Fowler, 1934); Systomus partipentazona (Fowler, 1934)

= Puntigrus partipentazona =

Species of fish

Puntigrus partipentazona, the Dwarf Tiger Barb, is a species of cyprinid fish native to Southeast Asia where it is found in the Mekong, Mae Klong, and Chao Phraya basins of Thailand, the Malay Peninsula, and coastal streams of southeast Thailand and Cambodia where it occurs in streams and impoundments with dense weed growth. It can also be found in the aquarium trade. It is frequently misidentified as the similar Puntigrus tetrazona.

This species can reach a length of 4 centimetres (1.6 in) SL. The fish is silver to brownish yellow with three broad black vertical stripes on the body, a fourth across the eye, and a black blotch at the base of the dorsal fin, which also has a streak of red. This streak of red is brighter in males than females, which, along with body shape and the slightly larger size of females, are the primary outward indications of sex. As is the case with all five species in the genus, the fish appears to be very similar to the widely seen commercially produced tiger barb. However, when compared side-to-side, it can be seen that on P. tetrazona, the middle body stripe extends completely through the dorsal fin. On P. partipentazona, the black coloration on the dorsal fin connects only to the black blotch on the body.

Puntigrus partipentazona is an open water, substrate egg-scatterer, and adults do not guard the eggs. It spawns in dense plant growth, and its eggs are sticky. Its specific epithet, partipentazona, means "partly five-zoned".

== See also ==
- List of freshwater aquarium fish species
