= Oreichthys andrewi =

Scientific classification
- Domain: Eukaryota
- Kingdom: Animalia
- Phylum: Chordata
- Class: Actinopterygii
- Order: Cypriniformes
- Family: Cyprinidae
- Subfamily: Smiliogastrinae
- Genus: Oreichthys
- Species: O. andrewi

Binomial name
- Oreichthys andrewi Knight, 2014

Species of fish

Oreichthys andrewi is a small cyprinid fish endemic to the Dibru River in Assam.
