= Haludaria pradhani =

Conservation status
- Endangered (IUCN 3.1)

Scientific classification
- Kingdom: Animalia
- Phylum: Chordata
- Class: Actinopterygii
- Division: Teleostei
- Order: Cypriniformes
- Family: Cyprinidae
- Subfamily: Smiliogastrinae
- Genus: Haludaria
- Species: H. pradhani

Binomial name
- Haludaria pradhani (Tilak, 1973)

Synonyms
- Puntius melanampyx pradhani Tilak, 1973

Species of fish

Haludaria pradhani is a species of cyprinid fish endemic to Goa, India. It was described by R. Tilak in 1973 as a subspecies, Puntius melanampyx pradhani, from a stream at Molem. It was subsequently treated as a synonym or a subspecies of Puntius fasciatus, and as a synonym of Puntius melanampyx, before being recognised as a species of the genus Haludaria.

== Conservation status ==
Haludaria pradhani was assessed for the IUCN Red List on 28 March 2021, in an assessment published in 2023, as Endangered under criterion B1ab(iii). It is known from three locations in inland wetlands, and its population trend is unknown. Threats to the species include housing and urban development, mining and quarrying, logging, recreational activities, and pollution from domestic, industrial and agricultural sources; it occurs in at least one protected area.
