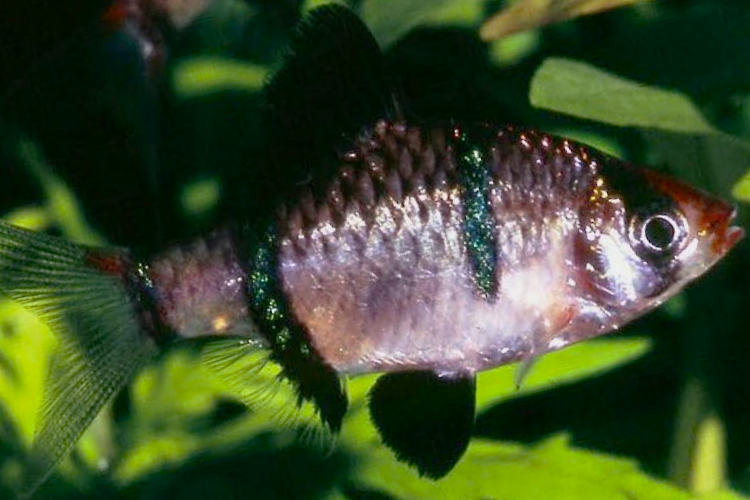

Conservation status
- Least Concern (IUCN 3.1)

Scientific classification
- Kingdom: Animalia
- Phylum: Chordata
- Class: Actinopterygii
- Division: Teleostei
- Order: Cypriniformes
- Family: Cyprinidae
- Subfamily: Smiliogastrinae
- Genus: Puntigrus
- Species: P. pulcher

Binomial name
- Puntigrus pulcher (Rendahl, 1922)

Synonyms
- Puntius pulcher Rendahl, 1922; Systomus pulcher (Rendahl, 1922)

= Puntigrus pulcher =

Species of fish

Puntigrus pulcher is a species of cyprinid fish endemic to Borneo. This species can grow to a length of 2.7 centimetres (1.1 in) TL.
