= Gorgeous barb =

Conservation status
- Data Deficient (IUCN 3.1)

Scientific classification
- Domain: Eukaryota
- Kingdom: Animalia
- Phylum: Chordata
- Class: Actinopterygii
- Order: Cypriniformes
- Family: Cyprinidae
- Subfamily: Smiliogastrinae
- Genus: Clypeobarbus
- Species: C. bellcrossi

Binomial name
- Clypeobarbus bellcrossi (R. A. Jubb, 1965)

Synonyms
- Barbus bellcrossi R. A. Jubb, 1965

Species of fish

Clypeobarbus bellcrossi, the gorgeous barb, is a species of cyprinid fish native to Africa where it is found in the headwaters of the upper Zambezi River system. This species can reach a length of 9 centimetres (3.5 in) TL. It can also be found in the aquarium trade.
