= Clypeobarbus pleuropholis =

Conservation status
- Least Concern (IUCN 3.1)

Scientific classification
- Kingdom: Animalia
- Phylum: Chordata
- Class: Actinopterygii
- Order: Cypriniformes
- Family: Cyprinidae
- Subfamily: Smiliogastrinae
- Genus: Clypeobarbus
- Species: C. pleuropholis

Binomial name
- Clypeobarbus pleuropholis (Boulenger, 1899)

Synonyms
- Barbus pleuropholis Boulenger, 1899; Barbus uellensis Boulenger, 1919; Barbus gribinguensis Pellegrin, 1919; Barbus kemoensis Fowler, 1936

Species of fish

Clypeobarbus pleuropholis is a species of ray-finned fish belonging to the family Cyprinidae, the family which includes the carps, barbs and related fishes. This species is found in the Chad Basin in Chad and Cameroon, as well as the Congo Basin in Democratic Republic of Congo, the Republic of Congo and the Central African Republic. This species, as Barbus kemoensis, is the type species of the genus Clypeobarbus.
