= Clypeobarbus breviclipeus =

Scientific classification
- Kingdom: Animalia
- Phylum: Chordata
- Class: Actinopterygii
- Order: Cypriniformes
- Family: Cyprinidae
- Subfamily: Smiliogastrinae
- Genus: Clypeobarbus
- Species: C. breviclipeus

Binomial name
- Clypeobarbus breviclipeus Stiassny & Sakharova, 2016

Species of fish

Clypeobarbus breviclipeus is a species of ray-finned fish in the genus Clypeobarbus. It is endemic to the Kwilu River in the Democratic Republic of Congo.
