= Clypeobarbus hypsolepis =

Conservation status
- Least Concern (IUCN 3.1)

Scientific classification
- Kingdom: Animalia
- Phylum: Chordata
- Class: Actinopterygii
- Division: Teleostei
- Order: Cypriniformes
- Family: Cyprinidae
- Subfamily: Smiliogastrinae
- Genus: Clypeobarbus
- Species: C. hypsolepis

Binomial name
- Clypeobarbus hypsolepis (Daget, 1959)

Synonyms
- Barbus hypsolepsis Daget, 1959

Species of fish

Clypeobarbus hypsolepis

Clypeobarbus hypsolepis a species of ray-finned fish belonging to the family Cyprinidae, the family which includes the carps, barbs and related fishes. This species is found in West Africa where it is known from the Niger River and the upper basins of the Volta, Bandama and Agnéby River in Burkina Faso, Mali, Guinea, Ghana, Ivory Coast and Nigeria, with a disjunct population in the Niger Delta.
