= Clypeobarbus schoutedeni =

Conservation status
- Data Deficient (IUCN 3.1)

Scientific classification
- Kingdom: Animalia
- Phylum: Chordata
- Class: Actinopterygii
- Order: Cypriniformes
- Family: Cyprinidae
- Subfamily: Smiliogastrinae
- Genus: Clypeobarbus
- Species: C. schoutedeni

Binomial name
- Clypeobarbus schoutedeni (Poll & J. G. Lambert, 1961)

Synonyms
- Barbus schoutedeni Poll & J. G. Lambert, 1961

Species of fish

Clypeobarbus schoutedeni is a species of cyprinid fish endemic to the Democratic Republic of the Congo where it is only known from the Dungu River. This species can reach a length of 3.8 centimetres (1.5 in) TL.
