= Clypeobarbus bomokandi =

Conservation status
- Data Deficient (IUCN 3.1)

Scientific classification
- Kingdom: Animalia
- Phylum: Chordata
- Class: Actinopterygii
- Order: Cypriniformes
- Family: Cyprinidae
- Subfamily: Smiliogastrinae
- Genus: Clypeobarbus
- Species: C. bomokandi

Binomial name
- Clypeobarbus bomokandi (G. S. Myers, 1924)

Synonyms
- Barbus bomokandi Myers, 1924; Barbus rubripinnis Nichols & Griscom, 1917

Species of fish

Clypeobarbus bomokandi is a species of ray-finned fish in the genus Clypeobarbus from the Congo Basin.
