= Haludaria afasciata =

Conservation status
- Endangered (IUCN 3.1)

Scientific classification
- Kingdom: Animalia
- Phylum: Chordata
- Class: Actinopterygii
- Division: Teleostei
- Order: Cypriniformes
- Family: Cyprinidae
- Subfamily: Smiliogastrinae
- Genus: Haludaria
- Species: H. afasciata

Binomial name
- Haludaria afasciata (Jayaram, 1990)

Synonyms
- Puntius afasciatus Jayaram, 1990; Dravidia afasciata (Jayaram, 1990)

Species of fish

Haludaria afasciata, the plain melon barb, is a species of freshwater ray-finned fish belonging to the family Cyprinidae, the family which includes the carps, barbs and related fishes. This species is endemic to India where it is known only from one locality near the city of Nagercoil in the southern Tamil Nadu. The International Union for the Conservation of Nature classifies this species as Endangered, being threatened by sand extraction, deforestation, pollution from agricultural runoff and factories, as well as the invasives, Mozambique tilapia (Oreochromis mossambicus) and the weed Pontederia crassipes.
