= Congo barb =

Conservation status
- Least Concern (IUCN 3.1)

Scientific classification
- Kingdom: Animalia
- Phylum: Chordata
- Class: Actinopterygii
- Order: Cypriniformes
- Family: Cyprinidae
- Subfamily: Smiliogastrinae
- Genus: Clypeobarbus
- Species: C. congicus

Binomial name
- Clypeobarbus congicus (Boulenger, 1899)

Synonyms
- Barbus congicus Boulenger, 1899

Species of fish

The Congo barb (Clypeobarbus congicus) is a species of ray-finned fish belonging to the family Cyprinidae, the family which includes the carps, barbs and related fishes. This species is found in the basin of the Congo River in the Democratic Republic of Congo; and in the Ruzizi River in Burundi and the Malagarasi River in western Tanzania in East Africa.
