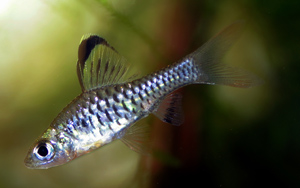

Conservation status
- Data Deficient (IUCN 3.1)

Scientific classification
- Kingdom: Animalia
- Phylum: Chordata
- Class: Actinopterygii
- Order: Cypriniformes
- Family: Cyprinidae
- Subfamily: Smiliogastrinae
- Genus: Oreichthys
- Species: O. parvus

Binomial name
- Oreichthys parvus H. M. Smith, 1933

= Oreichthys parvus =

Species of fish

Oreichthys parvus is a small cyprinid fish found in southeastern Thailand, northern Malay Peninsula and Mekong basin in Laos and Thailand.

== Description ==
O. parvus has numerous conspicuous rows of pores on the head, an incomplete lateral line perforating about 6 scales, a dark crescent-shaped mark at the base of each scale, a dark blotch at the base of the caudal fin, one at the tip of the dorsal fin and one along the anterior margin of the anal fin.
