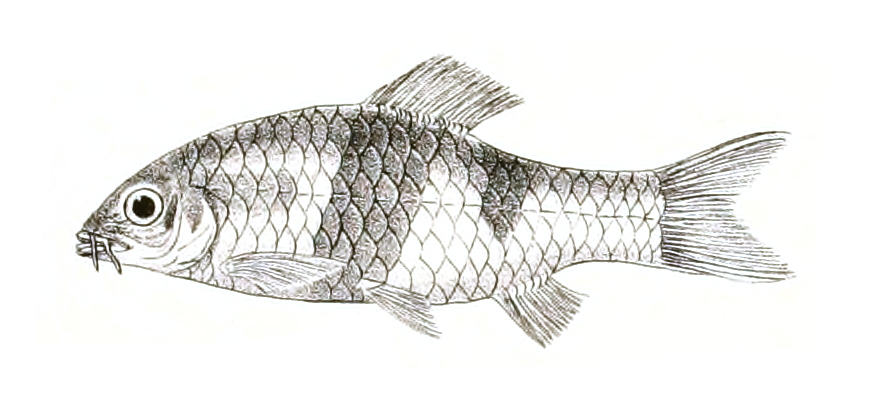

Conservation status
- Data Deficient (IUCN 3.1)

Scientific classification
- Kingdom: Animalia
- Phylum: Chordata
- Class: Actinopterygii
- Order: Cypriniformes
- Family: Cyprinidae
- Subfamily: Smiliogastrinae
- Genus: Haludaria
- Species: H. melanampyx

Binomial name
- Haludaria melanampyx (F. Day, 1865)

Synonyms
- Puntius melanampyx (Day, 1865); Labeo melanampyx Day, 1865; Dravidia melanampys (Day, 1865)

= Haludaria melanampyx =

Species of fish

Haludaria melanampyx is a species of cyprinid fish endemic to India where it is known from south Kanara through the Travancore hills to the Nagercoil, Nilgiris, and Cauvery drainages in the Western Ghats, India.
