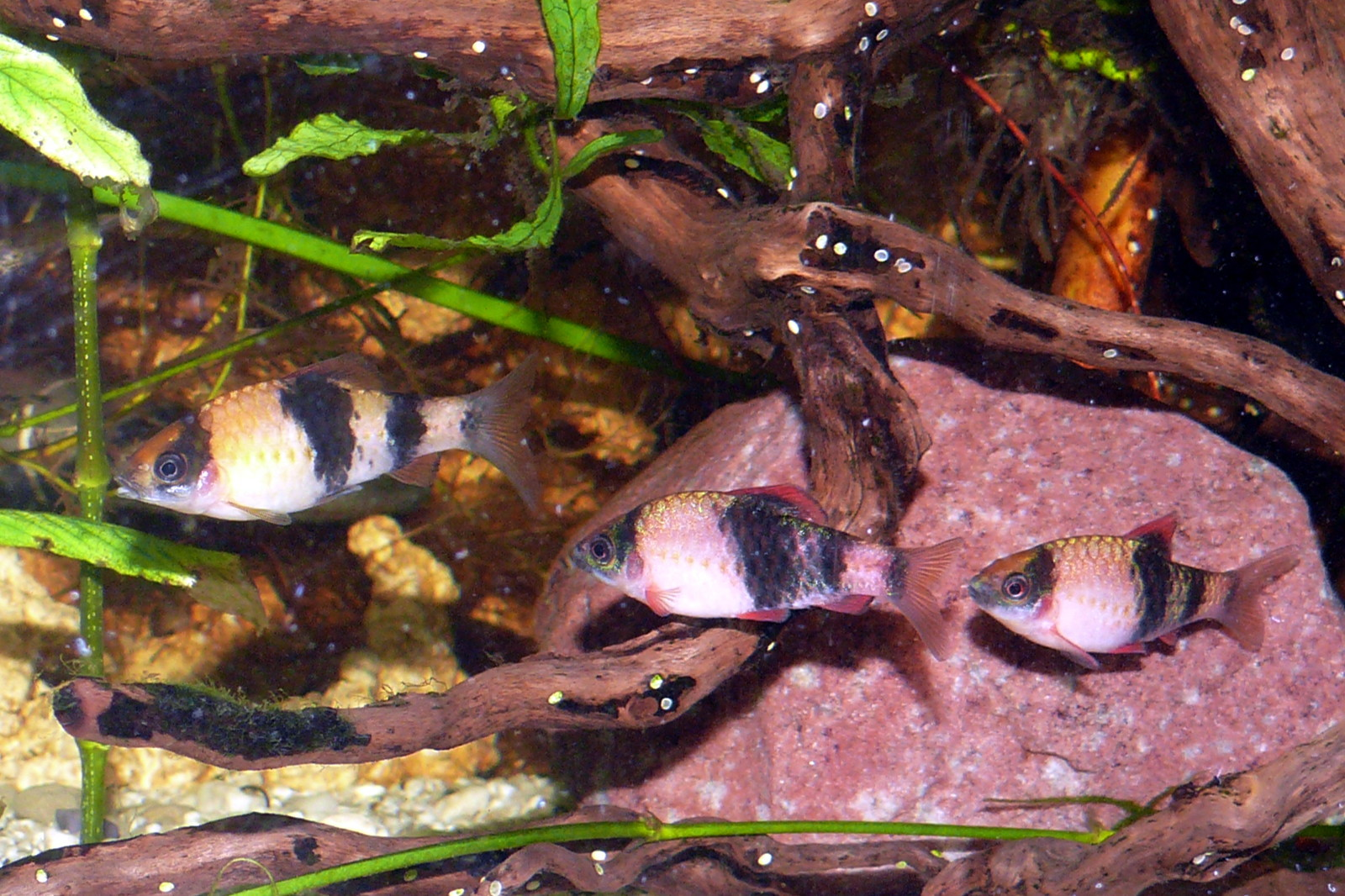

Conservation status
- Least Concern (IUCN 3.1)

Scientific classification
- Kingdom: Animalia
- Phylum: Chordata
- Class: Actinopterygii
- Order: Cypriniformes
- Family: Cyprinidae
- Subfamily: Smiliogastrinae
- Genus: Haludaria
- Species: H. fasciata

Binomial name
- Haludaria fasciata (Jerdon, 1849)

Synonyms
- Barbus fasciatus (Jerdon, 1849); Cirrhinus fasciatus Jerdon, 1849; Dravidia fasciata (Jerdon, 1849); Puntius fasciatus (Jerdon, 1849); Puntius fasciatus fasciatus (Jerdon, 1849); Puntius fasciatus pradhani Tilak, 1973; Puntius melanampyx pradhani Tilak, 1973

= Melon barb =

Species of fish

The melon barb (Haludaria fasciata) is a common species of cyprinid fish endemic to rivers of the states of Goa, Karnataka, Kerala and Tamil Nadu in the Western Ghats of South India. They live in a tropical climate, and water that they are found in typically has a pH of 6.0—6.5, a hardness of around 5 dGH, and a temperature range of 22–26 °C (72–79 °F). The melon barb can grow to a length of 6 centimetres (2.4 in), and may be found in the aquarium trade.

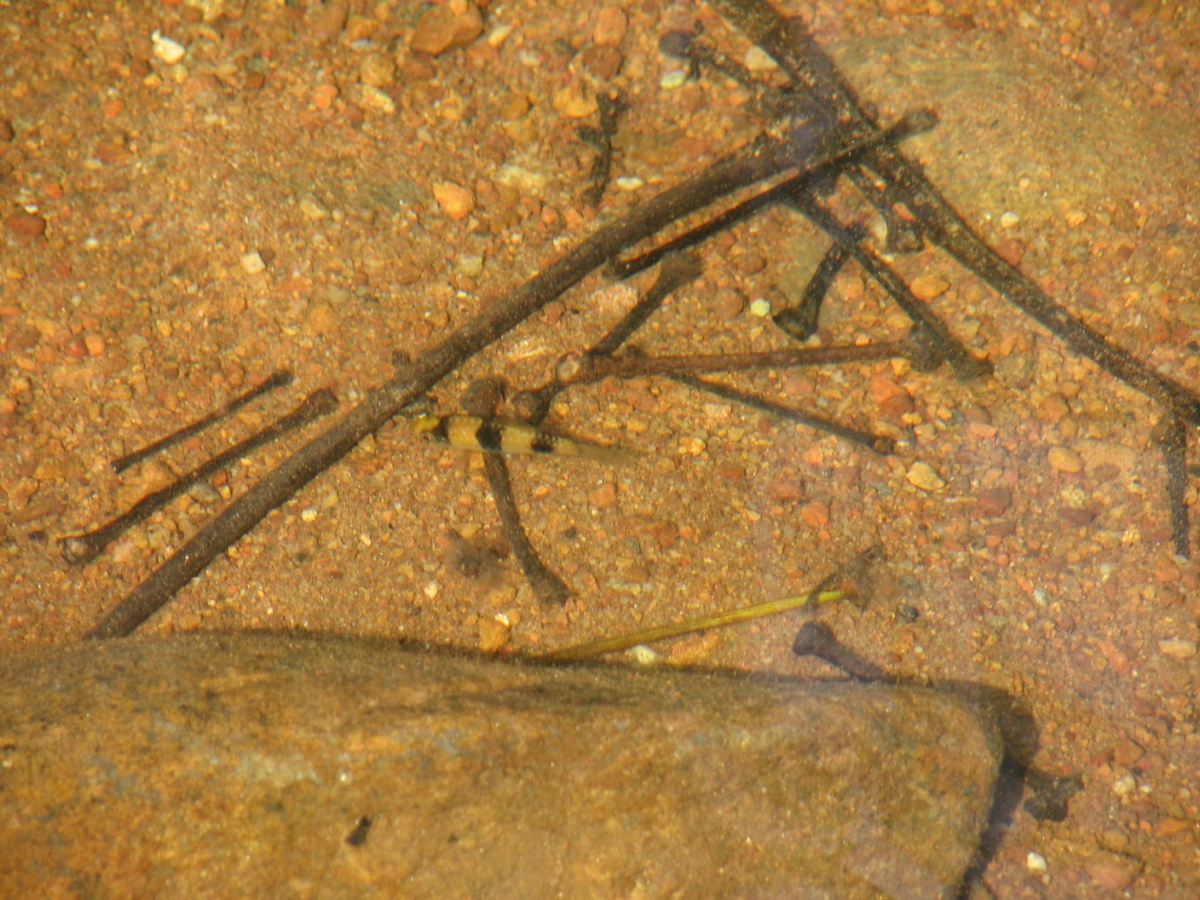
Typical spawning site

The melon barb is a substrate egg-scatterer, and adults do not guard the eggs. Males in breeding condition flush red and develop fine nuptial tubercles on their snouts, which are used for bumping and rubbing the females to induce egg release.

== See also ==
- List of freshwater aquarium fish species
