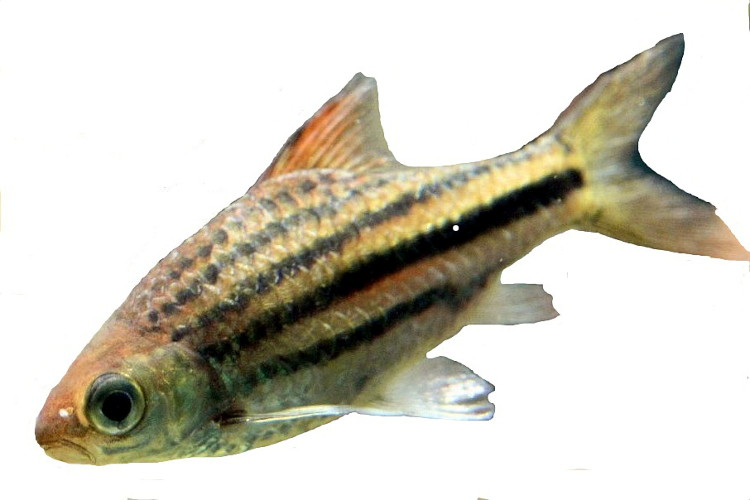

Scientific classification
- Kingdom: Animalia
- Phylum: Chordata
- Class: Actinopterygii
- Order: Cypriniformes
- Family: Cyprinidae
- Subfamily: Smiliogastrinae
- Genus: Striuntius; Kottelat, 2013
- Species: S. lineatus

Binomial name
- Striuntius lineatus (Duncker, 1904)

Synonyms
- Barbus lineatus Duncker, 1904; Puntius lineatus (Duncker, 1904)

= Lined barb =

Species of fish

The lined barb (Striuntius lineatus) is a species of cyprinid fish native to Malaysia and Indonesia where it can be found in swamps, standing waters with submerged grasses and blackwater rivers. This species can reach a length of 5.3 centimetres (2.1 in). It can also be found in the aquarium trade.

== Etymology ==
The genus name Striuntius is a combination of parts of the Latin "striatus", meaning "striated" and the genus name Puntius. The specific epithet lineatus is Latin for "lined" referring to the color pattern of this fish.
