= Oreichthys coorgensis =

Scientific classification
- Domain: Eukaryota
- Kingdom: Animalia
- Phylum: Chordata
- Class: Actinopterygii
- Order: Cypriniformes
- Family: Cyprinidae
- Subfamily: Smiliogastrinae
- Genus: Oreichthys
- Species: O. coorgensis

Binomial name
- Oreichthys coorgensis Jayaram, 1982

Synonyms
- Puntius coorgensis Jayaram, 1982

Species of fish

Oreichthys coorgensis is a small cyprinid fish found in Western Ghats, India. It is endemic to the Cauvery River in Karnataka.
