= Oreichthys incognito =

Conservation status
- Endangered (IUCN 3.1)

Scientific classification
- Kingdom: Animalia
- Phylum: Chordata
- Class: Actinopterygii
- Order: Cypriniformes
- Family: Cyprinidae
- Subfamily: Smiliogastrinae
- Genus: Oreichthys
- Species: O. incognito

Binomial name
- Oreichthys incognito Knight & R. G. Kumar, 2015

Species of fish

Oreichthys incognito is a small cyprinid fish often found in the Kunthipuzha River in Kerala.
