= Clypeobarbus matthesi =

Conservation status
- Least Concern (IUCN 3.1)

Scientific classification
- Kingdom: Animalia
- Phylum: Chordata
- Class: Actinopterygii
- Order: Cypriniformes
- Family: Cyprinidae
- Subfamily: Smiliogastrinae
- Genus: Clypeobarbus
- Species: C. matthesi

Binomial name
- Clypeobarbus matthesi (Poll & J. P. Gosse, 1963)

Synonyms
- Barbus matthesi Poll & Gosse, 1963; Enteromius matthesi (Poll & Gosse, 1963)

Species of fish

Clypeobarbus matthesi s a species of ray-finned fish belonging to the family Cyprinidae, the family which includes the carps, barbs and related fishes. This species is found in the basin of the Congo River.
