= Oreichthys duospilus =

Conservation status
- Least Concern (IUCN 3.1)

Scientific classification
- Kingdom: Animalia
- Phylum: Chordata
- Class: Actinopterygii
- Order: Cypriniformes
- Family: Cyprinidae
- Subfamily: Smiliogastrinae
- Genus: Oreichthys
- Species: O. duospilus

Binomial name
- Oreichthys duospilus Knight & R. G. Kumar, 2015

Species of fish

Oreichthys duospilus is a species of freshwater ray-finned fish belonging to the family Cyprinidae, the family which includes the carps, barbs and related fishes. This fish is endemic to India where it is found in the darianges of the Krishna and Sharavati rivers in the states of Maharashtra and Karnataka. This species has a maximum standard length of 3.1 cm (1.2 in).
