= Prolabeops melanhypopterus =

Conservation status
- Least Concern (IUCN 3.1)

Scientific classification
- Kingdom: Animalia
- Phylum: Chordata
- Class: Actinopterygii
- Order: Cypriniformes
- Family: Cyprinidae
- Genus: Prolabeops
- Species: P. melanhypopterus

Binomial name
- Prolabeops melanhypopterus (Pellegrin, 1928)

Synonyms
- Barbus melanhypopterus Pellegrin, 1928; Prolabeops cameroonensis Schultz, 1941

Species of fish

Prolabeops melanhypopterus is a species of freshwater ray-finned fish belonging to the family Cyprinidae, the family which includes the carps, barbs and related fishes. It inhabits Cameroon and has a maximum length of 8.5 centimetres (3.3 in). It has been assessed as "least concern" on the IUCN Red List and is considered harmless to humans.
