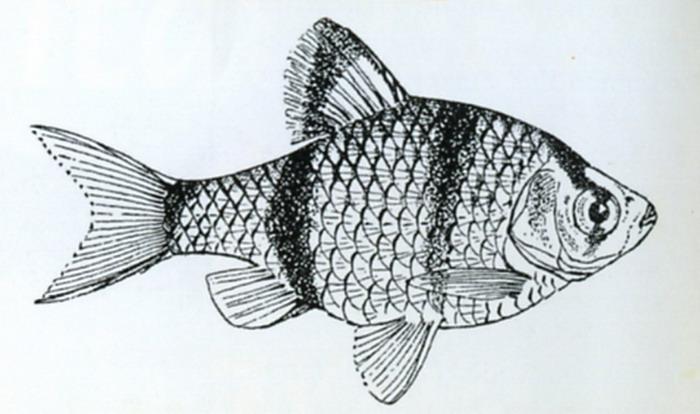

Conservation status
- Least Concern (IUCN 3.1)

Scientific classification
- Kingdom: Animalia
- Phylum: Chordata
- Class: Actinopterygii
- Order: Cypriniformes
- Family: Cyprinidae
- Subfamily: Smiliogastrinae
- Genus: Puntigrus
- Species: P. anchisporus

Binomial name
- Puntigrus anchisporus (Vaillant, 1902)

Synonyms
- Barbus anchisporus Vaillant, 1902; Puntius anchisporus (Vaillant, 1902); Systomus anchisporus (Vaillant, 1902)

= Puntigrus anchisporus =

Species of fish

Puntigrus anchisporus is a species of cyprinid fish endemic to Borneo. This species can grow to a length of 6.6 centimetres (2.6 in) TL.
