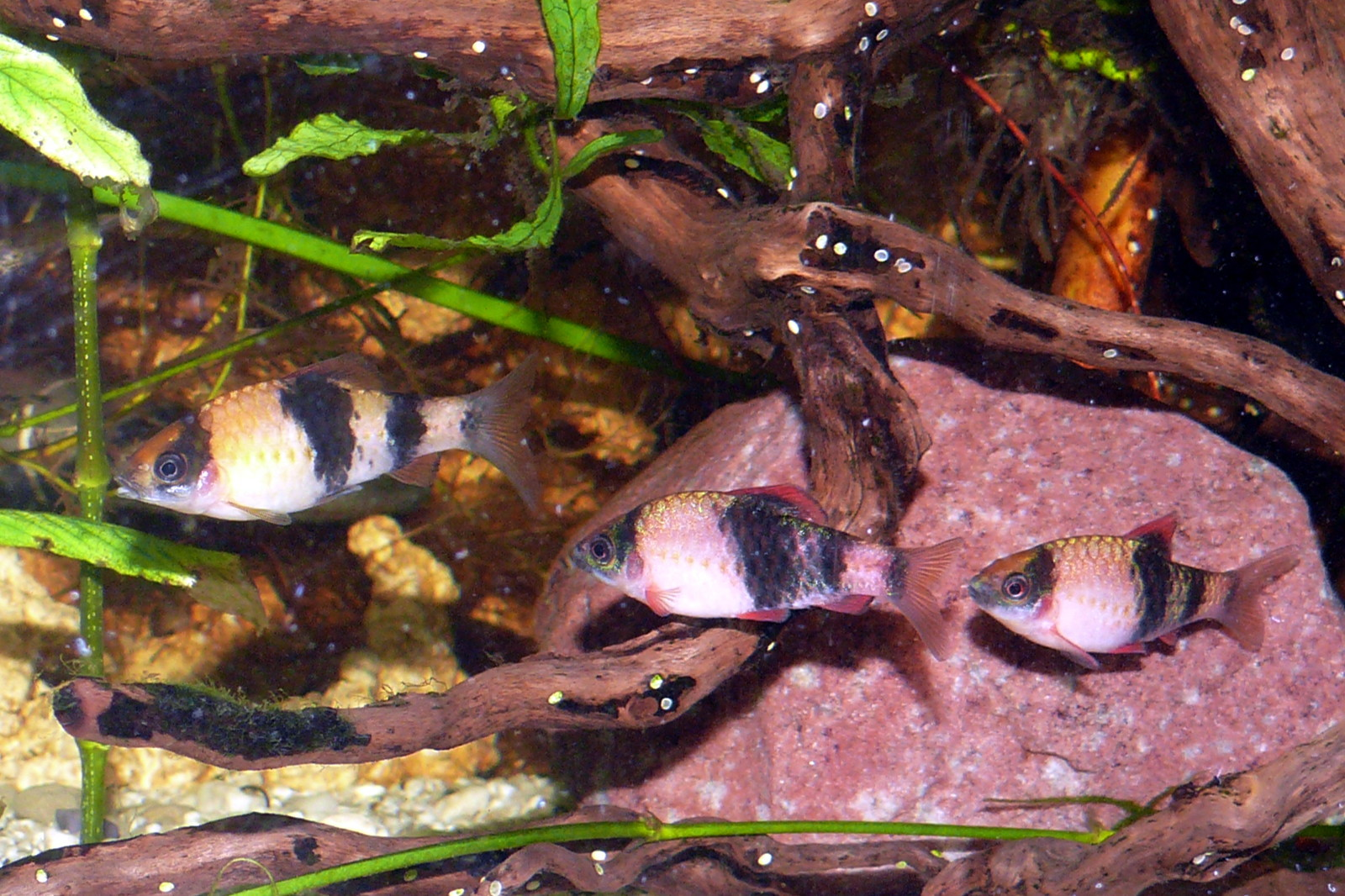
- Melon barb, Haludaria fasciata

Scientific classification
- Kingdom: Animalia
- Phylum: Chordata
- Class: Actinopterygii
- Order: Cypriniformes
- Family: Cyprinidae
- Subfamily: Smiliogastrinae
- Genus: Haludaria; Pethiyagoda, 2013

Type species
- Cirrhinus fasciatus Jerdon, 1849

Synonyms
- Dravidia Pethiyagoda, Meegaskumbura & Maduwage, 2012 (preoccupied)

= Haludaria =

Genus of fishes

Haludaria is a genus of cyprinids native to freshwater habitats in the Western Ghats of India. Originally the genus was named Dravidia Pethiyagoda, Meegaskumbura & Maduwage, 2012 which is preoccupied by the dipteran genus Dravidia Lehrer, 2010.

== Etymology ==
The name Haludaria is derived from "Haludar", the name of a Bengali youth and artist who provided the illustrations for Francis Hamilton's (Formerly Buchanan) book on the Ganges River fishes.

== Description ==
Adults are small, typically less than 6 cm (2.4 in) SL. Both rostral and maxillary barbels are present. Lateral line is complete and has 18–26 pored scales on body. There are one or two broad, black bars on flank, between bases of dorsal and anal fins.

== Species ==
There are currently five recognized species in this genus:

- Haludaria afasciata (Jayaram, 1990)
- Haludaria fasciata (Jerdon, 1849) (Melon barb)
- Haludaria kannikattiensis (Arunachalam & J. A. Johnson, 2003)
- Haludaria melanampyx (F. Day, 1865)
- Haludaria pradhani (Tilak, 1973)
