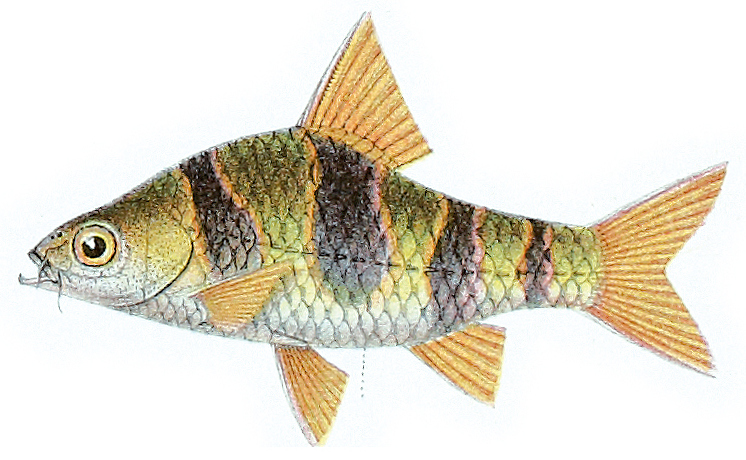
- Tiger barb, Puntigrus tetrazona

Scientific classification
- Kingdom: Animalia
- Phylum: Chordata
- Class: Actinopterygii
- Order: Cypriniformes
- Family: Cyprinidae
- Subfamily: Smiliogastrinae
- Genus: Puntigrus; Kottelat, 2013

Type species
- Barbus partipentazona Fowler, 1934

= Puntigrus =

Genus of fishes

Puntigrus is a genus of cyprinids native to Southeast Asia.

The genus was established in 2013 to contain the "Tiger Barb" species group previously all identified as Puntius tetrazona.

== "Tiger Barb" Disambiguation ==
The common name tiger barbs is sometimes applied to the genus as a whole.

Furthermore tiger barb is sometimes applied to all members of the genus, however the epithet is most commonly associated with Puntius tetrazona.

== Etymology ==
The name Puntigrus is derived from the first syllable of the cyprinid genus Puntius and "tigrus" (to allude to the Latin "tigris" meaning "tiger").

== Species ==
There are currently five recognized species in this genus:

- Puntigrus anchisporus (Vaillant, 1902)
- Puntigrus navjotsodhii (H. H. Tan, 2012)
- Puntigrus partipentazona (Fowler, 1934)
- Puntigrus pulcher (Rendahl (de), 1922)
- Puntigrus tetrazona (Bleeker, 1855) (Tiger Barb)

== Conservation status ==
As of 2020, the IUCN lists all five fish in the genus Puntigrus as species of Least concern.
