= Namaquab barb =

Conservation status
- Least Concern (IUCN 3.1)

Scientific classification
- Kingdom: Animalia
- Phylum: Chordata
- Class: Actinopterygii
- Order: Cypriniformes
- Family: Cyprinidae
- Subfamily: Smiliogastrinae
- Genus: Namaquacypris; Skelton, Swartz & Vreven, 2018
- Species: N. hospes

Binomial name
- Namaquacypris hospes (Barnard, 1938)

Synonyms
- Barbus hospes Barnard, 1938; Enteromius hospes (Barnard, 1938); Pseudobarbus hospes (Barnard, 1938)

Species of fish

The Namaquab barb (Namaquacypris hospes) is a species of cyprinid fish. It is the only species in the genus Namaquacypris.

It is found in Namibia and South Africa. River regulation in the Orange River system may have benefited this species.
