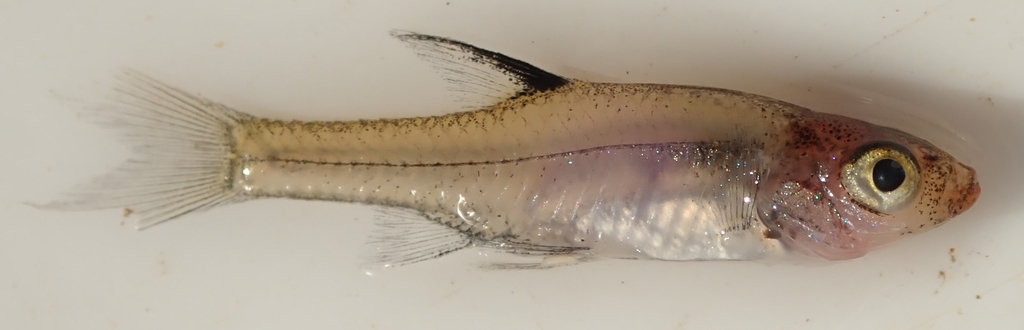
- Upjaw barb (Coptostomabarbus wittei)

Scientific classification
- Kingdom: Animalia
- Phylum: Chordata
- Class: Actinopterygii
- Order: Cypriniformes
- Family: Cyprinidae
- Subfamily: Smiliogastrinae
- Genus: Coptostomabarbus; L. R. David & Poll, 1937

Type species
- Coptostomabarbus wittei David & Poll, 1937

= Coptostomabarbus =

Genus of fishes

Coptostomabarbus is a small genus of cyprinid fish containing only two African species.

== Species ==
- Coptostomabarbus bellcrossi Poll, 1969
- Coptostomabarbus wittei L. R. David & Poll, 1937 (Upjaw barb)
