= Prolabeops =

Scientific classification
- Domain: Eukaryota
- Kingdom: Animalia
- Phylum: Chordata
- Class: Actinopterygii
- Order: Cypriniformes
- Family: Cyprinidae
- Subfamily: Smiliogastrinae
- Genus: Prolabeops; L. P. Schultz, 1941

Type species
- Prolabeops cameroonensis Schultz 1941

Genus of fishes

Prolabeops is a genus of cyprinid fish endemic to Cameroon. There are two species in this genus.

== Species ==
- Prolabeops melanhypopterus (Pellegrin, 1928)
- Prolabeops nyongensis Daget, 1984
