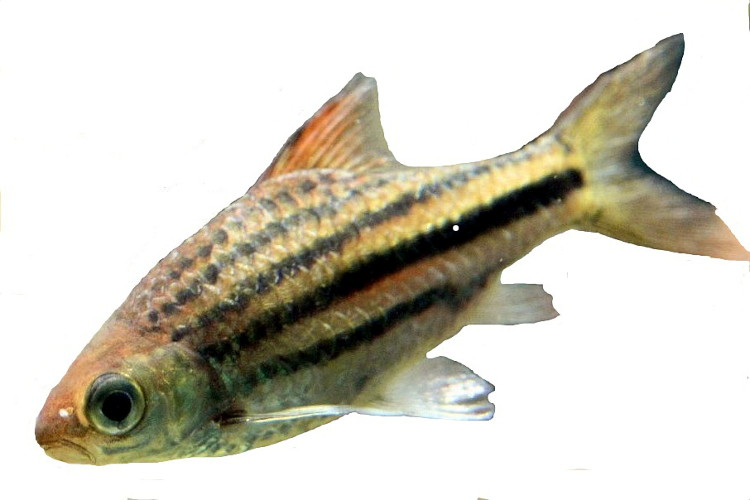
- Lined barb (Striuntius lineatus)

Scientific classification
- Kingdom: Animalia
- Phylum: Chordata
- Class: Actinopterygii
- Order: Cypriniformes
- Family: Cyprinidae
- Subfamily: Smiliogastrinae
- Genus: Striuntius; Kottelat, 2013

Type species
- Barbus lineatus Duncker, 1904

= Striuntius =

Genus of fishes

Striuntius is a genus of freshwater ray-finned fishes belonging to the family Cyprinidae, the family which includes the carps, barbs and related species. The fishes in this genus are found in Southeast Asia.

== Species ==
Striuntius has the following 2 species classified within it:

- Striuntius lateristriga (Valenciennes, 1842) (Spanner barb)
- Striuntius lineatus (Duncker, 1904) (Lined barb)
