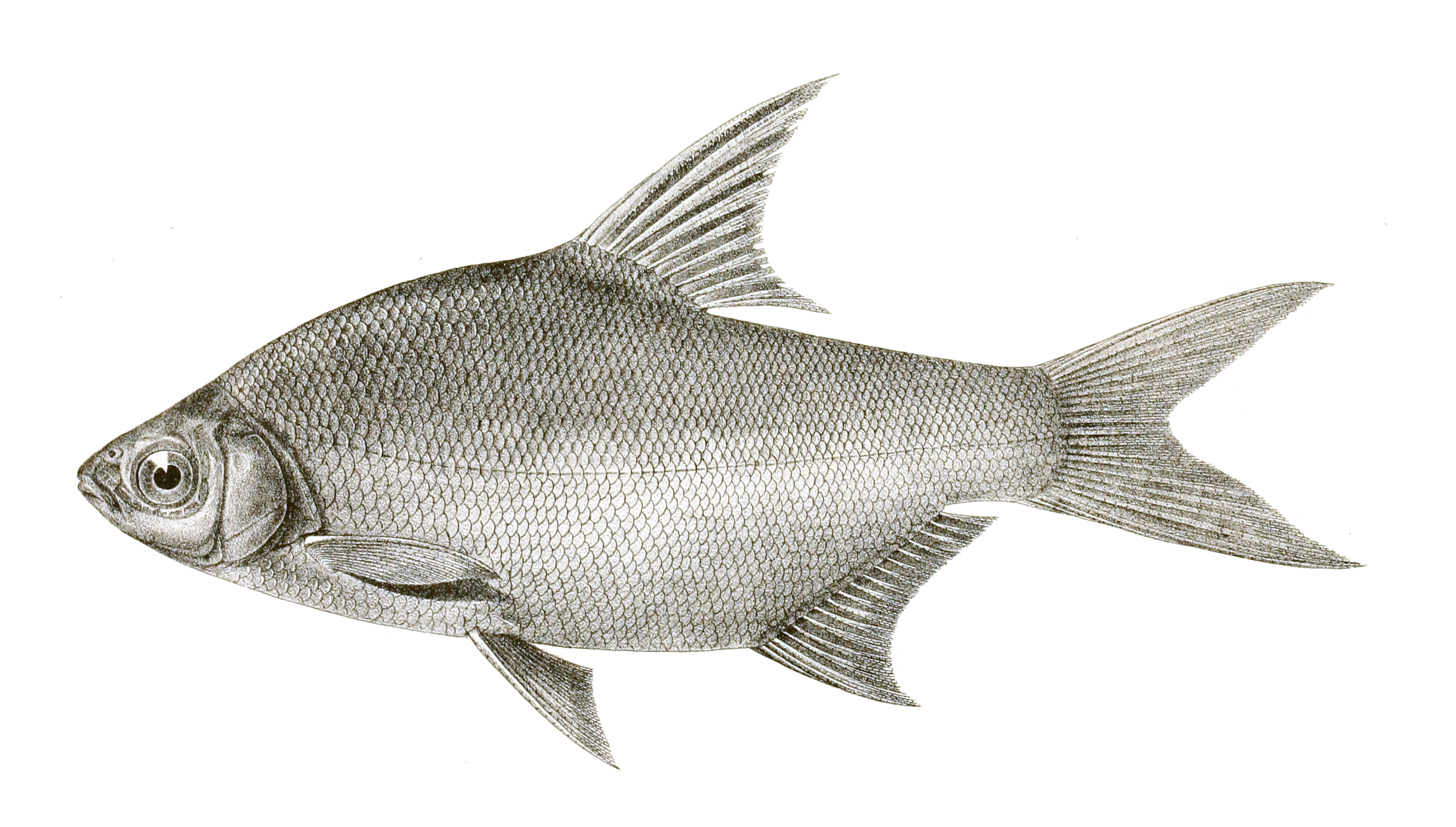

Conservation status
- Least Concern (IUCN 3.1)

Scientific classification
- Kingdom: Animalia
- Phylum: Chordata
- Class: Actinopterygii
- Order: Cypriniformes
- Family: Cyprinidae
- Subfamily: Smiliogastrinae
- Genus: Rohtee; Sykes, 1839
- Species: R. ogilbii

Binomial name
- Rohtee ogilbii Sykes, 1839

Synonyms
- Mystacoleucus ogilbii (Sykes, 1839); Osteobrama ogilbii (Sykes, 1839); Systomus ogilbii (Sykes, 1839)

= Rohtee =

Monotypic genus of fish

Rohtee is a monospecific genus of freshwater ray-fiined fish belonging to the family Cyprinidae. the family which includes the carps, barbs and related fishes. The only species in the genus is Rohtee ogilbii, the Vatani rohtee, which is endemic to the northern Western Ghats in southern India.
