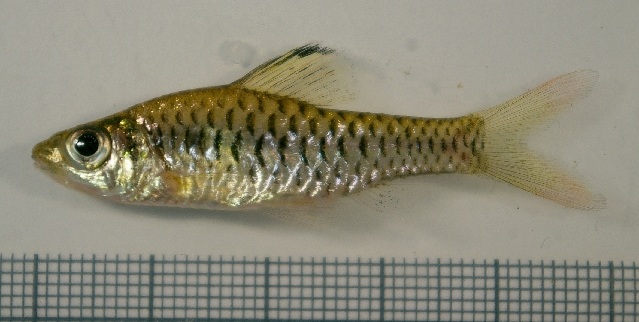
- Oreichthys cosuatis

Scientific classification
- Kingdom: Animalia
- Phylum: Chordata
- Class: Actinopterygii
- Order: Cypriniformes
- Family: Cyprinidae
- Subfamily: Smiliogastrinae
- Genus: Oreichthys; H. M. Smith, 1933

Type species
- Oreichthys parvus H. M. Smith, 1933

= Oreichthys =

Genus of fishes

Oreichthys is a genus of tropical barbs found in Thailand, India, Bangladesh, Myanmar (Burma), northern Malay Peninsula, and the Mekong basin in Laos. They are found in ditches, ponds, streams (both highland and lowland) and canals. The genus Oreichthys (Smith 1933) was originally established to receive little fish collected in a small brook on Kao Sabap, an extensive mountain range near Chantaburi, Thailand.

== Species ==
These are the currently recognized species in this genus:

- Oreichthys andrewi Knight, 2014
- Oreichthys coorgensis (Jayaram, 1982)
- Oreichthys cosuatis (Hamilton, 1822)
- Oreichthys crenuchoides Schäfer, 2009
- Oreichthys duospilus Knight & Kumar, 2015
- Oreichthys elianae
- Oreichthys incognito Knight & Kumar, 2015
- Oreichthys parvus H. M. Smith, 1933
- Oreichthys warjaintia Dann, Dahanukar & Raghavan, 2024

== Physical description ==
All Oreichthys, with the exception of O. crenuchoides, possess a triangular-looking body, with the face being pointed. In O. crenuchoides, the body and face are more rounded. The last simple dorsal ray is flexible and smooth. Scale count is 23 in the lengthwise series and 7 in the transverse series. The tube-bearing scales of the lateral line are restricted to the first 6 or 7 scales anteriorly. The head is marked by numerous fine rows of pores, mostly in parallel groups on the snout, cheeks, interorbital space, and operuclar bones. Barbels are absent.

== Distribution ==
Thailand, India, Bangladesh, Myanmar (Burma), northern Malay Peninsula, and the Mekong basin in Laos.

== Habitat ==
Oreichthys are found in ditches, ponds, streams (both highland and lowland) and canals.

== Aquarium Maintenance ==
All Oreichthys species are easily maintained in aquaria. They are generally peaceful towards conspecifics and tankmates, even where the other fish may be smaller than they are. They appear to prefer cooler water temperatures, with 76 °F appearing to be the short-term upper limit unless auxiliary aeration is provided. They will feed on flake food, micro-pellets, frozen bloodworms, frozen mysis shrimp, and gelatin diet. All in all they are not fussy feeders, and adapt readily to captivity. pH should range from neutral to slightly alkaline with moderate water hardness.
