= Prolabeops nyongensis =

Conservation status
- Data Deficient (IUCN 3.1)

Scientific classification
- Kingdom: Animalia
- Phylum: Chordata
- Class: Actinopterygii
- Order: Cypriniformes
- Family: Cyprinidae
- Genus: Prolabeops
- Species: P. nyongensis

Binomial name
- Prolabeops nyongensis Daget, 1984

Species of fish

Prolabeops nyongensis is a cyprinid fish in the genus Prolabeops. It inhabits Cameroon and has been assessed as "data deficient" on the IUCN Red List.
