= Prolabeo =

Conservation status
- Data Deficient (IUCN 3.1)

Scientific classification
- Kingdom: Animalia
- Phylum: Chordata
- Class: Actinopterygii
- Order: Cypriniformes
- Family: Cyprinidae
- Subfamily: Smiliogastrinae
- Genus: Prolabeo; Norman, 1932
- Species: P. batesi

Binomial name
- Prolabeo batesi Norman, 1932

Monotypic genus of fish

Prolabeo is a monospecific genus of freshwater ray-finned fish in the family Cyprinidae, which includes the carps, barbs and related fishes. The only species in the genus is Prolabeo batesi, a species endemic to Sierra Leone.

== Taxonomy ==
Prolabeo was first proposed as a monospecific genus in 1932 by the English ichthyologist John Roxborough Norman when he described its only known species, Prolabeo batesi, giving its type locality as the tributaries of the Bagwe River in Sierra Leone. This taxon is classified within the subfamily Smiliogastrinae within the family Cyprinidae. Within the Smiliogastrinae, Prolabeo batesi has been recovered as the sister taxon to Enteromius trispilos and a 2022 analysis suggested that E. trispilos be classified within Prolabeo.

== Etymology ==
Prolabeo prefixes pro-, meaning 'before' or 'in front of', to labeo, which means 'having large lips', a reference to the flap above the upper lip hanging over the mouth. The specific name honours the collector of the holotype of this species for the Natural History Museum, the American farmer and amateur ornithologist George Latimer Bates.

== Description ==
Prolabeo has eleven soft rays supporting the dorsal fin, eight of which are branched and the remainder of which are simple, with the last simple ray nearly the same length as the head and eight soft rays supporting the anal fin. The mouth is small and downwards-pointing with its lower lip covered in a slender layer of horn-like material. There is a transverse, deeply notched lobe covering the upper lip. P. batesi reaches a maximum published total length of 10.5 cm (4.1 in)

== Distribution and habitat ==
Prolabeo is a demersal fish endemic to Sierra Leone, where it is known to occur in the Sewa, Rokel, Pampana, Little Scarcies and Jong Rivers.
