= Clypeobarbus =

Scientific classification
- Kingdom: Animalia
- Phylum: Chordata
- Class: Actinopterygii
- Order: Cypriniformes
- Family: Cyprinidae
- Subfamily: Smiliogastrinae
- Genus: Clypeobarbus; Fowler, 1936

Type species
- Barbus kemoensis Fowler 1936

Species
- See list

Genus of fishes

Clypeobarbus is a genus of small cyprinid fishes native to Africa. Most species are restricted to the Congo River Basin, but C. pleuropholis is also found in the Chad Basin, while C. bellcrossi is from the Zambezi and C. hypsolepis is from rivers in Western Africa.

== Species ==
There are currently 9 recognized species in this genus:

- Clypeobarbus bellcrossi (R. A. Jubb, 1965) (Gorgeous barb)
- Clypeobarbus bomokandi (G. S. Myers, 1924)
- Clypeobarbus breviclipeus Stiassny & Sakharova, 2016
- Clypeobarbus congicus (Boulenger, 1899) (Congo barb)
- Clypeobarbus hypsolepis (Daget, 1959)
- Clypeobarbus matthesi (Poll & J. P. Gosse, 1963)
- Clypeobarbus pleuropholis (Boulenger, 1899)
- Clypeobarbus pseudognathodon (Boulenger, 1915)
- Clypeobarbus schoutedeni (Poll & J. G. Lambert, 1961)
