= Puntigrus navjotsodhii =

Conservation status
- Least Concern (IUCN 3.1)

Scientific classification
- Kingdom: Animalia
- Phylum: Chordata
- Class: Actinopterygii
- Order: Cypriniformes
- Family: Cyprinidae
- Subfamily: Smiliogastrinae
- Genus: Puntigrus
- Species: P. navjotsodhii

Binomial name
- Puntigrus navjotsodhii (H. H. Tan, 2012)

Synonyms
- Systomus navjotsodhii H. H. Tan, 2012

Species of fish

Puntigrus navjotsodhii is a species of cyprinid fish endemic to the upper Katingan and Barito basins in central Borneo. This species can grow to a standard length of 4.8 cm (1.9 in).
