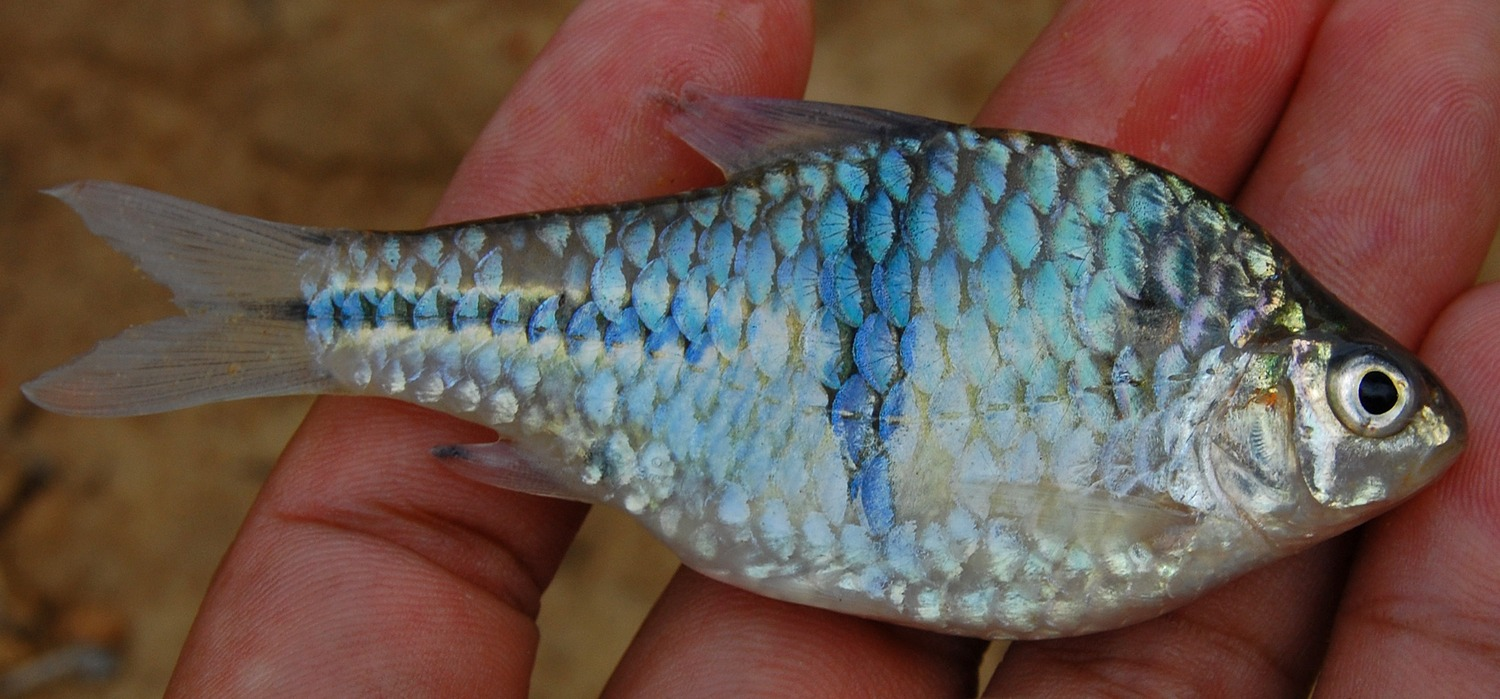

Conservation status
- Least Concern (IUCN 3.1)

Scientific classification
- Kingdom: Animalia
- Phylum: Chordata
- Class: Actinopterygii
- Order: Cypriniformes
- Family: Cyprinidae
- Genus: Striuntius
- Species: S. lateristriga

Binomial name
- Striuntius lateristriga (Valenciennes, 1842)

Synonyms
- Barbus lateristriga Valenciennes, 1842; Puntius lateristriga (Valenciennes, 1842); Systomus lateristriga (Valenciennes, 1842); Barbodes lateristriga (Valenciennes, 1842)

= Spanner barb =

Species of fish

The spanner barb (Striuntius lateristriga), or T-barb, is a species of cyprinid fish native to the Malay Peninsula and the island of Borneo. It can reach a length of 18 centimetres (7.1 in) TL. This species can also be found in the aquarium trade.

== Distribution and habitat ==
This species is an inhabitant of clear streams in mountain areas, particularly common at the base of waterfalls. They are native to the Malay Peninsula and Borneo. It prefers areas with plentiful boulders and rocky stream beds.

== Diet ==
Its diet consists of such invertebrates as insects, worms and crustaceans as well as plant material.

== Reproduction ==
The spanner barb scatters it eggs in the substrate and then abandons them.

== In the aquarium ==
In an aquarium the spanner barb will adapt to water up to a pH of 7.2, and can live in slightly harder water than in their natural habitat. They are a mostly peaceful fish if kept in a school of at least five fish, but their large size makes them unsuited to a community of small fish.

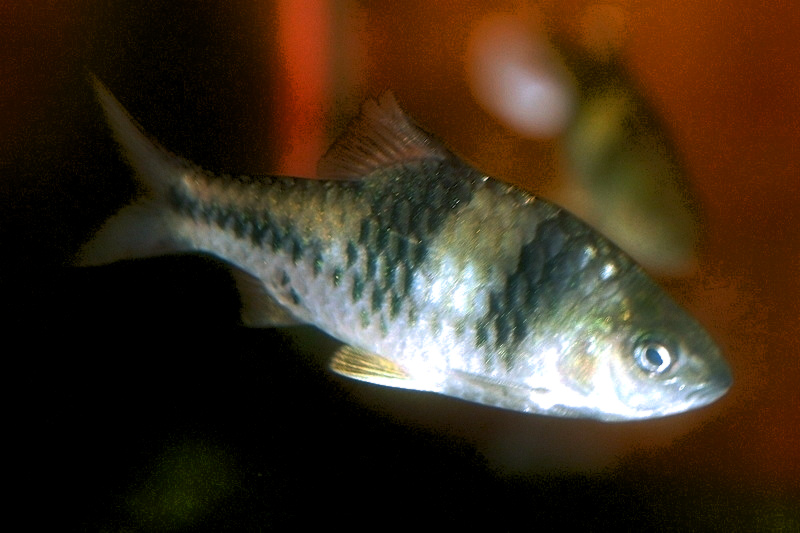

== See also ==
- List of freshwater aquarium fish species
