= Coptostomabarbus bellcrossi =

Conservation status
- Data Deficient (IUCN 3.1)

Scientific classification
- Kingdom: Animalia
- Phylum: Chordata
- Class: Actinopterygii
- Order: Cypriniformes
- Family: Cyprinidae
- Genus: Coptostomabarbus
- Species: C. bellcrossi

Binomial name
- Coptostomabarbus bellcrossi Poll, 1969

Species of fish

Coptostomabarbus bellcrossi is a species of cyprinid in the genus Coptostomabarbus that inhabits Zambia.
