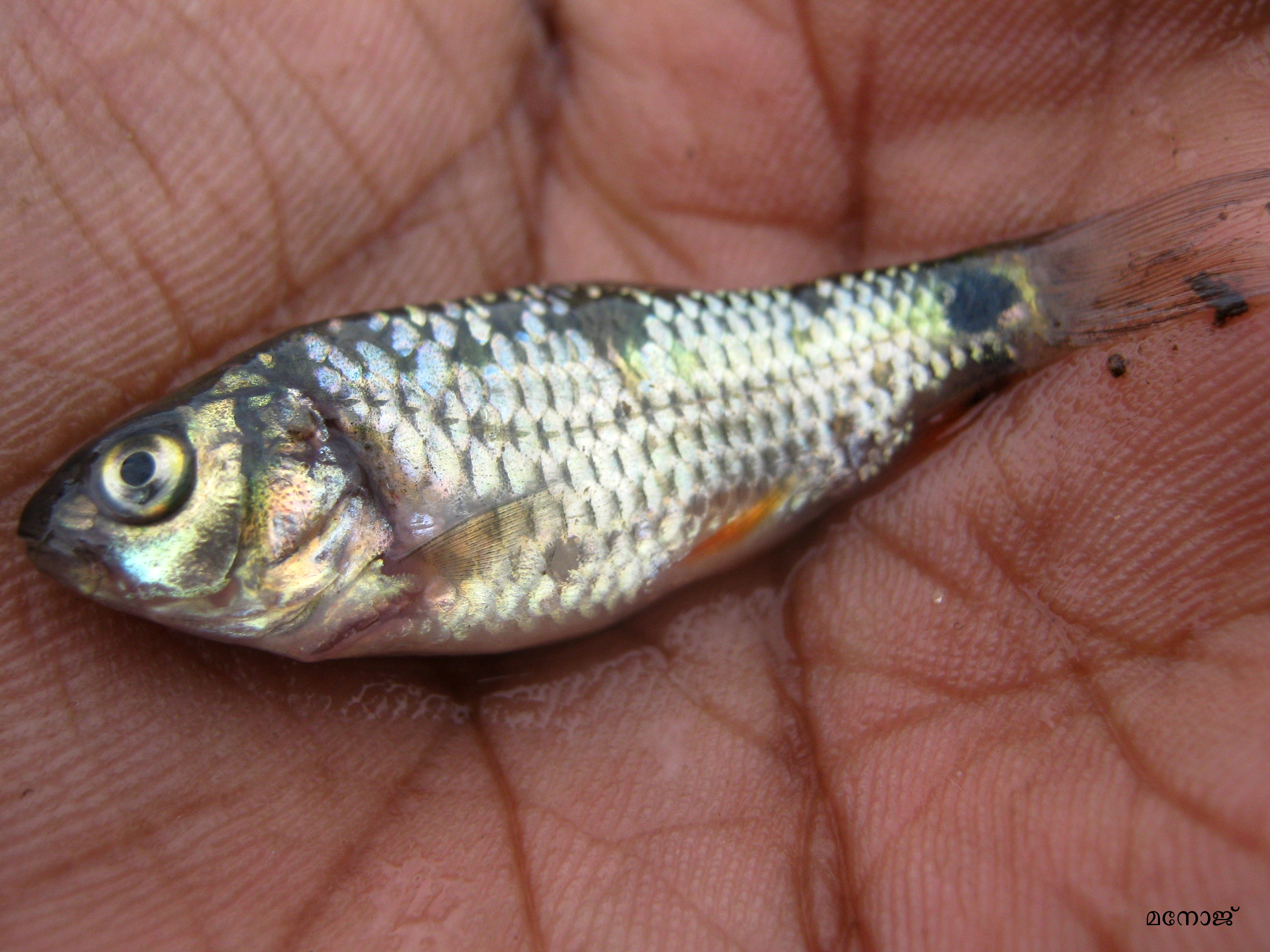
- Puntius bimaculatus male

Conservation status
- Least Concern (IUCN 3.1)

Scientific classification
- Kingdom: Animalia
- Phylum: Chordata
- Class: Actinopterygii
- Order: Cypriniformes
- Family: Cyprinidae
- Subfamily: Smiliogastrinae
- Genus: Plesiopuntius; Sudasinghe, Rüber & Meegaskumbura, 2023
- Species: P. bimaculatus

Binomial name
- Plesiopuntius bimaculatus (Bleeker, 1863)

Synonyms
- Gnathopogon bimaculatus Bleeker, 1863; Puntius bimaculatus (Bleeker 1863); Puntius puckelli Day, 1868; Barbus puckelli (Day, 1868)

= Redside barb =

Species of fish

The redside barb or two-spot barb (Plesiopuntius bimaculatus) is a species of ray-finned fish in the genus Puntius. It is found in India and Sri Lanka. It was identified and classified by Pieter Bleeker in 1863.

== Description ==
The redside barb is a small fish with a slender, compressed, torpedo-shaped body. The adult size for both the sexes is maximum 7 cm. This species exhibits sexual dimorphism, which allows for easy identification of the sexes. It has two black spots: one at the base of the dorsal fin and one at the junction of body and caudal fin. There is a colored band from its eyes to the spot at the caudal fin. In mature males, the band has a distinct dark red coloration in the middle with a bronze-greenish-colored stripe above the red band. The eyes have a red-colored outer semi-circle. In females, the red is less pronounced and the bronze-colored band will be difficult to distinguish from its body scale color. The females has a slightly plumper body.

== Habitat ==
The redside barb lives in hill streams, lowland swamps and dry zone rivers and tanks. They are benthopelagic and feed on green algae and detritus.{2,3}. They live on water with pH range 6.5 - 7.5 and dH 5-15.It is found abundantly in the river bank, lowland and hilly stream in Tripura caught mostly by the indigenous tribes

== In the aquarium ==
Redside barbs are very active, fast swimmers and are very peaceful towards other tank mates. They will be attractive in a school of more than 6. They love moderate currents and swim against it. With a free space to dart around they would appreciate hiding spots between plants, driftwoods and rocks. In a planted tank they use to nibble the green algae from the leaves. They are non fussy eaters and accepts most of the prepared foods. In a school the most dominant male would be showing brilliantly colored red stripe with a greenish bronze colored upper band. It is not known about its breeding in the aquarium. Being of peaceful temperament they are suitable to most of the community aquaria.

== Commercial importance ==
The redside barb is important in the aquarium trade {4}.
