= Channa barb =

Conservation status
- Endangered (IUCN 3.1)

Scientific classification
- Kingdom: Animalia
- Phylum: Chordata
- Class: Actinopterygii
- Order: Cypriniformes
- Family: Cyprinidae
- Subfamily: Smiliogastrinae
- Genus: Eechathalakenda; Menon, 1999
- Species: E. ophicephalus

Binomial name
- Eechathalakenda ophicephalus (B. S. Raj, 1941)

Synonyms
- Barbus ophicephalus Raj, 1941 Puntius ophicephalus (Raj, 1941)

Species of fish

The Channa barb (Eechathalakenda ophicephalus) is a species of ray-finned fish belonging to the family Cyprinidae, the family which includes the carps, barbs and related fishes. It is the only species in the monospecific genus Eechathalakenda, although this species was formerly placed in the genus Puntius. This species is endemic to the Western Ghats in southern India.

== Taxonomy ==
The channa barb was first formally described as Barbus (Puntius) ophicephalus in 1941 by the Indian zoologist B. Sundara Raj with its type locality given as "Kaller River, tributary of Pambiyar River, a few miles south of Periyar Lake, Kerala, Travancore, India". In 1999 Ambat Gopalan Kutty Menon proposed the new monotypic genus Eechathalakenda for this species. This taxon is classified within the subfamily Smiliogastrinae within the family Cyprinidae.

== Etymology ==
The channa barb is the only known member of the genus Eechathalakenda which is the Tamil nemse for this fish, with kenda being the word for "carp" in that lkanguage. The specific name, ophicephalus, means "snake head", an allusion not explained by B. Sundara Raj. However, A. G. K. Menon did refer to the elongate shape of this fish and likened it to that of a snakehead of the genus Channa when he described its new genus.

== Description ==
The channa barb has two pairs of barbels, with both rostral and maxillary pairs. There are between 40 and 42 scales in the lateral line.The back is golden-brown and the ventral surface is silvery-brown with a wide, dark band along the lateral line. This species has a maximum published total length of 19.6 cm (7.7 in).

== Distribution and habitat ==
The channa barb is endemic to southern India where it is restricted to the southern Western Ghats/ It has been recorded from the Periyar, Pamba and Meenachil rivers in Kerala, and has also been reported from the Vaigai River in Tamil Nadu.This fish is found in deep rocky pools of fast flowing hill streams with a substrate of cobble and gravel.

== Conservation status ==
The channa barb has been assessed as Endangered by the International Union for Conservation of Nature because it has a restricted range, occurs in a few locations within that range and is threatened by invasive non-native fishes.
