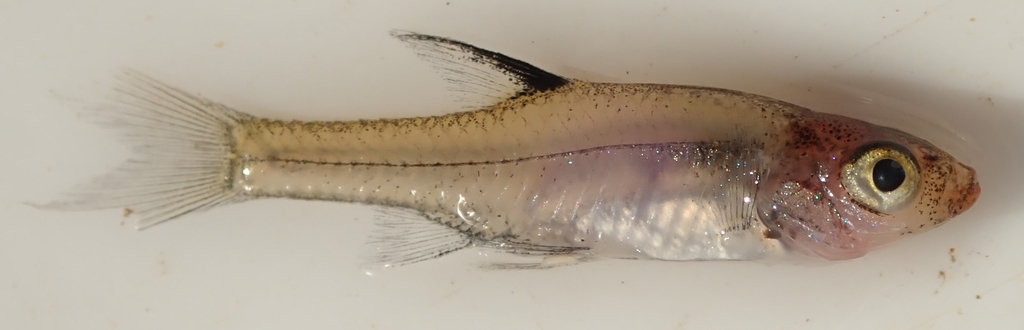

Conservation status
- Least Concern (IUCN 3.1)

Scientific classification
- Kingdom: Animalia
- Phylum: Chordata
- Class: Actinopterygii
- Order: Cypriniformes
- Family: Cyprinidae
- Genus: Coptostomabarbus
- Species: C. wittei

Binomial name
- Coptostomabarbus wittei David & Poll, 1937

= Coptostomabarbus wittei =

Species of fish

Coptostomabarbus wittei, the upjaw barb, is a species of cyprinid in the genus Coptostomabarbus. It inhabits Angola, Botswana, the Democratic Republic of the Congo, Zambia and Zimbabwe. It is used by humans as food.
