= Xenobarbus =

Conservation status
- Data Deficient (IUCN 3.1)

Scientific classification
- Kingdom: Animalia
- Phylum: Chordata
- Class: Actinopterygii
- Order: Cypriniformes
- Family: Cyprinidae
- Subfamily: Smiliogastrinae
- Genus: Xenobarbus; Norman, 1923
- Species: X. loveridgei

Binomial name
- Xenobarbus loveridgei Norman, 1923

Monotypic genus of fishes

Xenobarbus is a monospecific genus of freshwater ray-fiined fish belonging to the family Cyprinidae. the family which includes the carps, barbs and related fishes. The only species in the genus is Xenobarbus loveridgei which is endemic to Tanzania where it is found in Lake Victoria. The species is rare and only known from a few specimens.
