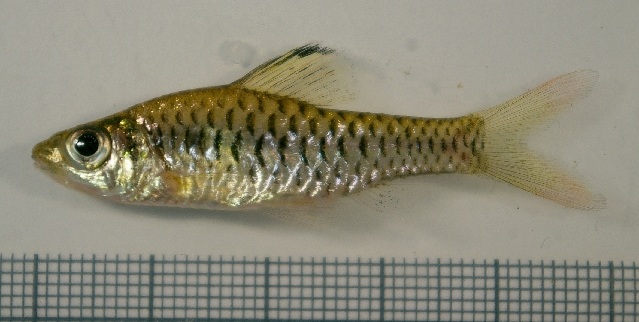

Conservation status
- Least Concern (IUCN 3.1)

Scientific classification
- Kingdom: Animalia
- Phylum: Chordata
- Class: Actinopterygii
- Order: Cypriniformes
- Family: Cyprinidae
- Subfamily: Smiliogastrinae
- Genus: Oreichthys
- Species: O. cosuatis

Binomial name
- Oreichthys cosuatis (F. Hamilton, 1822)

Synonyms
- Cyprinus cosuatis Hamilton, 1822; Puntius cosuatis (Hamilton, 1822)

= Oreichthys cosuatis =

Species of fish

Oreichthys cosuatis is a small (~3.2 in (81 mm) TL) cyprinid fish found in India and Bangladesh.In India it is found along the Ganga and Brahmaputra river drainages in the states of West Bengal and Odisha. It is also reported from Thailand and Myanmar.

They are strictly freshwater, and are found in ditches, ponds, streams and canals.

In an aquarium, they are generally peaceful, and tend not to bother other fishes, even those much smaller than they are although they are susceptible to be bullied by larger more boisterous fish. They prefer cooler water (76 °F (24 °C) at most, although higher temps are tolerated in the short term providing oxygen levels do not drop). Gentle water flow is preferred and be sure to use a soft substrate as this fish has sensitive bristles which it uses whilst foraging.

Oreichthys cosuatis is found in the Ganges and Brahmaputra River systems in India, Bangladesh and Nepal. This fish favours slow flowing areas of rivers with dense vegetation and clear water. This fish reaches around 40 mm (1.6 in) with the male growing slightly larger than the females. Males are also slightly more colourful and they have an extended dorsal fin.
