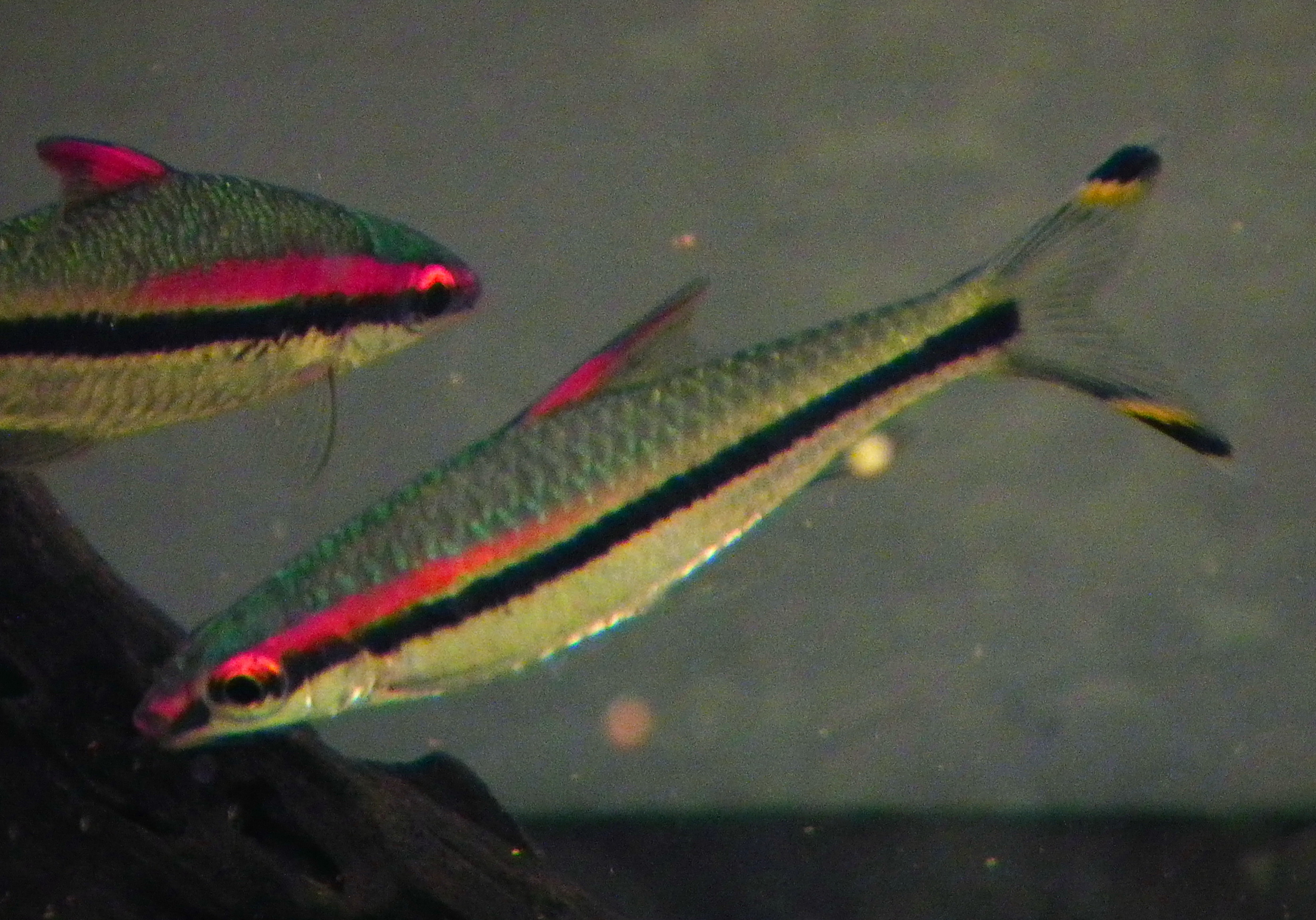
- Denison barb (Puntius denisonii)

Scientific classification
- Kingdom: Animalia
- Phylum: Chordata
- Class: Actinopterygii
- Division: Teleostei
- Order: Cypriniformes
- Family: Cyprinidae
- Subfamily: Smiliogastrinae; Bleeker, 1863

= Smiliogastrinae =

Smiliogastrinae Temporal range: Eocene–present

Subfamily of fishes

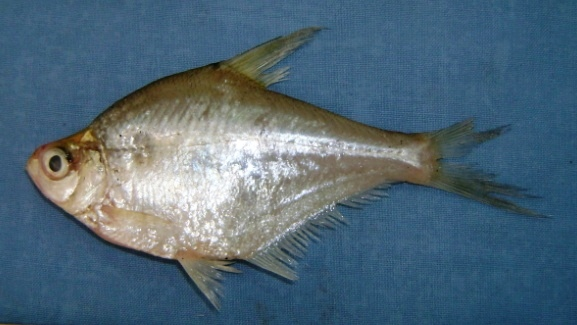

Smiliogastrinae is a subfamily of freshwater ray-finned fishes belonging to the family Cyprinidae, the family which includes the carps, barbs and related fishes. The fishes in this genus are found in Africa and Asia and are commonly referred to as barbs.

== Genera ==
Smiliogastrinae contains the following genera:

- Amatolacypris Skelton, Swartz & Vreven, 2018
- Barbodes Bleeker, 1859
- Barboides Brüning, 1929
- Bhava Sudasinghe, Rüber & Meegaskumbura, 2023
- Caecobarbus Boulenger, 1921
- Chagunius H.M. Smith, 1938
- Cheilobarbus A. Smith 1841
- Clypeobarbus Fowler, 1936
- Coptostomabarbus David & Poll 1937
- Dawkinsia Pethiyagoda, Meegaskumbura & Maduwage, 2012
- Desmopuntius Kottelat, 2013
- Eechathalakenda Menon, 1999
- Enteromius Cope, 1867
- Gymnodiptychus Herzenstein, 1892
- Haludaria Pethiyagoda, 2013
- Hampala Kuhl & van Hasselt, 1823
- Namaquacypris Skelton, Swartz & Vreven, 2018
- Oliotius Kottelat, 2013
- Oreichthys H. M. Smith, 1933
- Osteobrama Heckel, 1843
- Pethia Pethiyagoda, Meegaskumbura & Maduwage, 2012
- Plesiopuntius Sudasinghe, Rüber & Meegaskumbura, 2023
- Prolabeo Norman, 1932
- Prolabeops Schultz, 1941
- Pseudobarbus A. Smith, 1841
- Puntigrus Kottelat, 2013
- Puntius Hamilton, 1822
- Rohanella Sudasinghe, Rüber & Meegaskumbura, 2023
- Rohtee Sykes 1839
- Sedercypris Skelton, Swartz & Vreven, 2018
- Striuntius Kottelat, 2013
- Systomus McClelland, 1838
- Waikhomia Katwate, Kumkar, Raghavan & Dahanukar, 2020
- Xenobarbus Norman, 1923

One potential fossil genus is known in †Pauciuncus Murray, 2020 from the early-mid Eocene of Indonesia, as well as †Tchunglinius Wang & Wu, 2014 from the mid-Oligocene of Tibet.
