= List of fishes of Bangladesh =

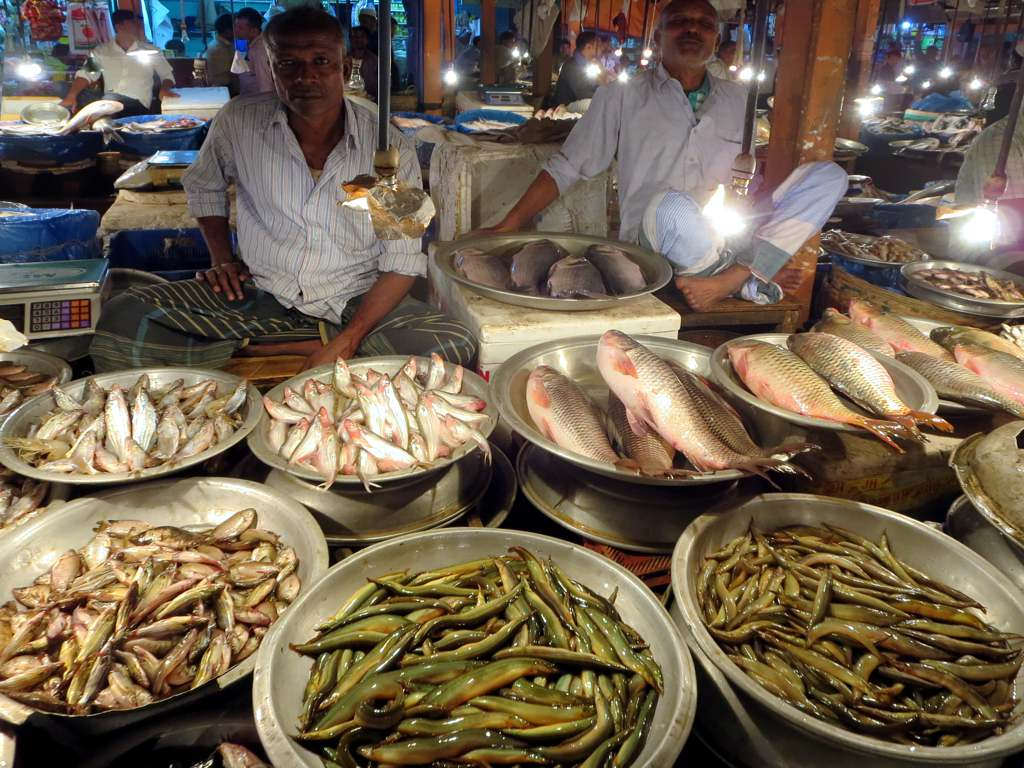
A fish market in Sylhet

Bangladesh is a country with thousands of rivers and ponds, and is notable as a fish-loving nation, acquiring the name machh-e bhat-e Bangali (which means, "Bengali by fish and rice").

Ilish is the national fish of the country, and contributes 13% of country's total fish production. Fish are both caught from the wild and farmed in artificial ponds.

== Fishes of Bangladesh ==
Bengali also has a generic term for three related fish species from the family Polynemidae. A lakkha fish (লাক্ষা মাছ) may be Eleutheronema tetradactylum, Leptomelanosoma indicum or Polydactylus sexfilis. Another example is that of tengra (টেংরা) which is used to denote several species of catfishes from the families Mystus and Batasio. (Note: See the list for all the species called tengra in Bengali.)

Bengali has multiple synonyms for a single species and a single word for multiple species (a generic term) as shown in the list below.

Bengali name	Name in Bengali characters	Status	English common name	Scientific name	Image	Order
Artamim, ar or ayir	আইড়, আরটামিম or আড়	native	Long-whiskered catfish	Sperata aor		Siluriformes
Along or elong	এলং	native	Bengal barb	Megarasbora elanga	Rasbora elanga Achilles 146	Cypriniformes
Anju	আনজু	native	Zebrafish	Danio rerio		Cypriniformes
Arowari or ghagla or gong tengra	আরওয়ারি or ঘাগলা or গাং টেংরা	native	Menoda catfish	Hemibagrus menoda	Macrones corsula Mintern 100	Siluriformes
Bagair	বাগাইর or বাঘাইর	native	Goonch	Bagarius bagarius		Siluriformes
Baan or baanehara	বানমাছ বানেহারা	native	Indian mottled eel	Anguilla bengalensis bengalensis		Anguilliformes
Baan, pakal or bamush	বানমাছ পাঁকাল বামুশ	native	Bengal eel	Ophisternon bengalense	OphisternBengalensffish.asia	Synbranchiformes
Bailla or bele	বাইলা or বেলে	native		Awaous guamensis		Gobiiformes
Baim	বাইম	native	Zig-zag eel or tire-track eel	Mastacembelus armatus	Tire track eel	Synbranchiformes
Boitka or Ghora muikha or Ghora mach or longu rui	বইটকা, ঘোড়া মুইখা, ঘোড়া মাছ or লংগু রুই	native		Labeo pangusia		Cypriniformes
Bhetki or koral	ভেটকী or কোরাল	native	Barramundi	Lates calcarifer		Carangiformes
Balichura or belitora	বালিচুরা, বেলিটোরা or বেলিটুরা	native	Balitora minnow	Psilorhynchus balitora		Cypriniformes
Balichura	বালিচুরা	native	Rainbow minnow	Psilorhynchus nudithoracicus		Cypriniformes
Bansh-pata or debari	বাঁশপাতা or দেবারি	native	Sind danio	Devario devario		Cypriniformes
Bansh-pata or bati	বাঁশপাতা or বাটা	native	Broad-mouthed mullet or large-scaled mullet	Paramugil parmatus		Mugiliformes
Barali	বারালি or বোরালি	native	Barred baril	Barilius barila		Cypriniformes
Baril or joiya	বারিল or জইয়া	native	Hamilton's barila	Opsarius bendelisis		Cypriniformes
Basa fish	বাসা or পাংগাস	introduced	Basa fish	Pangasius bocourti		Siluriformes
Bata or bangna	বাটা or বাংনা	native	Reba	Labeo ariza		Cypriniformes
Bata	বাটা	native	Bata	Labeo bata		Cypriniformes
Batasi	বাতাসি	native	Indian batasi	Pachypterus atherinoides		Siluriformes
Bechi	বেচি	native	Whitespot or blue panchax	Aplocheilus panchax		Cyprinodontiformes
Bailla or bele or dorakata bele	বাইলা or বেলে or ডোরাকাটা বেলে	native	Scribbled goby	Awaous grammepomus		Gobiiformes
Bhadi puti	ভাদি পুঁটি	native	Pool barb	Puntius sophore		Cypriniformes
Bhangan	ভাঙন or ভাঙ্গন	native	Boga labeo	Labeo boga		Cypriniformes
Bhol	ভোল	native	Trout barb	Raiamas bola		Cypriniformes
Bhola bhetki	ভোলা ভেটকি	native	Soldier croaker	Nibea soldado		Acanthuriformes
Kuli or bhut bele	কুলি or ভূত বেলে	native	Dusky sleeper	Eleotris fusca		Gobiiformes
Bilchuri	বিলচুরি	native	Mottled loach	Acanthocobitis botia		Cypriniformes
Boaal	বোয়াল	native	Wallago	Wallago attu		Siluriformes
Borguni	বোরগুনি	native	Jarbua terapon	Terapon jarbua		Centrarchiformes
Bou or rani	বৌমাছ or রানি	native	Bengal loach	Botia dario		Cypriniformes
Bou mach	বৌমাছ or রানি	questionable	Zebra loach	Botia striata		Cypriniformes
Murari	মুরারি	native	Carplet	Cabdio morar		Cypriniformes
Magor or shing	মাগুর or শিঙি মাছ	native	Torrent catfish	Amblyceps mangois		Siluriformes
Gong tengra	গং টেংরা	native		Gagata gagata		Siluriformes
Magur or shing	মাগুর or শিঙি মাছ	native		Gagata youssoufi		Siluriformes
Chandan ilish	চন্দনা or চন্দন ইলিশ	native	Toli shad	Tenualosa toli		Clupeiformes
Chapila or khoyra	চাপিলা or খয়রা	native	Ganges River gizzard shad	Gonialosa manmina		Clupeiformes
Chapila	চাপিলা	native	Indian river shad	Gudusia chapra		Clupeiformes
Chebli	চেবলি	native	Giant danio	Devario aequipinnatus		Cypriniformes
Chaka	চাকা	native	Squarehead catfish	Chaca chaca		Siluriformes
Chela	চেলা	questionable	Silver razorbelly minnow	Salmostoma acinaces		Cypriniformes
Chep chela or laubucha	চেপ চেলা or লাউবুচা	native	Indian glass barb	Laubuka laubuca		Cypriniformes
Chewa	চেওয়া	native		Pseudapocryptes elongatus		Gobiiformes
Chitol	চিতল or চেতল	native	Clown knifefish	Chitala chitala		Osteoglossiformes
Pholi or foli	ফলি	native	Bronze featherback	Notopterus notopterus		Osteoglossiformes
Chuno or chuna khoilsha	চুনো or চুনা খইলশা	native	Honey gourami	Trichogaster chuna		Anabantiformes
Chuno bele	চুনো বেলে	native		Gobiopterus chuno		Gobiiformes
Common carp	কমন কার্প	introduced	Common carp	Cyprinus carpio carpio		Cypriniformes
Dahuk	ডাহুক	native	Boddart's goggle-eyed goby	Boleophthalmus boddarti		Gobiiformes
Dahuk or hatuni darak	ডাহুক or হাঁটুনি দারাক	native	Walking goby	Scartelaos histophorus		Gobiiformes
Dari	ডারি	native		Schistura scaturigina		Cypriniformes
Darkina	দারকিনা	native	Flying barb	Esomus danricus		Cypriniformes
Darkina	দারকিনা	native	Slender rasbora	Rasbora daniconius		Cypriniformes
Darkina	দারকিনা	native	Gangetic scissortail rasbora	Rasbora rasbora		Cypriniformes
Deshi koi	দেশি কই	native	Climbing perch	Anabas testudineus		Anabantiformes
Dhal magor	ঢাল মাগুর	native		Glyptothorax telchitta		Siluriformes
Ek thouta	এক থৌতা	questionable	Wrestling halfbeak	Dermogenys pusilla		Beloniformes
Gechua	গেছুয়া	native		Channa gachua		Anabantiformes
Gechua	গেছুয়া	native	Walking snakehead	Channa orientalis		Anabantiformes
Gagla	গাগলা	native	Gagora catfish	Arius gagora		Siluriformes
Gong magor	গং মাগুর	native	Gray eel-catfish	Plotosus canius		Siluriformes
Gong tengra	গাঙ টেংরা	native		Gagata cenia		Siluriformes
Gong tengra	গাঙ টেংরা	native		Gogangra viridescens		Siluriformes
Gong tengra	গাঙ টেংরা	native		Nangra nangra		Siluriformes
Kabashi tengra	গুলসা, গুলসা-টেংরা or কাবাশি টেংরা	native	Gangetic mystus	Mystus cavasius		Siluriformes
Ghor poi-ya	ঘর পোয়া	native	Sucker head	Garra gotyla		Cypriniformes
Ghonia	ঘনিয়া	native	Boggut labeo	Labeo boggut		Cypriniformes
Ghor poa	ঘর পোয়া	introduced		Garra annandalei		Cypriniformes
Ghora chela	ঘোড়া চেলা	native		Securicula gora		Cypriniformes
Ghora mach	ঘোড়া মাছ	native		Labeo dyocheilus		Cypriniformes
Gilipunti	গিলি পুঁটি	native	Golden barb	Pethia gelius		Cypriniformes
Gobi	বেলে	native	Mudskipper	Apocryptes bato		Gobiiformes
Goti poa	গোটি পোয়া	native	Largescale archerfish	Toxotes chatareus		Carangiformes
Gojar	গজার	native	Great snakehead	Channa marulius		Anabantiformes
Grass carp	গ্রাস কার্প	introduced	Grass carp	Ctenopharyngodon idella		Cypriniformes
Gura tengra	গুরা টেঙ্গরা	native		Chandramara chandramara		Siluriformes
Gutum or onnondeler puiya	গুতুম or অনন্ডলের পুঁইয়া	native	Annandale loach	Lepidocephalichthys annandalei		Cypriniformes
Gutum or Moricha puiya	গুতুম or মরিচা পুঁইয়া	native	Guntea loach	Lepidocephalichthys guntea		Cypriniformes
Gurjāli	গুরজালি or গুরজাউলি	native	Indian salmon	Eleutheronema tetradactylum		Carangiformes
Rupali kachni	রূপালী কাচনি	native	Freshwater hatchetfish	Chela cachius		Cypriniformes
Ilish	ইলিশ	native	Great ilish or hilsa	Tenualosa ilisha		Clupeiformes
Jaya	জয়া	native	Jaya	Cabdio jaya		Cypriniformes
Kechhki	কাচকি	native	Ganges river sprat	Corica soborna		Clupeiformes
Kechhki	কাচকি	native	Yellowtail mullet	Minimugil cascasia		Mugiliformes
Kajuli	কাজুলি	native	Gangetic ailia	Ailia coila		Siluriformes
Kajuli	কাজুলি	native	Jamuna ailia	Ailiichthys punctata		Siluriformes
Kakila	কাকিলা	native	Freshwater garfish	Xenentodon cancila		Beloniformes
Kalibaus	কালিবাউস or কালবোশ	native	Orange-fin labeo	Labeo calbasu		Cypriniformes
Kachon punti	কাচোন পুঁটি	native	Rosy barb	Pethia conchonius		Cypriniformes
Kani pabda	কানি পাবদা	native	Butter catfish	Ompok bimaculatus		Siluriformes
Kani tengra	কানি টেংরা	native		Glyptothorax cavia		Siluriformes
Kani tengra	কানি টেংরা	native	Painted catfish	Pseudolaguvia ribeiroi		Siluriformes
Kani tengra	কানি টেংরা	native		Pseudolaguvia shawi		Siluriformes
Karati hangar	করাতি হাঙর	native	Knifetooth sawfish	Anoxypristis cuspidata		Rhinopristiformes
Panpata sorbuti or kathal pata	পানপাতা সরবতি or কাঁঠাল পাতা	native	Pan sole	Brachirus pan		Carangiformes
Katla	কাতলা	native	Indian carp or Indian katla	Catla catla		Cypriniformes
Keti	কেটি	native		Osteobrama cotio		Cypriniformes
Kholshe, khoulsha or goroy	খলশে, খৌলশা or গরই	native	Banded gourami	Trichogaster fasciata		Anabantiformes
Khaksa	খাকসা	native	Barna baril	Opsarius barna		Cypriniformes
Kharu	খারু	native	Rice-paddy eel	Pisodonophis boro		Anguilliformes
Khorsula or khur khula	খোরসুলা or খর খুলা	native	Corsula	Rhinomugil corsula		Mugiliformes
Koi	কৈ	native	Climbing gourami	Anabas cobojius		Anabantiformes
Koi koral	কৈ কোরাল	native	Atlantic tripletail	Lobotes surinamensis		Acanthuriformes
Koirka	কৈরকা	native		Nemacheilus corica		Cypriniformes
Koitor	কোইটুর	native	Coitor croaker	Johnius coitor		Acanthuriformes
Koksa	কোকসা or ককসা	native		Barilius shacra		Cypriniformes
Kosuati or kosa puti	কোসুয়াটি or কোসা পুঁটি	native		Oreichthys cosuatis		Cypriniformes
Kuchia	কুঁচে, কুচিয়া or কুইচ্চা	native	Swamp eel	Monopterus cuchia		Synbranchiformes
Kuli	কুলি	native	Duckbill sleeper	Butis butis		Gobiiformes
Kumirer khil	কুমিরের খিল	native	Deocata pipefish	Microphis deocata		Syngnathiformes
Kursha or Katol kushi	কুরসা or কাতল কুশি	native	Kalabans	Sinilabeo dero		Cypriniformes
Kuta kanti	কুটি কানটি	native	Conta catfish	Erethistes pusillus		Siluriformes
Lal kholisha	লাল খোলিশা or খলশে	native	Dwarf gourami	Trichogaster lalius		Anabantiformes
Lotey	লোটে, ল্যাটা, লেটা or লইট্যা	native	Bombay duck	Harpadon nehereus		Aulopiformes
Lomba chanda or Nama chanda	লম্বা চাঁদা or নামা চান্দা	native	Elongate glassy perchlet	Chanda nama		Incertae sedis
Modhu pabda or pabda	মধু পাবদা or পাবদা	native	Pabdah catfish	Ompok pabda		Siluriformes
Magur	মাগুর	introduced	Walking catfish	Clarias batrachus		Siluriformes
Pahari kala bata	পাহাড়ি কালা বাটা	native	Gangetic latia	Tariqilabeo latius		Cypriniformes
Mola punti	মলা পুঁটি	native	Glass barb	Pethia guganio		Cypriniformes
Mola	মলা	native	Indian carplet	Amblypharyngodon microlepis	Amblypharyngodon microlepis Day 135	Cypriniformes
Mōŭralā	মৌরলা	native	Mola carplet	Amblypharyngodon mola		Cypriniformes
Mrigel	মৃগেল or মিরগেল	native	Mrigal carp	Cirrhinus cirrhosus		Cypriniformes
Muri bacha	মুরি বাচা	native		Eutropiichthys murius		Siluriformes
Muribacha	মুরিবাচা	native	Garua bachcha	Clupisoma garua		Siluriformes
Nandil	নানডিল	native		Labeo nandina		Cypriniformes
Napte koi	নাপতে কই	native	Badis	Badis badis		Anabantiformes
Neftani or naftani	নেফটেনি or নাফতানি	native	Frail gourami	Ctenops nobilis		Anabantiformes
Nilotica	নিলোটিকা	introduced	Nile tilapia	Oreochromis niloticus		Cichliformes
Nodoy, meni or royna	নদয়, মেনি মাছ, ভেদা মাছ or রয়না মাছ	native	Gangetic leaffish	Nandus nandus		Anabantiformes
Nuna bailla	নুনা বেলে or নুনা বাইলা	native	Golden banded goby	Brachygobius nunus		Gobiiformes
Nuna-tengra	নুনা টেংরা	native	Long whiskers catfish	Mystus gulio		Siluriformes
Gofalo nipati	গোঁফালো নিপাতী	native	Moustached danio	Danio dangila		Cypriniformes
Pakal	পাঁকাল	native	Eel	Anguilliformes sp.		Anguilliformes
Panga	পাঙ্গা	native	Java loach	Pangio oblonga		Cypriniformes
Pangas	পাঙ্গাস or পাঙাশ	native	Yellowtail catfish	Pangasius pangasius		Siluriformes
Pankal baim or guchi baim	পনকাল বাইম, পাঁকাল বাম or গুচি বাইম	native	Barred spiny eel	Macrognathus pancalus		Synbranchiformes
Parshe or chaptamatha khorol	পারশে or চ্যাপ্টামাথা খরোল	native	Flathead grey mullet	Mugil cephalus		Mugiliformes
Pathar chata or tila koksa	পাথর চাটা or তিলা কোকসা	native		Opsarius tileo		Cypriniformes
Pettoli	পেট্টোলি	native	Bengal demoiselle	Pomacentrus bangladeshius		Blenniiformes
Phasa	ফাশা or ফ্যাঁসা	questionable	Gangetic hairfin anchovy	Setipinna phasa		Clupeiformes
Phopa chanda	ফোপা চান্দা or ফোঁপা চাঁদা	native	Himalayan glassy perchlet	Parambassis baculis		Incertae sedis
Phutani punti	ফুটনি পুঁটি	native	Spottedsail barb	Pethia phutunio		Cypriniformes
Poa	পোয়া	native	Pama croaker	Otolithoides pama		Acanthuriformes
Chanda or pomfret	চাঁদা or পমফ্রেট	native	Pomfret	Brama brama		Scombriformes
Potka	পটকা	native	Green pufferfish	Dichotomyctere fluviatilis		Tetraodontiformes
Shada fota dahuk	সাদা ফোঁটা ডাহুক	native	Giant mudskipper	Periophthalmodon schlosseri		Gobiiformes
Puiya	পুয়া	native	Burmese loach	Lepidocephalichthys berdmorei		Cypriniformes
Puti	পুঁটি	native	Swamp barb	Puntius chola		Cypriniformes
Punti or tit punti	পুঁটি or তিত পুঁটি	native	Ticto barb	Pethia ticto		Cypriniformes
Putitor mohashoul or shonali mohashoul	মহাশোল	native	Golden mahseer	Tor putitora		Cypriniformes
Rajputi or Thai sorputi	রাজ পুঁটি or থাই সরপুটি	introduced	Java barb	Barbonymus gonionotus		Cypriniformes
Ranga chanda	রাঙ্গা চান্দা or রাঙা চাঁদা	native	Indian glassy fish	Parambassis ranga		Incertae sedis
Rata boura	রাটা বউরা	native	Purple spaghetti-eel	Moringua raitaborua		Anguilliformes
Rita	রিটা or রিঠা	native	Rita	Rita rita		Siluriformes
Bacha or bachua bacha	বাচা or বাচুয়া বাচা	native	Bacha	Eutropiichthys vacha		Siluriformes
Rui or rohu	রুই	native	Indian rui or rohu	Labeo rohita		Cypriniformes
Sagorer Baila or Choto Tular Dati	সাগরের বইলা or ছোট তুলার দাতি	native		Sillago muktijoddhai		Acanthuriformes
Sapla pata	শাপলা পাটা	native	Pale-edged stingray	Telatrygon zugei		Myliobatiformes
Savon khorka	শভন খোরকা or স্যভন খোরকা	native		Schistura savona		Cypriniformes
Shada ghonia	সাদা ঘনিয়া	native	Kuria labeo	Labeo gonius		Cypriniformes
Shankhachii or dagi shankhachil	শানকাচি or দাগি শঙ্খচিল	native	Banded eagle ray	Aetomylaeus nichofii		Myliobatiformes
Shillong	শিলঙ্গ	native	Silond catfish	Silonia silondia		Siluriformes
Shingi or jhill shingi	শিঙি, শিঙ্গঘি or ঝিল শিংঘি	native	Stinging catfish	Heteropneustes fossilis		Siluriformes
Shol	শৌল or শোল	native	Snakehead murrel	Channa striata		Anabantiformes
Sarpunti	সরপুঁটি	native	Olive barb	Systomus sarana		Cypriniformes
Silver carp	সিলভার কার্প	introduced	Silver carp	Hypophthalmichthys molitrix		Cypriniformes
Surma	সুরমা	native	king mackerel	Scomberomorus cavalla		Scombriformes
Kuicha or lomba pakhnar shap bain	কুইচা or লম্বা পাখনার সাপ বাইন	native	Longfin snake-eel	Pisodonophis cancrivorus		Anguilliformes
Tengra or bajuri tengra	টেংরা or বাজুরী টেংরা	native		Mystus tengara		Siluriformes
Sunkush	শুনকুশ	questionable	Dwarf whipray	Himantura walga		Myliobatiformes
Taki	টাকি	native	Spotted snakehead	Channa punctata		Anabantiformes
Telapia	তেলাপিয়া	introduced	Blackchin tilapia	Sarotherodon melanotheron		Cichliformes
Tara baim	তারা বাইম	native	Lesser spiny eel	Macrognathus aculeatus		Synbranchiformes
Tengra	টেংরা	native	Striped dwarf catfish	Mystus vittatus		Siluriformes
Tengra or tista tengra or tista batasi	টেংরা, তিস্তা টেংরা or তিস্তা বাতাসি	native	Tista batasio	Batasio batasio		Siluriformes
Tepa or pati potka	ট্যাঁপা or পাতি পটকা	native	Ocellated pufferfish	Tetraodon cutcutia		Tetraodontiformes
Teri punti	টেরা পুঁনটি or টেরি পুঁটি	native	Onespot barb	Puntius terio		Cypriniformes
Tiashol or tila shol	টিয়াশোল or তিলা শোল	native	Barca snakehead	Channa barca		Anabantiformes
Telapia	তেলাপিয়া	introduced	Mozambique tilapia	Oreochromis mossambicus		Cichliformes
Topshe	তপসে or তপস্বী	native	Paradise threadfin	Polynemus paradiseus		Carangiformes
Titari	তিতারী	native	River stone carp	Psilorhynchus sucatio		Cypriniformes
Tor mahseer or mohashoul	মহাশির or মহাশোল	native	Tor mahseer	Tor tor	Tor tor - Hamilton. Illustration by Haludar	Cypriniformes
Uti or urti	উটি or উর্তি	native	Chaguni	Chagunius chagunio		Cypriniformes
