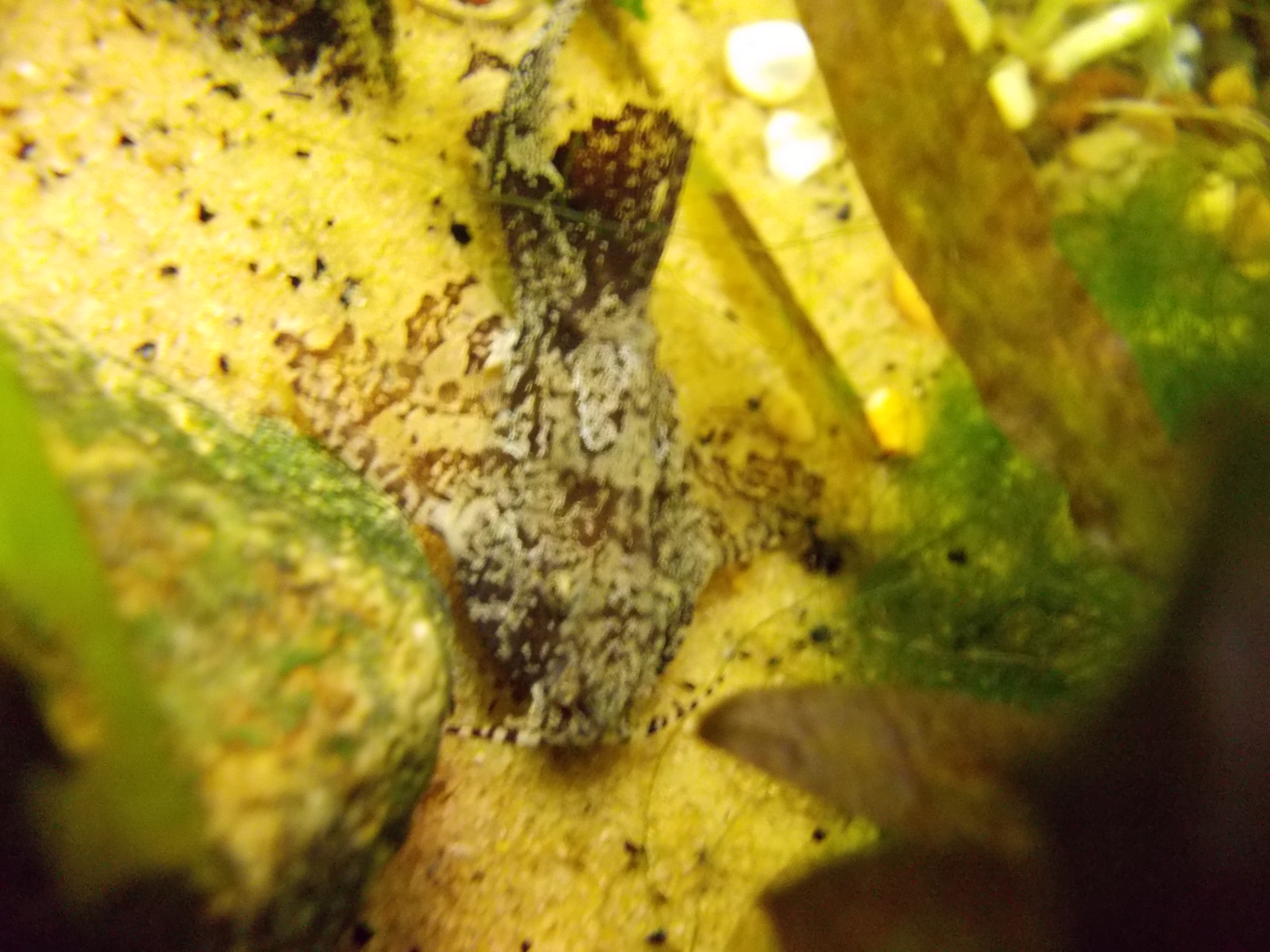
- Erethistes pusillus

Scientific classification
- Kingdom: Animalia
- Phylum: Chordata
- Class: Actinopterygii
- Order: Siluriformes
- Family: Sisoridae
- Subfamily: Sisorinae
- Genus: Erethistes; J. P. Müller & Troschel, 1849

Type species
- Erethistes pusillus Müller & Troschel, 1849

Synonyms
- Laguvia Hora, 1921; Hara Blyth, 1860

= Erethistes =

Genus of fishes

Erethistes is a genus of South Asian river catfishes.

== Species ==
There are currently 11 recognized species in this genus:

- Erethistes filamentosus (Blyth, 1860)
- Erethistes hara (Hamilton, 1822)
- Erethistes horai (Misra, 1976)
- Erethistes jerdoni (Day, 1870)
- Erethistes koladynensis (Anganthoibi & Vishwanath, 2009)
- Erethistes longissimus (Ng & Kottelat, 2007)
- Erethistes mesembrinus (Ng & Kottelat, 2007)
- Erethistes minusculus (Ng & Kottelat, 2007)
- Erethistes nareshi (Mahapatra & Kar, 2015)
- Erethistes pusillus J. P. Müller & Troschel, 1849
- Erethistes spinulus (Ng & Kottelat, 2007)

Synonyms

- Erethistes maesotensis Kottelat, 1983 valid as Erethistes filamentosus

== Distribution ==
This genus is distributed in the Ganges and Brahmaputra drainages in northern India and Nepal, and east and south to the Salween drainage on the border of Myanmar and Thailand.

== Description ==
Erethistes species lack a thoracic adhesive apparatus, a smooth to granulate anterior margin on a strong dorsal fin spine, a papillate upper lip, and 8–12 anal fin rays. The pectoral fin spine is serrated anteriorly and posteriorly. The anterior margin of the pectoral fin spine either has serrations all pointing toward tip of spine; arranged in divergent pairs; or outwardly directed and not divergent. The head is large and broad with a conical snout. The body is robust rather than slender as in some other erethistid genera, and is moderately short and flattened. All barbels are annulated with black rings.
