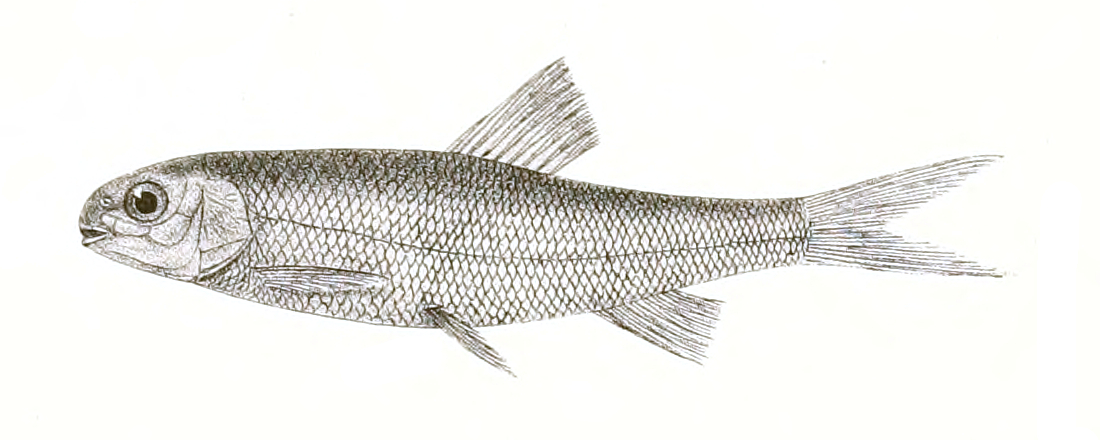
- A. jaya

Scientific classification
- Kingdom: Animalia
- Phylum: Chordata
- Class: Actinopterygii
- Division: Teleostei
- Order: Cypriniformes
- Family: Danionidae
- Subfamily: Danioninae
- Genus: Aspidoparia; Heckel, 1847

= Aspidoparia =

Genus of fishes

Aspidoparia is a small genus of cyprinid fishes that are found in South Asia. There are currently two recognized species in this genus.

== Species ==
There are currently two recognized species in this genus. In addition to these, Cabdio morar was formerly included in Aspidoparia.

- Aspidoparia jaya (F. Hamilton, 1822) (Jaya)
- Aspidoparia ukhrulensis Selim & Vishwanath, 2001
