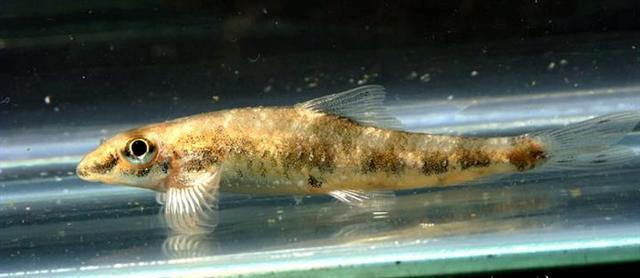
- Psilorhynchus balitora

Scientific classification
- Kingdom: Animalia
- Phylum: Chordata
- Class: Actinopterygii
- Order: Cypriniformes
- Suborder: Cyprinoidei
- Family: Psilorhynchidae; Hora, 1926
- Genus: Psilorhynchus; McClelland, 1838

Type species
- Cyprinus sucatio Hamilton, 1822

Synonyms
- Psilorhynchoides Yazdani, Singh & Rao, 1993

= Psilorhynchus =

Genus of ray-finned fishes

Psilorhynchus is a genus of small, benthic ray-finned fish in the family Psilorhynchidae native to South Asia. This genus is the only member of its family. Many members of Psilorhynchus occur in rivers and streams with fast to swift currents, hence they are often referred to as torrent minnows. They are distributed in southern Asia, in the Indo-Burma region and the Western Ghats.

The genus is the sister group to the family Cyprinidae, and with that family the Psilorhynchidae makes up the superfamily Cyprinoidea, with all the other cypriniform families in the superfamily Cobitoidea.

== Species ==
There are currently 33 recognized species in this genus:

- Psilorhynchus amplicephalus Arunachalam, Muralidharan & Sivakumar, 2007
- Psilorhynchus arunachalensis (Nebeshwar, Bagra & D. N. Das, 2007)
- Psilorhynchus balitora (Hamilton, 1822)
- Psilorhynchus bichomensis Shangningam, Kosygin & Gopi, 2019
- Psilorhynchus brachyrhynchus Conway & Britz, 2010
- Psilorhynchus breviminor Conway & Mayden, 2008
- Psilorhynchus chakpiensis Shangningam & Vishwanath, 2013
- Psilorhynchus gokkyi Conway & Britz, 2010
- Psilorhynchus hamiltoni Conway, Dittmer, Jezisek & H. H. Ng, 2013
- Psilorhynchus homaloptera Hora & Mukerji, 1935
- Psilorhynchus kaladanensis Lal Ramliana, Lal Nuntluanga & Lal Ronunga, 2015
- Psilorhynchus kamengensis Dey, Choudhury, Mazumder, Bharali, Thaosen & Sarma, 2020
- Psilorhynchus khopai Lalramliana, Solo, Lalronunga & Lalnuntluanga, 2014
- Psilorhynchus konemi Shangningam & Vishwanath, 2016
- Psilorhynchus kosygini Shangningam, 2024
- Psilorhynchus maculatus Shangningam & Vishwanath, 2013.
- Psilorhynchus magnaoculus Shangningam & Kosygin, 2021
- Psilorhynchus melissa Conway & Kottelat, 2010
- Psilorhynchus microphthalmus Vishwanath & Manojkumar, 1995
- Psilorhynchus nahlongthai Dey, Choudhury, Mazumder, Thaosen & Sarma, 2020
- Psilorhynchus nepalensis Conway & Mayden, 2008
- Psilorhynchus ngathanu Shangningam & Vishwanath, 2013
- Psilorhynchus nudithoracicus Tilak & Husain, 1980
- Psilorhynchus olliei Conway & Britz, 2015
- Psilorhynchus pavimentatus Conway & Kottelat, 2010
- Psilorhynchus piperatus Conway & Britz, 2010
- Psilorhynchus pseudecheneis Menon & A. K. Datta, 1964
- Psilorhynchus rahmani Conway & Mayden, 2008
- Psilorhynchus robustus Conway & Kottelat, 2007
- Psilorhynchus rowleyi Hora & Misra, 1941
- Psilorhynchus sucatio (Hamilton, 1822)
- Psilorhynchus tenura Arunachalam & Muralidharan, 2008.
- Psilorhynchus tysoni Conway & Pinion, 2016
