= Cabdio =

Scientific classification
- Kingdom: Animalia
- Phylum: Chordata
- Class: Actinopterygii
- Order: Cypriniformes
- Family: Danionidae
- Subfamily: Chedrinae
- Genus: Cabdio; Hamilton, 1822

Type species
- Cyprinus (Cabdio) jaya Hamilton, 1822

Synonyms
- Aspidoparia Heckel, 1847; Morara Bleeker, 1860

Genus of fishes

Cabdio is a genus of freshwater ray-finned fishes belonging to the family Danionidae, the danionins or danios. The fishes in this genus are found in western and southern Asia.

== Species ==
Cabdio contains the following species:

- Cabdio crassus Lalramliana, Lalronunga & Singh, 2019
- Cabdio jaya (Hamilton, 1822) (Jaya)
- Cabdio morar (Hamilton, 1822) (Morari)
- Cabdio occidentalis Jouladeh-Roudbar, Lalramliana, Vatendoust, Ghanavi & Freyhof, 2023
- Cabdio ukhrulensis (Selim & Vishwanath, 2001) (Ukhrul carp)
