= P. robustus =

P. robustus may refer to:

- Paranthropus robustus, an extinct hominin species dated to have lived between 2.0 and 1.2 million years ago
- Paraptenodytes robustus, an extinct penguin species found in Early Miocene rocks of the Patagonian Molasse Formation
- Poicephalus robustus, the cape parrot, a parrot species
- Psilorhynchus robustus, an Asian freshwater fish species found in Burma

== Synonyms ==
- Ptychostomus robustus, a synonym for Moxostoma robustum, the robust redhorse or smallfin redhorse, a freshwater fish species of the eastern United States
