= Gagata dolichonema =

Conservation status
- Least Concern (IUCN 3.1)

Scientific classification
- Domain: Eukaryota
- Kingdom: Animalia
- Phylum: Chordata
- Class: Actinopterygii
- Order: Siluriformes
- Family: Sisoridae
- Genus: Gagata
- Species: G. dolichonema

Binomial name
- Gagata dolichonema He, 1996

Synonyms
- Gagata gasawyuh Roberts & Ferraris, 1998

Species of fish

Gagata dolichonema is a species of sisorid catfish native to China, Myanmar, India, and Thailand. This species grows to a length of 13 centimetres (5.1 in) SL.
