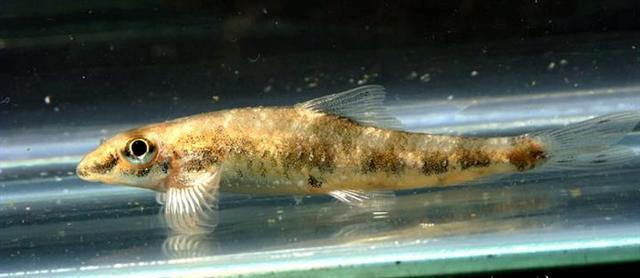

Conservation status
- Least Concern (IUCN 3.1)

Scientific classification
- Kingdom: Animalia
- Phylum: Chordata
- Class: Actinopterygii
- Order: Cypriniformes
- Family: Psilorhynchidae
- Genus: Psilorhynchus
- Species: P. balitora

Binomial name
- Psilorhynchus balitora Hamilton, 1822

Synonyms
- Cyprinus balitora Hamilton, 1822; Psilorhynchus variegatus McClelland, 1839

= Psilorhynchus balitora =

Species of fish

Psilorhynchus balitora or Balitora minnow is a species of torrent minnow found in South Asia. It is found in the drainage basins of the Ganges and the Brahmaputra in eastern Nepal, northeast Bangladesh and adjacent West Bengal and northwest Assam. It can be found in hill streams and in rapids with substrates consisting of pebbles or sand, preferring hard substrates. It is exported as an aquarium fish. Its maximum length is 8.1 centimeters.
