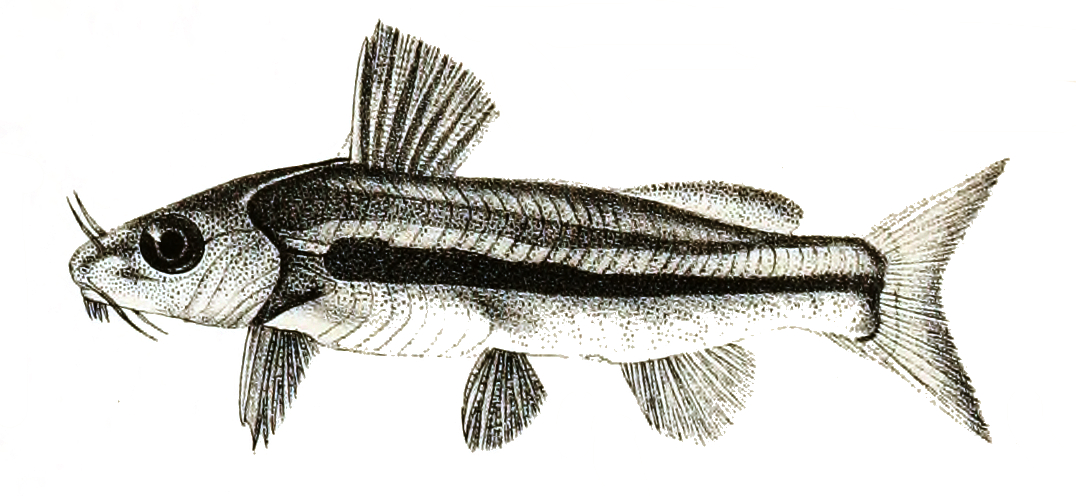

Conservation status
- Least Concern (IUCN 3.1)

Scientific classification
- Kingdom: Animalia
- Phylum: Chordata
- Class: Actinopterygii
- Order: Siluriformes
- Family: Bagridae
- Genus: Batasio
- Species: B. batasio

Binomial name
- Batasio batasio (F. Hamilton, 1822)

Synonyms
- Pimelodus batasio Hamilton, 1822; Gagata batasio (Hamilton, 1822); Macrones batasio (Hamilton, 1822)

= Batasio batasio =

Species of catfish

Batasio batasio also known as Tista batasio is a species of catfish belonging to the family Bagridae. This species is native to South Asia, particularly in countries such as India, Bangladesh, and Nepal. It is a small catfish that inhabits rivers, streams, and other freshwater bodies.
