= Gagata pakistanica =

Scientific classification
- Kingdom: Animalia
- Phylum: Chordata
- Class: Actinopterygii
- Order: Siluriformes
- Family: Sisoridae
- Genus: Gagata
- Species: G. pakistanica

Binomial name
- Gagata pakistanica Mirza, Parveen & Javed, 1999

Species of fish

Gagata pakistanica is a species of sisorid catfish which is probably endemic to Pakistan.
