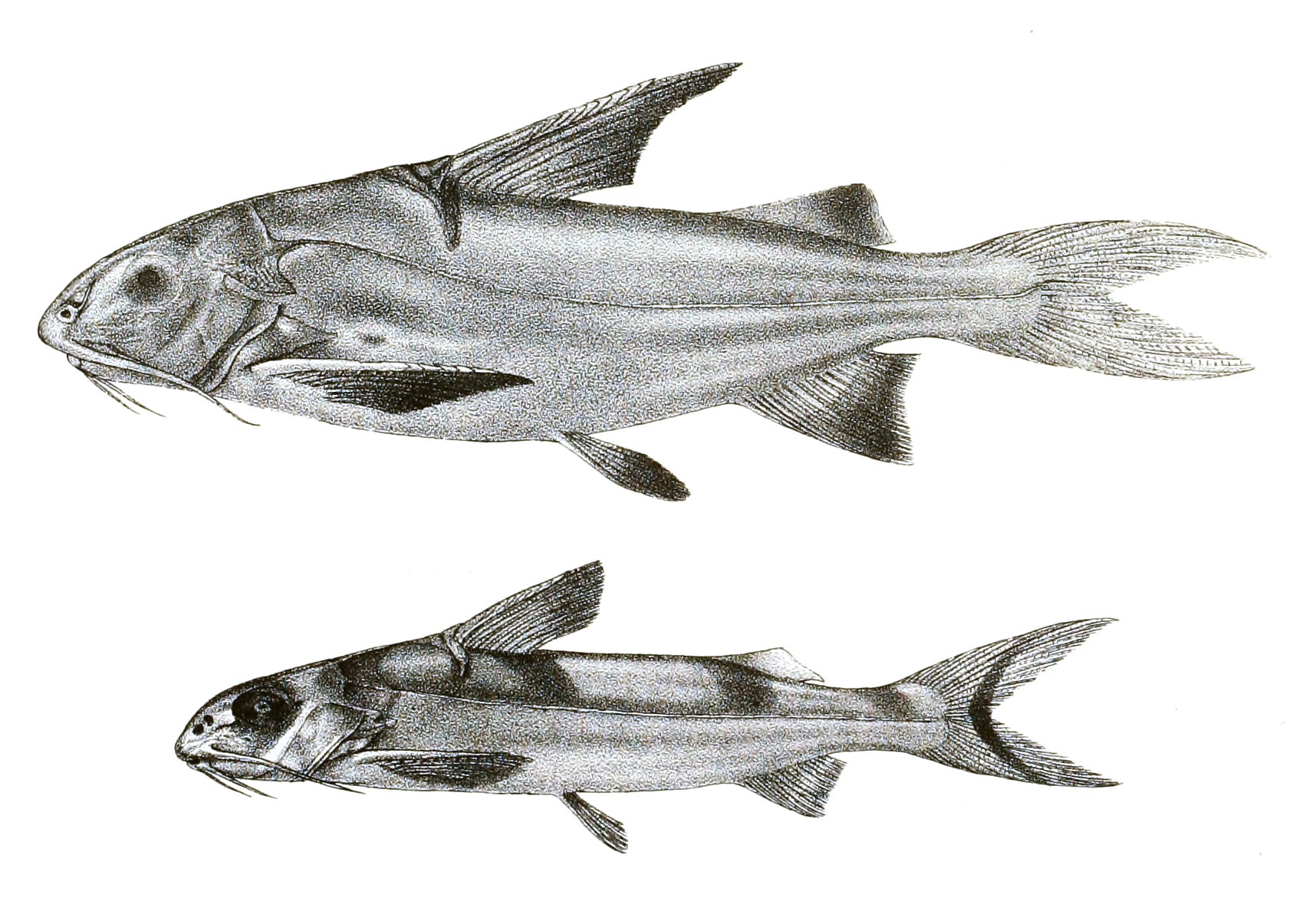

Conservation status
- Least Concern (IUCN 3.1)

Scientific classification
- Kingdom: Animalia
- Phylum: Chordata
- Class: Actinopterygii
- Order: Siluriformes
- Family: Sisoridae
- Genus: Gagata
- Species: G. cenia

Binomial name
- Gagata cenia (Hamilton, 1822)

= Gagata cenia =

Species of fish

Gagata cenia is a species of sisorid catfish found in the Ganges Delta and the Indus River. It has also been reported as occurring in Thailand and Burma. This species grows to a length of 15 centimetres (5.9 in) SL.
