= Psilorhynchus melissa =

Scientific classification
- Kingdom: Animalia
- Phylum: Chordata
- Class: Actinopterygii
- Order: Cypriniformes
- Family: Psilorhynchidae
- Genus: Psilorhynchus
- Species: P. melissa

Binomial name
- Psilorhynchus melissa Conway & Kottelat, 2010

Species of fish

Psilorhynchus melissa is a freshwater ray-finned fish, from the headwaters of Ann Chaung drainage in Myanmar. This species reaches a length of 5.0 cm (2.0 in).
