= Gagata melanopterus =

Conservation status
- Least Concern (IUCN 3.1)

Scientific classification
- Kingdom: Animalia
- Phylum: Chordata
- Class: Actinopterygii
- Order: Siluriformes
- Family: Sisoridae
- Genus: Gagata
- Species: G. melanopterus

Binomial name
- Gagata melanopterus Roberts & Ferraris, 1998

Species of fish

Gagata melanopterus is a species of sisorid catfish endemic to Myanmar where it occurs in the Irrawaddy, Sittang and lower Salween River basins. This species grows to a length of 15.8 centimetres (6.2 in) SL.
