= Psilorhynchus gokkyi =

Scientific classification
- Domain: Eukaryota
- Kingdom: Animalia
- Phylum: Chordata
- Class: Actinopterygii
- Order: Cypriniformes
- Family: Psilorhynchidae
- Genus: Psilorhynchus
- Species: P. gokkyi

Binomial name
- Psilorhynchus gokkyi Conway & Britz, 2010

Species of fish

Psilorhynchus gokkyi is a freshwater ray-finned fish, from the Pani Chaung, Ayeyarwady River drainage in Myanmar. This species reaches a length of 5.6 cm (2.2 in).
