= Psilorhynchus pseudecheneis =

Conservation status
- Least Concern (IUCN 3.1)

Scientific classification
- Kingdom: Animalia
- Phylum: Chordata
- Class: Actinopterygii
- Order: Cypriniformes
- Family: Psilorhynchidae
- Genus: Psilorhynchus
- Species: P. pseudecheneis

Binomial name
- Psilorhynchus pseudecheneis Menon & A. K. Datta, 1964

Species of fish

Psilorhynchus pseudecheneis, also known as the Nepalese minnow or stone carp, is a species of freshwater ray-finned fish, a torrent minnow. it inhabits torrential streams and it is adapted to such a habitat by possessing am increased count of simple rays in the pectoral fins and in having transverse folds in the skin on its underside which allow it to cling to rocks in the swift current. It is found in eastern Nepal and has recently been recorded from India, it is a migratory species. The specific name pseudecheneis is a compound of the Greek pseudo meaning "false" and echeneis which means a "sucker fish", probably a reference to the fact that the torrent minnows use their pectoral fin rays to adhere to the substrate rather than having a suckermouth.
