= Psilorhynchus piperatus =

Scientific classification
- Kingdom: Animalia
- Phylum: Chordata
- Class: Actinopterygii
- Order: Cypriniformes
- Family: Psilorhynchidae
- Genus: Psilorhynchus
- Species: P. piperatus

Binomial name
- Psilorhynchus piperatus Conway & Britz, 2010

Species of fish

Psilorhynchus piperatus is a freshwater ray-finned fish, from the Man Chaung, Ayeyarwady River drainage in Myanmar. This species reaches a length of 4.8 cm (1.9 in).
