= Gagata sexualis =

Conservation status
- Least Concern (IUCN 3.1)

Scientific classification
- Domain: Eukaryota
- Kingdom: Animalia
- Phylum: Chordata
- Class: Actinopterygii
- Order: Siluriformes
- Family: Sisoridae
- Genus: Gagata
- Species: G. sexualis

Binomial name
- Gagata sexualis Tilak, 1970

Species of fish

Gagata sexualis is a species of sisorid catfish endemic to India. This species grows to a length of 6 centimetres (2.4 in) TL.
