= Psilorhynchus breviminor =

Conservation status
- Data Deficient (IUCN 3.1)

Scientific classification
- Kingdom: Animalia
- Phylum: Chordata
- Class: Actinopterygii
- Order: Cypriniformes
- Family: Psilorhynchidae
- Genus: Psilorhynchus
- Species: P. breviminor

Binomial name
- Psilorhynchus breviminor Conway & Mayden, 2008

Species of fish

Psilorhynchus breviminor is a freshwater ray-finned fish, a torrent minnow, in the genus Psilorhynchus. It is only known from the Ma Gawe River, close to the Kalaw-Thazi highway, near the state border between Mandalay and Shan near the village of Nampantet in Myanmar. It was collected from algal mats, where it seemed to be either resting or feedingin a cool, fast-flowing stream which had a bed made up of sand and gravel and a depth of 30 cm.
