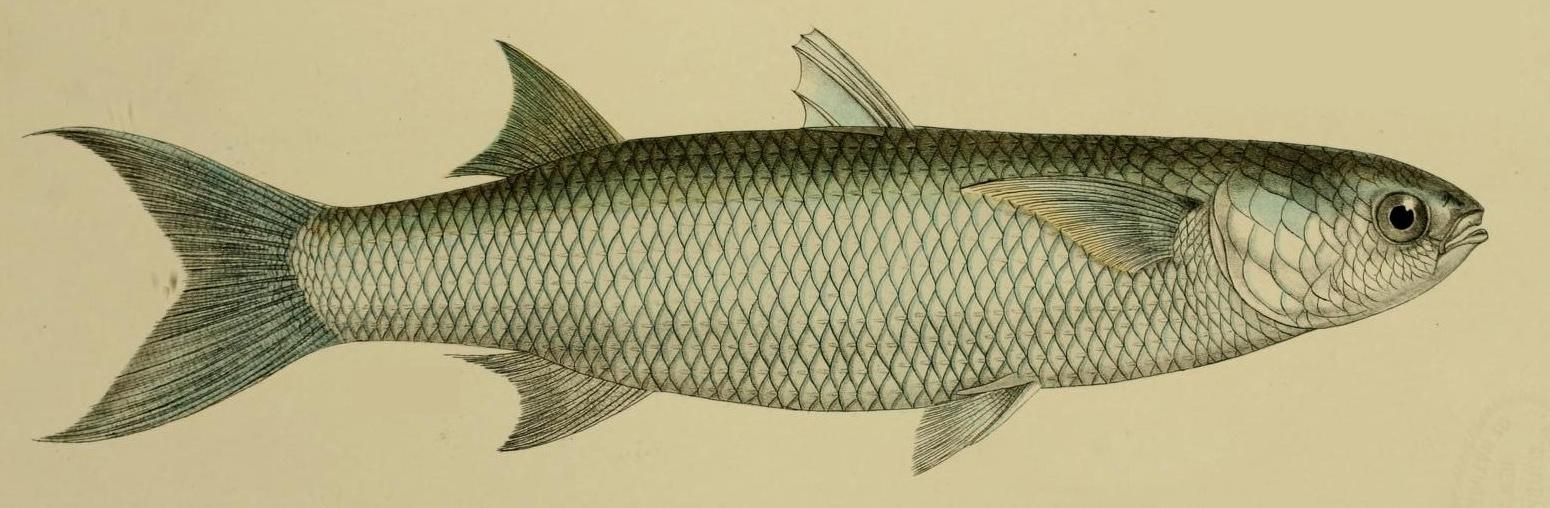

Conservation status
- Least Concern (IUCN 3.1)

Scientific classification
- Kingdom: Animalia
- Phylum: Chordata
- Class: Actinopterygii
- Division: Teleostei
- Order: Mugiliformes
- Family: Mugilidae
- Genus: Moolgarda
- Species: M. seheli

Binomial name
- Moolgarda seheli (Forsskål, 1775)

Synonyms
- Liza seheli (Forsskål, 1775); Crenimugil seheli (Forsskål, 1775); Mugil seheli (Forsskål, 1775); Valamugil seheli (Forsskål, 1775); Mugil caeruleomaculatus Lacépède, 1803; Mullus malabaricus Shaw, 1804; Mugil borbonicus Valenciennes, 1836; Mugil cylindricus Valenciennes, 1836; Mugil axillaris Valenciennes, 1836; Mugil decemradiatus Günther, 1861; Mugil bleekeri Günther, 1861; Mugil delicatus Alleyne & Macleay, 1877; Liza formosae Oshima, 1922; Valamugil formosae (Oshima, 1922); Crenimugil formosae (Oshima, 1922)

= Bluespot mullet =

Species of ray-finned fish

The bluespot mullet (Moolgarda seheli) is a member of the ray-finned fish family Mugilidae found worldwide in coastal temperate and tropical waters, and in some species in fresh water. Bluespot mullet have served as an important source of food in South East Asia.
