= Psilorhynchus tenura =

Conservation status
- Critically Endangered (IUCN 3.1)

Scientific classification
- Kingdom: Animalia
- Phylum: Chordata
- Class: Actinopterygii
- Order: Cypriniformes
- Family: Psilorhynchidae
- Genus: Psilorhynchus
- Species: P. tenura

Binomial name
- Psilorhynchus tenura Arunachalam, Muralidharan, 2008

Species of fish

Psilorhynchus tenura is a critically endangered fish found in genus Psilorhynchus. It is endemic to the Western Ghats of Karnataka, India, where it is restricted to two locations on the Tunga River near Sringeri and also at Korkanhalla inside Kudremukh National Park in Karnataka. It is found in streams and rivers with beds made up of sand, pebbles and gravel.
