= Psilorhynchus microphthalmus =

Conservation status
- Endangered (IUCN 3.1)

Scientific classification
- Kingdom: Animalia
- Phylum: Chordata
- Class: Actinopterygii
- Order: Cypriniformes
- Family: Psilorhynchidae
- Genus: Psilorhynchus
- Species: P. microphthalmus

Binomial name
- Psilorhynchus microphthalmus Vishwanath & Manojkumar, 1995

Species of fish

Psilorhynchus microphthalmus is a freshwater ray-finned fish, a torrent minnow. It is restricted to the Chapki Stream in the Chindwin basin of Manipur, India. It is found in flowing water with a rock substrate. This species is threatened from the effects of the use of poisons and explosives for fishing and the sedimentation of its habitat caused by deforestation and slash and burn agriculture.
