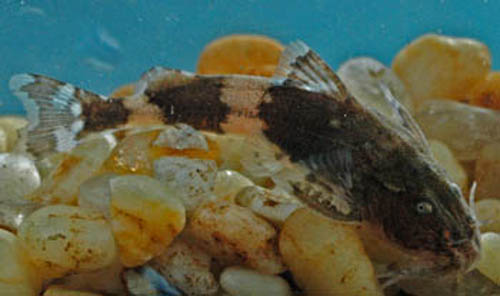
- Batasio fasciolatus

Scientific classification
- Kingdom: Animalia
- Phylum: Chordata
- Class: Actinopterygii
- Order: Siluriformes
- Family: Bagridae
- Genus: Batasio; Blyth, 1860

Type species
- Pimelodus batasio F. Hamilton, 1822

= Batasio =

Genus of fishes

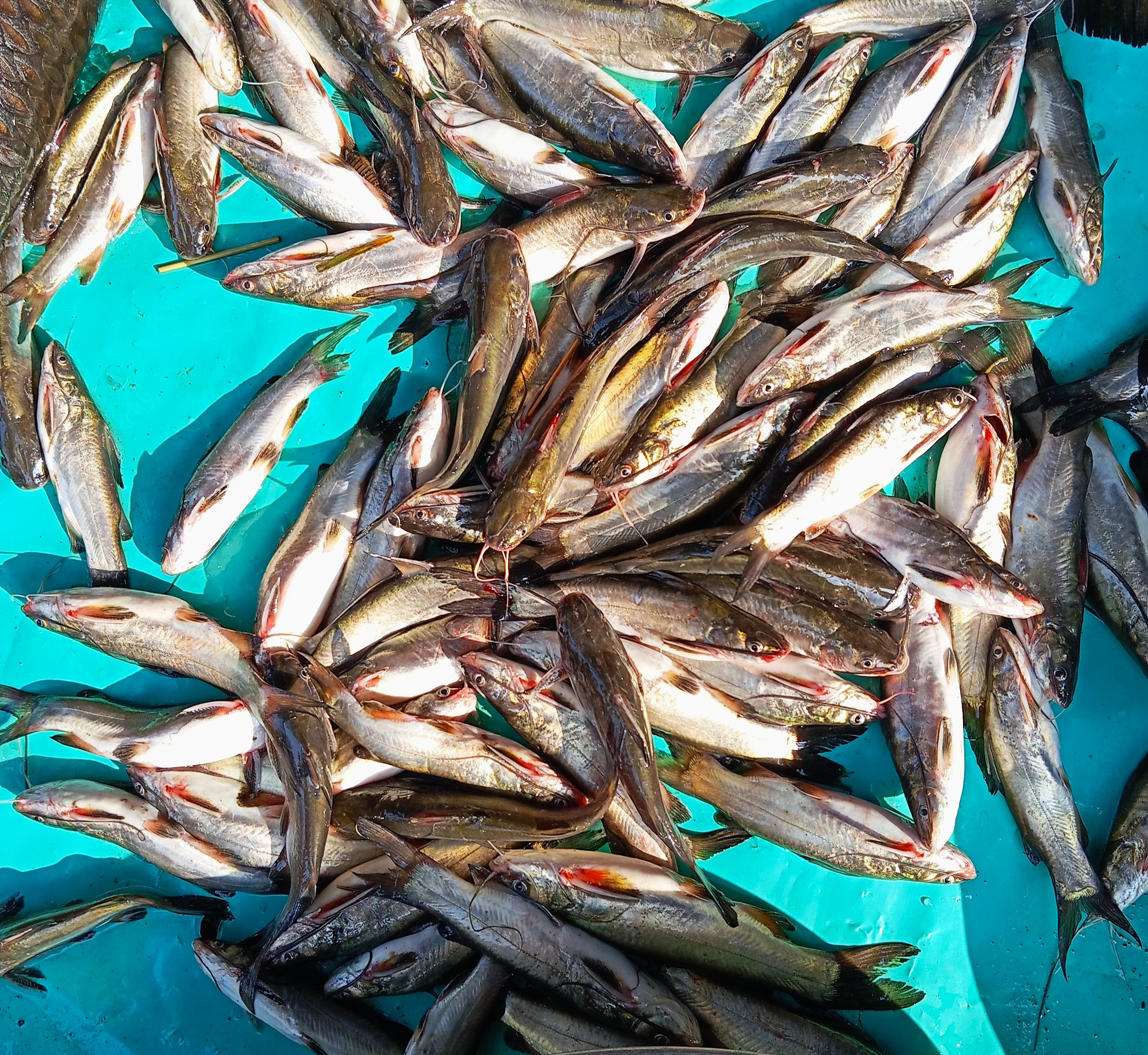
Batasio for sale in Kolkata market, West Bengal, India.

Batasio is a genus of catfish of the family Bagridae. These small fish are found in fast-flowing hillstreams throughout South and mainland Southeast Asia.

== Taxonomy ==
Batasio was first described by Edward Blyth in 1860 with Batasio buchanani (a needless renaming of Batasio batasio) designated as type. B. pakistanicus, described in 1989, is tentatively placed in Batasio, but its generic placement is questionable.

== Species ==
There are currently 18 recognized species in this genus:

- Batasio affinis Blyth, 1860
- Batasio batasio (F. Hamilton, 1822)
- Batasio convexirostrum Darshan, Anganthoibi & Vishwanath, 2011
- Batasio dayi (Vinciguerra, 1890)
- Batasio elongatus H. H. Ng, 2004
- Batasio fasciolatus H. H. Ng, 2006
- Batasio feruminatus H. H. Ng & Kottelat, 2008
- Batasio flavus Plamoottil, 2015
- Batasio fluviatilis (F. Day, 1888)
- Batasio macronotus H. H. Ng & Edds, 2004
- Batasio merianiensis (B. L. Chaudhuri, 1913)
- Batasio pakistanicus Mirza & M. A. Jan, 1989
- Batasio procerus H. H. Ng, 2008
- Batasio sharavatiensis Bhatt & Jayaram, 2004
- Batasio spilurus H. H. Ng, 2006
- Batasio tengana (F. Hamilton, 1822)
- Batasio tigrinus H. H. Ng & Kottelat, 2001
- Batasio travancoria Hora & Law, 1941

== Distribution ==
Batasio species are generally found throughout South and mainland Southeast Asia. B. affinis is found in Myanmar. B. fluviatilis is found in Northern Malay Peninsula. B. tigrinus is also recorded from Thailand. B. dayi originates from the Salween and Irrawaddy River drainages in Myanmar. B. elongatus is found in southwestern Myanmar. B. macronotus originates from eastern Nepal. B. pakistanicus is found in the Indus River. B. batasio also originates from northern India where it shares its habitat with Mystus vittatus. B. fasciolatus is known from the Tista River drainage, a tributary of the Brahmaputra River. B. merianiensis is found in the Brahmaputra River drainage. B. sharavatiensis originates from the Sharavati River in Uttara Kannada, Karnataka. B. spilurus is known from the Brahmaputra River drainage in the vicinity of Dibrugarh. B. tengana is known from the Ganges and the Brahmaputra River drainages; it is apparently restricted to upper reaches of larger rivers. B. travancoria is distributed in the Chittar, Kallada and Pamba Rivers in southern Kerala and is considered a rare species.

== Appearance and anatomy ==
Batasio species typically have enlarged sensory pores on their head, laterally compressed heads and bodies, and at least 35 vertebrae. B. tengana, B. pakistanicus and B. spilurus differ from other Batasio species in that their adipose fin is much shorter. These fish are small catfish. B. pakistanicus and B. spilurus are the smallest species, reaching only 35 millimetres (1.4 in) SL and 45 mm (1.8 in) SL respectively. The other species range from 55–101 mm (2.2–4.0 in) SL.

B. affinis, B. dayi, and B. fluviatilis have bars or bands, spots or stripes, and are not plain-bodied. B. pakistanicus has a black humeral spot with a dark streak on the dorsum. B. batasio has a dark stripe along the lateral line and another above. B. batasio does not exceed 10 centimetres (4 in). B. fasciolatus and B. tigrinus are the only Batasio species in which the adult colouration consists of five or six vertical dark brown bars on a light brown body. B. tengana has bands descending from the dorsal surface to the lateral line. B. travancoria has a lateral stripe along the lateral line and a faint shoulder spot. B. sharavatiensis is the only Batasio that has a completely plain and colourless body; its adipose fin is almost confluent (continuous) with the caudal fin save for a small notch.

Batasio, like most other bagrids, are easy to sex. The male has a visible genital papilla just fore of the anal fin. Gravid female B. tengana (South East Asian form) are easy to identify because the pink eggs can be seen through their semi-transparent belly when they swim near light.

== Ecology ==
Batasio species generally are found in fast-flowing hillstreams. B. fluviatilis is found in rivers and streams with moderate to swift current and a predominantly rocky bottom, and is less often in slow-flowing streams with a muddy substrate. B. tengana occurs in rivers and canals and is found in torrential streams. B. travancoria occurs in hillstreams and rivers at the bases of hills. B. fluviatilis hide among stones or submerged vegetation during the day and come out at night to feed. B. batasio appears to mimic Mystus vittatus, with which it inhabits the same habitat.

== In the aquarium ==
B. tengana, though uncommon, is the most commonly encountered species of Batasio in the aquarium hobby. B. tengana does well in captivity, and has been bred in captivity. The fish spawned in soft neutral water, but raising the fry, of which there were over 200, proved difficult. The temperature for the Indian species should remain between 20–22 °C (68–72 °F); the Southeast Asian Batasio will tolerate slightly warmer waters. It appears that all Batasio need a lot of current and a high oxygen content.

B. batasio is another species in the hobby, but can be easily confused with Mystus vittatus. B. travancoria has only once been imported to the U.S. In captivity, the experience of one aquarist is that specimens of B. travancoria show little interest in all foods offered and slowly lose weight over a span of a few months and perish.
