= Erethistes maesotensis =

Scientific classification
- Kingdom: Animalia
- Phylum: Chordata
- Class: Actinopterygii
- Order: Siluriformes
- Family: Sisoridae
- Genus: Erethistes
- Species: E. maesotensis

Binomial name
- Erethistes maesotensis Kottelat, 1983

Species of fish

Erethistes maesotensis is a species of South Asian river catfish native to Myanmar and Thailand where it is known from Moei River near Mae Sot on the Thai-Burmese border. E. maesotensis has been observed to inhabit fast-moving waters; during the rainy season, the water depth can increase by at least 3 metres (10 ft). The substrate mainly consists of small stones and sand with numerous empty gastropod shells. This species grows to a length of 5.2 centimetres (2.0 in) SL.
