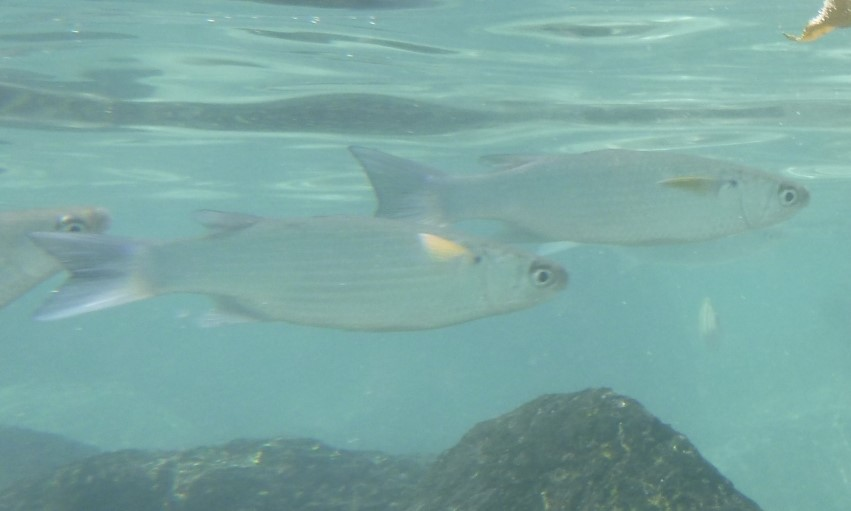

Conservation status
- Least Concern (IUCN 3.1)

Scientific classification
- Kingdom: Animalia
- Phylum: Chordata
- Class: Actinopterygii
- Division: Teleostei
- Order: Mugiliformes
- Family: Mugilidae
- Genus: Moolgarda
- Species: M. heterocheilos

Binomial name
- Moolgarda heterocheilos {Bleeker, 1855)

Synonyms
- Mugil heterocheilos Bleeker, 1855; Crenimugil heterocheilos (Bleeker, 1855); Crenimugil heterocheilus (Bleeker, 1855); Mugil heterochilus Bleeker, 1855; Mugil papillosus Macleay, 1883; Mugil banksi Seale, 1910

= Moolgarda heterocheilos =

Species of ray-finned fish

Moolgarda heterocheilos, the half fringelip mullet, is a species of ray-finned fish in the family Mugilidae. It is found throughout the Indo-Pacific Ocean.

== Description ==
Moolgarda heterocheilos can reach a standard length of 50.0 centimetres (19.7 in).
