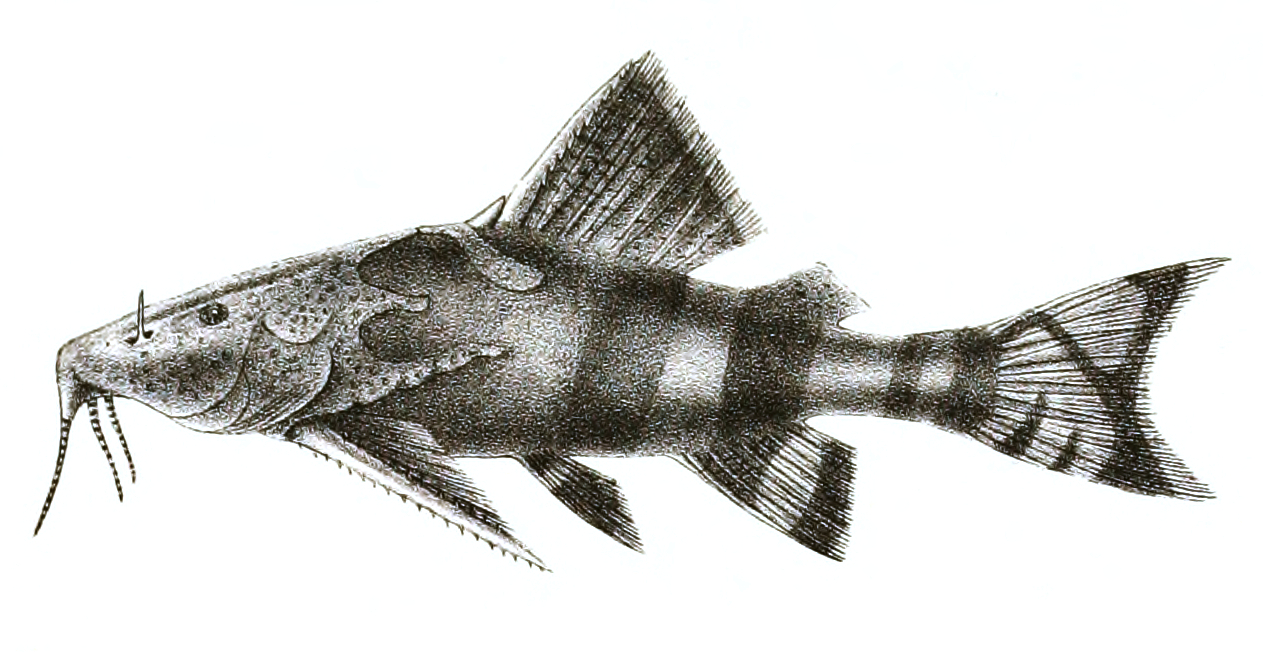

Conservation status
- Least Concern (IUCN 3.1)

Scientific classification
- Kingdom: Animalia
- Phylum: Chordata
- Class: Actinopterygii
- Order: Siluriformes
- Family: Sisoridae
- Genus: Hara
- Species: H. hara

Binomial name
- Hara hara (F. Hamilton, 1822)

Synonyms
- Pimelodus hara Hamilton, 1822; Erethistes hara (Hamilton, 1822); Pimelodus asperus McClelland, 1844; Glyptothorax asperus (McClelland, 1844); Laguvia asperus (McClelland, 1844); Hara buchanani Blyth, 1860; Hara saharsai Datta Munshi & Srivastava, 1988; Erethistes serratus (Vishwanath & Kosygin, 2000); Hara serrata Vishwanath & Kosygin, 2000

= Hara hara =

Species of fish

Hara hara is a species of South Asian river catfish that occurs in Bangladesh, China, India, Myanmar and Nepal. This species grows to a length of 13.0 centimetres (5.1 in) TL.
