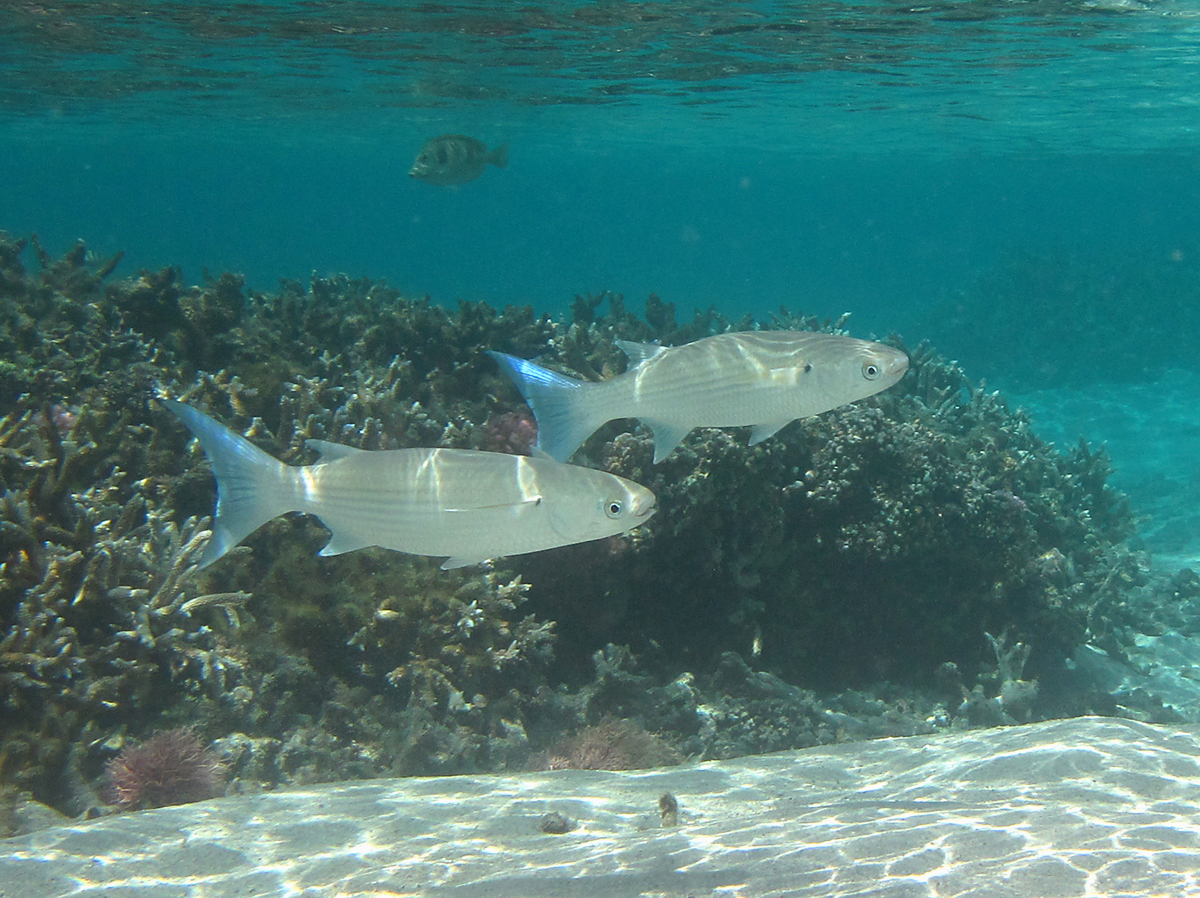

Conservation status
- Least Concern (IUCN 3.1)

Scientific classification
- Kingdom: Animalia
- Phylum: Chordata
- Class: Actinopterygii
- Division: Teleostei
- Order: Mugiliformes
- Family: Mugilidae
- Genus: Moolgarda
- Species: M. crenilabis

Binomial name
- Moolgarda crenilabis (Forsskål, 1775)

Synonyms
- Mugil crenilabis Forsskål, 1775; Chelon crenilabis (Forsskål, 1775); Liza crenilabis (Forsskål, 1775); Querimana crenilabis (Forsskål, 1775); Crenimugil crenilabis (Forsskål, 1775); Crenimugli crenilabris (Forsskål, 1775); Mugil crenilabris Forsskål, 1775; Mugil cirrhostomus J. R. Forster, 1801; Oedalechilus cirrhostomus (Forster, 1801); Mugil fasciatus Valenciennes, 1836; Mugil lauvergnii Eydoux & Souleyet, 1850; Liza lauvergnii (Eydoux & Souleyet, 1850); Mugil macrocheilos Bleeker, 1854; Mugil macrocheilus Bleeker, 1854; Mugil rueppellii Günther, 1861; Mugil ruppellii Günther, 1861; Mugil neocalidonicus Castelnau, 1873; Mugil neocaledonicus Castelnau, 1873

= Moolgarda crenilabis =

Fringelip mullet

Species of ray-finned fish

Moolgarda crenilabis, the fringelip mullet, is a member of ray-finned fish in the family Mugilidae. It is found throughout the Indo-Pacific Ocean.

== Description ==
Moolgarda crenilabis can reach a standard length of 60.0 centimetres (23.6 in).
