= Batasio tigrinus =

Conservation status
- Data Deficient (IUCN 3.1)

Scientific classification
- Kingdom: Animalia
- Phylum: Chordata
- Class: Actinopterygii
- Order: Siluriformes
- Family: Bagridae
- Genus: Batasio
- Species: B. tigrinus

Binomial name
- Batasio tigrinus Ng & Kottelat, 2001

Species of catfish

Batasio tigrinus is a species of catfish (order Siluriformes) of the genus Batasio in the family Bagridae, known from Thailand. It is found in the hillstreams of Mae Klong and it was described from Khwae Noi River, one of the main tributaries of Mae Klong; its habitat is sandy/rocky substrate. It is sporadically collected as an ornamental fish; the threats are not well known but may be human disturbance and siltation.
