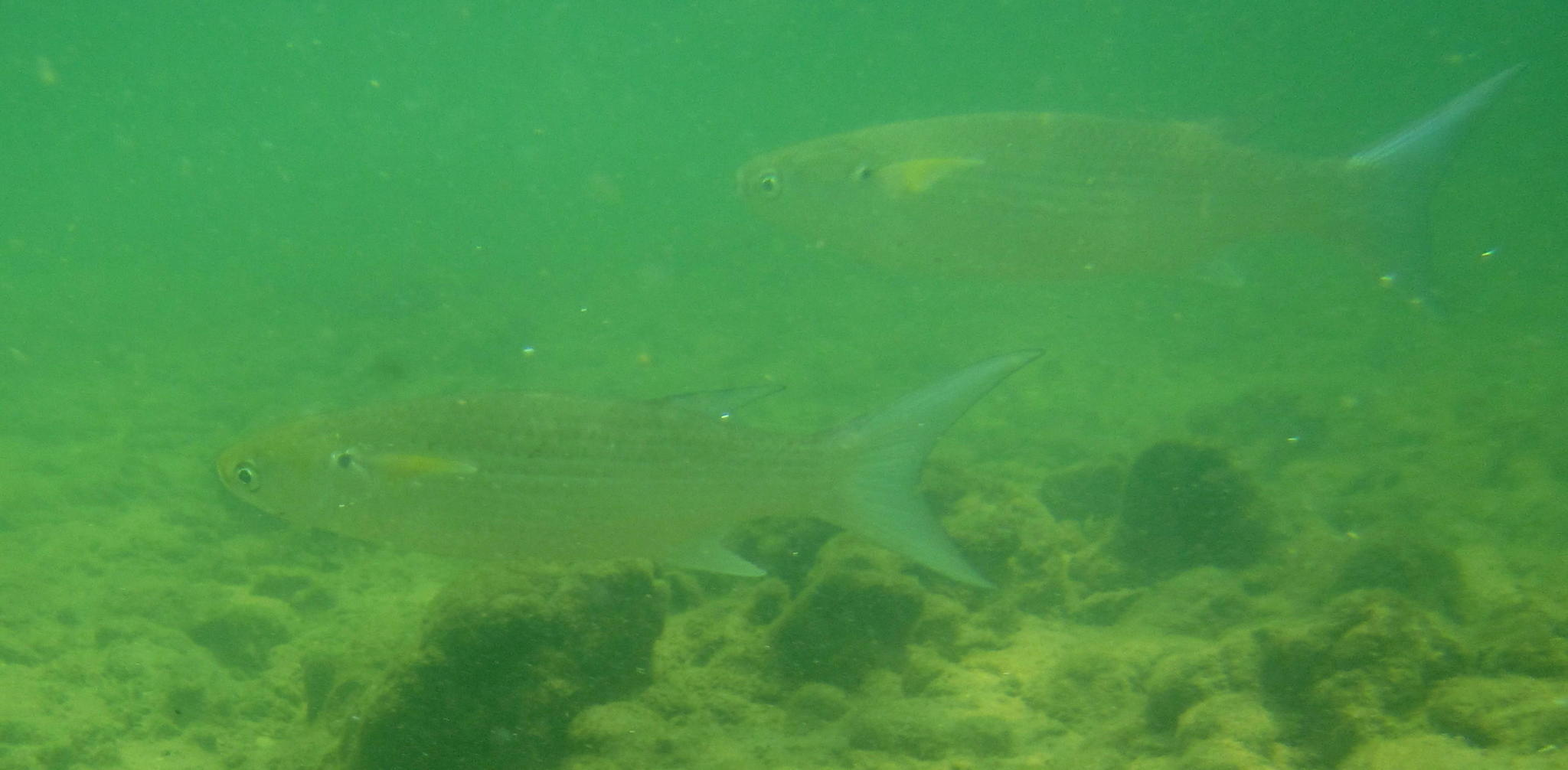

Scientific classification
- Domain: Eukaryota
- Kingdom: Animalia
- Phylum: Chordata
- Class: Actinopterygii
- Order: Mugiliformes
- Family: Mugilidae
- Genus: Crenimugil
- Species: C. buchanani

Binomial name
- Crenimugil buchanani (Bleeker, 1853)

Synonyms
- Mugil buchanani Bleeker, 1853; Moolgarda buchanani (Bleeker, 1853); Valamugil buchanani (Bleeker, 1853); Valamugil buchanari (Bleeker, 1853); Mugil ceylonensis Günther, 1861; Oedalechilus kesteveni Whitley, 1943

= Crenimugil buchanani =

Species of ray-finned fish

Crenimugil buchanani, the bluetail mullet, is a species of ray-finned fish in the family Mugilidae. It is found throughout the Indo-Pacific Ocean.

== Description ==
Crenimugil buchanani can reach a total length of 100.0 centimetres (39.4 in).

== Etymology ==
The mullet is named in honour of Francis Hamilton-Buchanan (1762-1829), a Scottish physician and naturalist.
