= Hara horai =

Conservation status
- Least Concern (IUCN 3.1)

Scientific classification
- Domain: Eukaryota
- Kingdom: Animalia
- Phylum: Chordata
- Class: Actinopterygii
- Order: Siluriformes
- Family: Erethistidae
- Genus: Hara
- Species: H. horai

Binomial name
- Hara horai Misra, 1976

Species of fish

Hara horai is a species of South Asian river catfish endemic to West Bengal, India where it is found in the Terai and Duars in the middle and upper Brahmaputra River drainage. This species grows to a length of 8 centimetres (3.1 in) TL.
