= Psilorhynchus amplicephalus =

Conservation status
- Data Deficient (IUCN 3.1)

Scientific classification
- Kingdom: Animalia
- Phylum: Chordata
- Class: Actinopterygii
- Order: Cypriniformes
- Family: Psilorhynchidae
- Genus: Psilorhynchus
- Species: P. amplicephalus

Binomial name
- Psilorhynchus amplicephalus Arunachalam, Muralidharan & Sivakumar, 2007

Species of fish

Psilorhynchus amplicephalus is a freshwater ray-finned fish, from the Balishwar river in Assam, India. It can be found in rivers with a stronger current and sandy substrate, it prefers a sandy substrate with the horizontally placed pectoral fin suited to allow the fish to resist the current.
