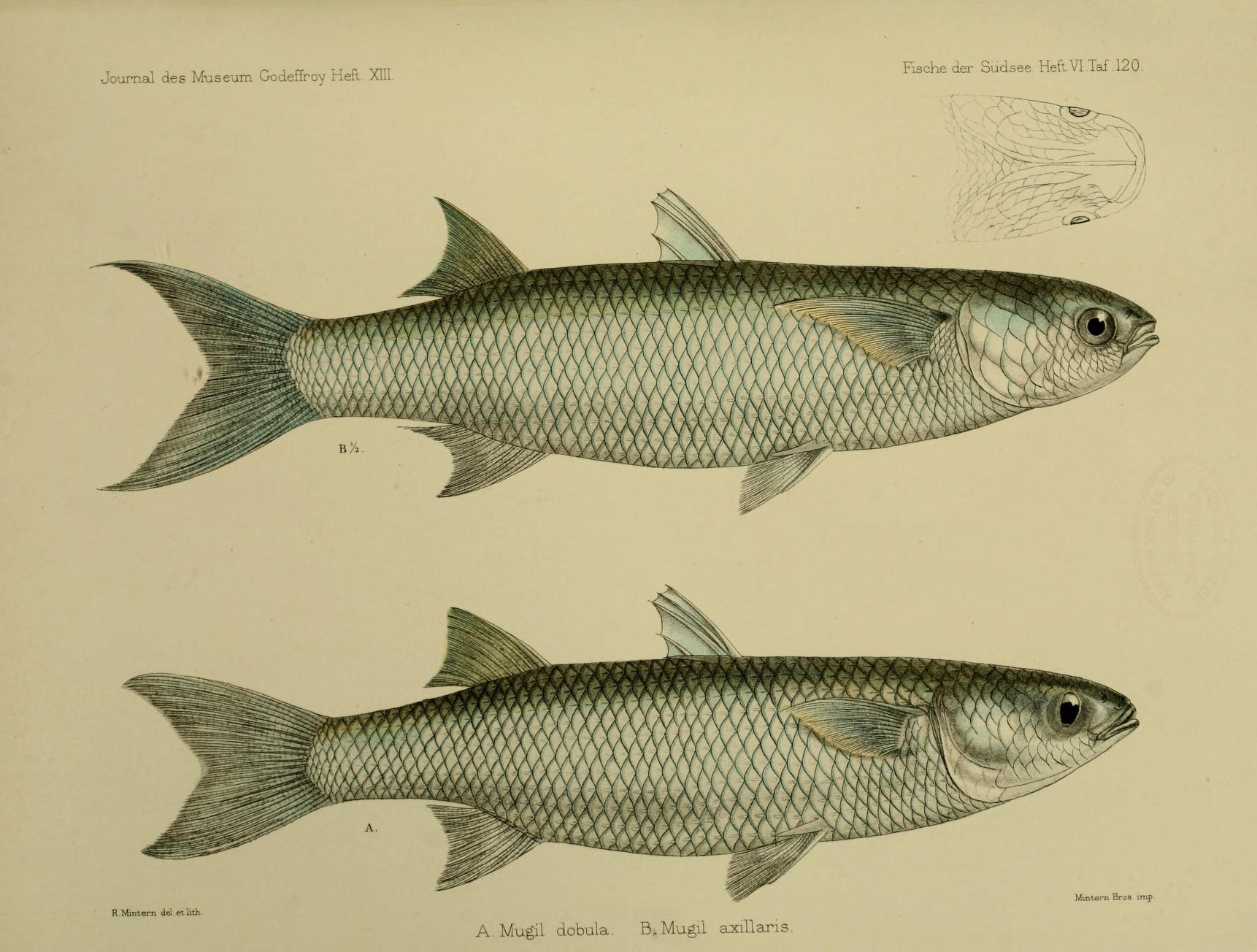

Scientific classification
- Kingdom: Animalia
- Phylum: Chordata
- Class: Actinopterygii
- Division: Teleostei
- Order: Mugiliformes
- Family: Mugilidae
- Genus: Moolgarda; Whitley, 1945

Type species
- Moolgarda pura

Synonyms
- Crenimugil Schultz, 1946; Paracrenimugil Senou, 1988; Valamugil Smith, 1948

= Moolgarda =

Genus of fishes

Moolgarda is a genus of mugilid mullets found in coastal waters of the Indo-Pacific, including estuaries and rivers.

The genus has had a difficult and complicated history. The genus has been considered as a nomen dubium in the past, which has led to complications with its priority over Crenimugil and Valamugil. Whitley considered the thinlip mullet the closest relative of Moolgarda pura. This article follows the most recent work (Bogorodsky et al., 2024).

== Species ==
The current species in the genus are:

- Moolgarda cirrhostoma (Forster in Bloch & Schneider, 1801) incertae sedis
- Moolgarda crenilabis (Forsskål, 1775) (Fringelip mullet)
- Moolgarda cunnesius (Valenciennes, 1836) (Longarm mullet)
- Moolgarda delicata (Alleyne & Macleay, 1877)
- Moolgarda heterocheilos (Bleeker, 1855) (Half fringelip mullet)
- Moolgarda seheli (Forsskål, 1775) (Bluespot mullet)
- Moolgarda tade (Fabricius, 1775)

Synonyms

- Moolgarda buchanani (Bleeker, 1853); valid as M. tade
- Moolgarda malabarica (Shaw, 1804); valid as M. tade
- Moolgarda pedaraki (Valenciennes, 1836); valid as M. tade
- Moolgarda pura Whitley, 1945; valid as M. seheli
