= Psilorhynchus homaloptera =

Conservation status
- Least Concern (IUCN 3.1)

Scientific classification
- Kingdom: Animalia
- Phylum: Chordata
- Class: Actinopterygii
- Order: Cypriniformes
- Family: Psilorhynchidae
- Genus: Psilorhynchus
- Species: P. homaloptera

Binomial name
- Psilorhynchus homaloptera Hora & Mukerji, 1935

Species of fish

Psilorhynchus homaloptera or torrent stone carp is a fish found in genus Psilorhynchus. It is found in India, Myanmar, China and Nepal. It's standard length is 9.4 centimeters.
