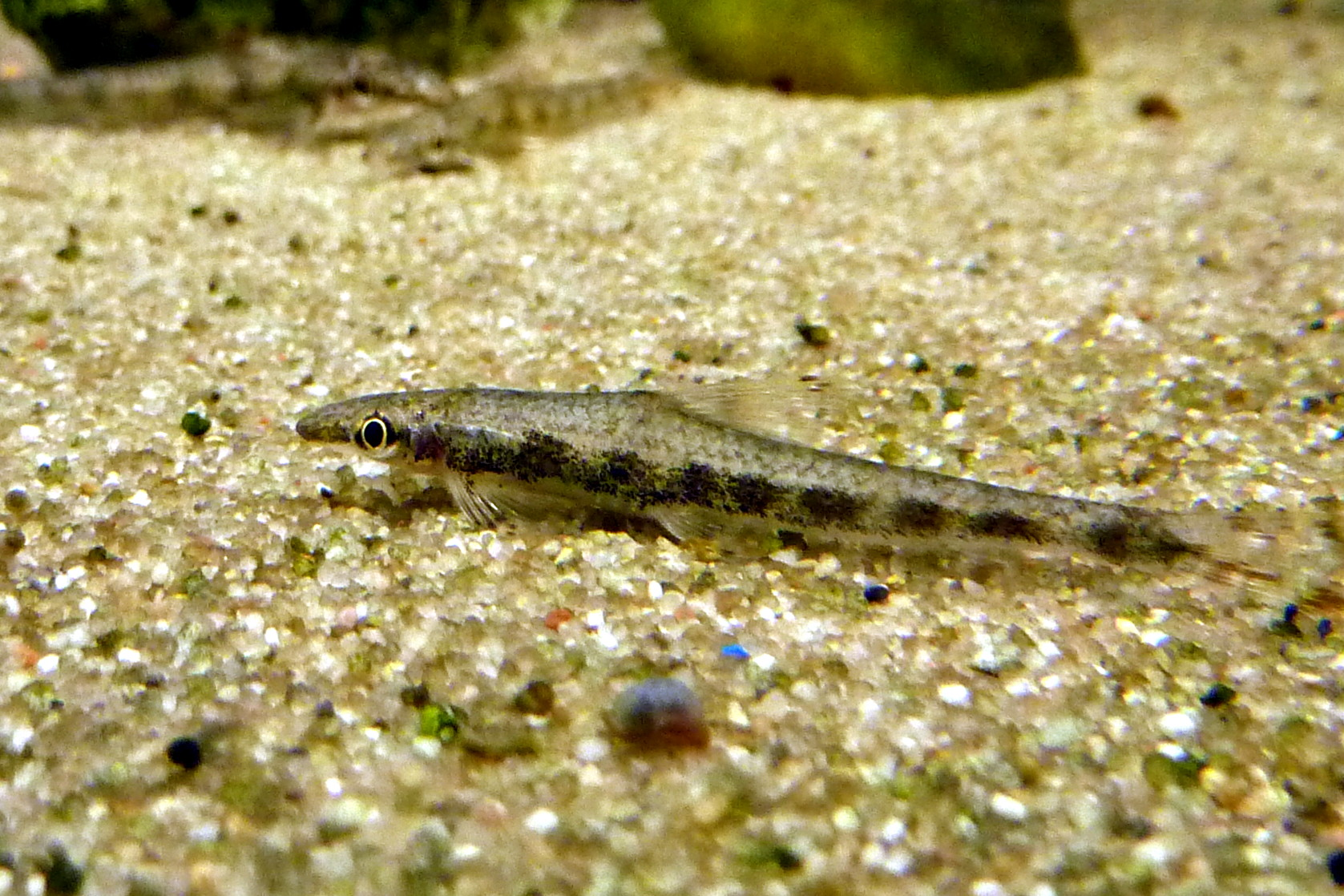

Conservation status
- Least Concern (IUCN 3.1)

Scientific classification
- Kingdom: Animalia
- Phylum: Chordata
- Class: Actinopterygii
- Order: Cypriniformes
- Family: Psilorhynchidae
- Genus: Psilorhynchus
- Species: P. sucatio

Binomial name
- Psilorhynchus sucatio (Hamilton, 1822)

Synonyms
- Cyprinus sucatio Hamilton, 1822

= Psilorhynchus sucatio =

Species of fish

Psilorhynchus sucatio, the river stone carp or sucatio minnow, is freshwater ray-finned fish a species of torrent minnow. The specific name is a latinization of one of the local names for this species, sukati. It is a widely distributed species, which is found in Nepal and Bangladesh, as well as the Indian states of Arunachal Pradesh, Assam, Bihar, Manipur, Meghalaya, Nagaland, Uttar Pradesh and West Bengal. P. sucatio occurs in water with a fast current, and prefers the edges of sandy streams. In the lowlands, it is abundant near emergent or overhanging vegetation. This species is an altitudinal migrant. At a maximum length of 5 cm, it is too small to be of any interest to fisheries but it is collected for the aquarium trade. It is the type species of the genus Psilorhynchus.
