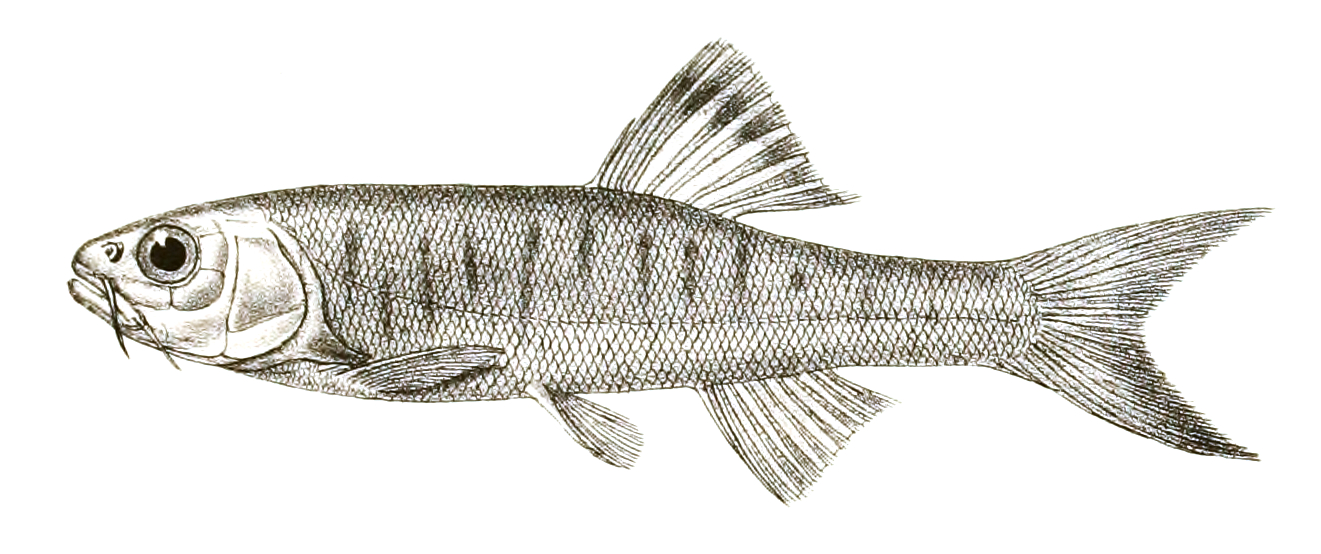

Conservation status
- Least Concern (IUCN 3.1)

Scientific classification
- Kingdom: Animalia
- Phylum: Chordata
- Class: Actinopterygii
- Order: Cypriniformes
- Family: Danionidae
- Genus: Barilius
- Species: B. shacra

Binomial name
- Barilius shacra (F. Hamilton, 1822)

= Barilius shacra =

Species of fish

Barilius shacra is a fish in genus Barilius of the family Cyprinidae.

== Biology ==
The Barilius shacra is not recorded to be in any threat to become an endangered species and is considered to be the least concern.

== Size ==
The average length of Barilius shacra is about 100 – 130 mm.

== Feeding ==
The Barilius shacra is considered to be a surface-feeder who preys on insects that fly and other small fishes and benthic invertebrates. When this species is kept in an aquarium, they are not picky about what they eat and will accept most food given to them.

== Location ==
The Barilius shacra is found in the following freshwater areas:

- Kosi/Koshi River
- Ganges River
- Himalayas
- Nepal
- Padma River
- Bangladesh
