= Psilorhynchus hamiltoni =

Scientific classification
- Kingdom: Animalia
- Phylum: Chordata
- Class: Actinopterygii
- Order: Cypriniformes
- Family: Psilorhynchidae
- Genus: Psilorhynchus
- Species: P. hamiltoni

Binomial name
- Psilorhynchus hamiltoni Conway, Dittmer, Jezisek & H.H. Ng, 2013

Species of fish

Psilorhynchus hamiltoni is a species of freshwater ray-finned fish. It is found in the Tista River in West Bengal, India.

== Description ==
Psilorhynchus hamiltoni reaches a standard length of 3.1 cm (1.2 in).

== Etymology ==
The fish is named in honour of Francis Buchanan-Hamilton.
