= Psilorhynchus pavimentatus =

Scientific classification
- Domain: Eukaryota
- Kingdom: Animalia
- Phylum: Chordata
- Class: Actinopterygii
- Order: Cypriniformes
- Family: Psilorhynchidae
- Genus: Psilorhynchus
- Species: P. pavimentatus

Binomial name
- Psilorhynchus pavimentatus Conway & Kottelat, 2010

Species of fish

Psilorhynchus pavimentatus is a species of freshwater ray-finned fish, from the headwaters of Ann Chaung drainage in Myanmar. This species reaches a length of 5.0 cm (2.0 in).
