= Psilorhynchus arunachalensis =

Conservation status
- Data Deficient (IUCN 3.1)

Scientific classification
- Kingdom: Animalia
- Phylum: Chordata
- Class: Actinopterygii
- Order: Cypriniformes
- Family: Psilorhynchidae
- Genus: Psilorhynchus
- Species: P. arunachalensis

Binomial name
- Psilorhynchus arunachalensis (Nebeshwar Sharma, Bagra & D. N. Das, 2007)

Synonyms
- Psilorhynchoides arunachalensis Nebeshwar, Bagra & Das, 2007

Species of fish

Psilorhynchus arunachalensis is a species of torrent minnow. It is a freshwater benthopelagic fish and which is found in Arunachal Pradesh.
