= Psilorhynchus olliei =

Scientific classification
- Domain: Eukaryota
- Kingdom: Animalia
- Phylum: Chordata
- Class: Actinopterygii
- Order: Cypriniformes
- Family: Psilorhynchidae
- Genus: Psilorhynchus
- Species: P. olliei

Binomial name
- Psilorhynchus olliei Conway & Britz, 2015

Species of fish

Psilorhynchus olliei is a freshwater ray-finned fish, from Kyari Chaung, Ayeyarwady drainage in Myanmar. This species reaches a length of 5.4 cm (2.1 in).

The fish is named in honor of friend and colleague Oliver (Ollie) Crimmen (b. 1954), the fish curator at the Natural History Museum in London, for his help and company during a number of recent field trips to Myanmar.
