= Psilorhynchus rahmani =

Conservation status
- Data Deficient (IUCN 3.1)

Scientific classification
- Domain: Eukaryota
- Kingdom: Animalia
- Phylum: Chordata
- Class: Actinopterygii
- Order: Cypriniformes
- Family: Psilorhynchidae
- Genus: Psilorhynchus
- Species: P. rahmani

Binomial name
- Psilorhynchus rahmani Conway & Mayden, 2008

Species of fish

Psilorhynchus rahmani is a freshwater ray-finned fish a torrent minnow which is found in a small, well oxygenated hill stream near Chittagong University in Hathazari Upazila in the Chittagong Division of Bangladesh. The specific name honours A. K. Ataur Rahman of the Department of Fisheries in Dhaka, for his contribution to the ichthyology of Bangladesh.
