= Psilorhynchus brachyrhynchus =

Scientific classification
- Domain: Eukaryota
- Kingdom: Animalia
- Phylum: Chordata
- Class: Actinopterygii
- Order: Cypriniformes
- Family: Psilorhynchidae
- Genus: Psilorhynchus
- Species: P. brachyrhynchus

Binomial name
- Psilorhynchus brachyrhynchus Conway & Britz, 2010

Species of fish

Psilorhynchus brachyrhynchus is a freshwater ray-finned fish, from the upper Ayeyarwady River drainage in northern Myanmar. This species reaches a length of 5.1 cm (2.0 in).
