= Gagata gagata =

Conservation status
- Least Concern (IUCN 3.1)

Scientific classification
- Kingdom: Animalia
- Phylum: Chordata
- Class: Actinopterygii
- Order: Siluriformes
- Family: Sisoridae
- Genus: Gagata
- Species: G. gagata

Binomial name
- Gagata gagata (Hamilton, 1822)

Synonyms
- Pimelodus gagata Hamilton, 1822; Gagata typus Bleeker, 1863

Species of catfish

Gagata gagata is a species of sisorid catfish found in Bangladesh, Myanmar and India. This species grows to a length of 30.5 centimetres (12.0 in) TL. It is native to Asia, found in India, Bangladesh and Burma.
