= Fishing industry in Bangladesh =

Overview of fishing in Bangladesh

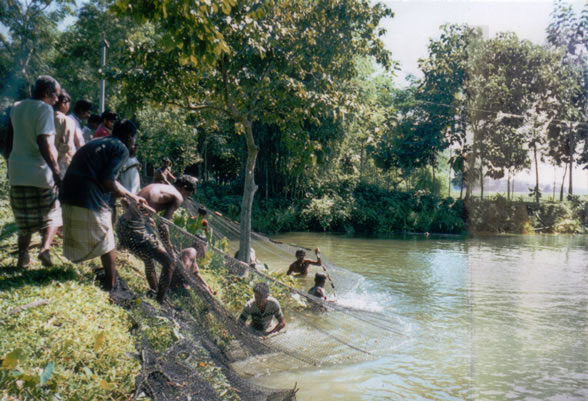
Villagers fishing in Sylhet, Bangladesh

Bangladesh being a first line littoral state of the Indian Ocean has many marine resources in the Bay of Bengal. The country has an exclusive economic zone of 41,000 square miles (110,000 km^{2}) which totals 73% of the country's land area. In the past, people of Bangladesh were mostly dependent upon land-based proteins. But continuous process of industrialization and urbanization consumed the limited land area, leading the vast under water protein available from the Bay of Bengal, the only way to meet Bangladesh's nutritional needs.

Fish provides about 60 percent of the animal protein in the Bangladeshi diet. According to the Bangladesh Department of Fisheries, aquaculture contributed about 2.53 percent of the country's national GDP and roughly 22 percent of its agricultural GDP in the 2023–24 fiscal year. Total fish production reached about 5.02 million tonnes that year, of which aquaculture supplied roughly 59 percent (about 2.98 million tonnes) and the remainder came from inland capture and marine fisheries.

== Shrimp farming ==
As of the end of 1987, prevailing methods for culturing shrimp in Bangladesh were still relatively unsophisticated, and average yields per hectare were low. In the late 1980s, almost all inland shrimping was done by capture rather than by intensive aquaculture. Farmers relied primarily on wild postlarval and juvenile shrimp as their sources of stock, acquired either by trapping in ponds during tidal water exchange or by gathering from local estuaries and stocking directly in the ponds. Despite the seemingly low level of technology applied to shrimp aquaculture, it became an increasingly important part of the frozen seafood industry in the mid-1980s. The shrimp farming industry in Bangladesh has been handicapped by low-quality and low prices.

The World Bank and the Asian Development Bank financed projects to develop shrimp aquaculture in the 1980s. Much of the emphasis was on construction of modern hatcheries. Private investors were also initiating similar projects to increase capacity and to introduce modern technology that would increase average yields. The Food and Agriculture Organization of the United Nations (FAO) has provided assistance to the shrimp and fishing industry in meeting fish safety and quality control standards based on the Hazard Analysis Critical Control Point (HACCP) approach.

Shrimp in the wild are associated with mangroves. Mangrove estuaries such as those found in the Sundarbans of southwestern Bangladesh are especially rich productive ecosystems and provide the spawning grounds for shrimp and fish. Intensive shrimp farming often involves conversion of mangrove stands to brine ponds where shrimp are grown.

== Training and education ==
Training for the fishing industry of Bangladesh, as well as for merchant shipping and related maritime industries is provided by the Bangladesh Marine Fisheries Academy.

== Labor practices ==
Shrimp and dried fish are emblematic of Bangladeshi cuisine. However, according to a 2014 Bureau of International Labor Affairs report, they also rank among the goods that are produced by child labour and forced labour in Bangladesh. The US Department of Labor also reported that "some children work under forced labor conditions in the dried fishing sector to help their families pay off debts to local moneylenders". The government of Bangladesh recognises that "some of the worst forms of child labor may exist in the rural sector (e.g. fish drying) and has been working with the ILO and other donors to craft an appropriate development program response."

== See also ==
- List of fish in Bangladesh
- Agriculture in Bangladesh
