= Batasio travancoria =

Conservation status
- Vulnerable (IUCN 3.1)

Scientific classification
- Kingdom: Animalia
- Phylum: Chordata
- Class: Actinopterygii
- Order: Siluriformes
- Family: Bagridae
- Genus: Batasio
- Species: B. travancoria

Binomial name
- Batasio travancoria Hora & Law, 1941

Species of freshwater fish

Batasio travancoria, the Travancore batasio, is a species of freshwater fish endemic to southern Kerala. It was described from a tributary of Pamba River in Kerala state of India, known as Peruthenaruvi. The species is dependent on high habitat quality and does not tolerate organic wastes in the water. It is classified as a vulnerable species by the IUCN.

== Etymology ==
The genus name is derived from the (Bengali) local name of the fish which is batasio or batashi.

== Description ==
The fish grows up to 100 mm in length. A species of Batasio having a short adipose dorsal fin, separated from caudal fin by a distinct space; body depth 4.8–5.5 in standard length; a longitudinal narrow dark streak along lateral line. It has a large sensory pores on its head and narrow jaw region. A pair of posteriorly directed processes on the anterior part of vomer, horizontally elongated pterygoid processes.

== Distribution ==
The species is distributed primarily in Asia especially Western Ghats of Kerala, India. This species is endemic to the Western Ghats of India. Since its first description from river Pampa in Kerala, several researchers including Kurup et al. (2004) reported the species from Pamba, Achenkoil, Periyar, Chalakudy, Manimala and Neyyar rivers. Silas (1951) reported this species from Anamalai Hills. Raghunathan collected this species from Coorg district, Karnataka in 1989.
