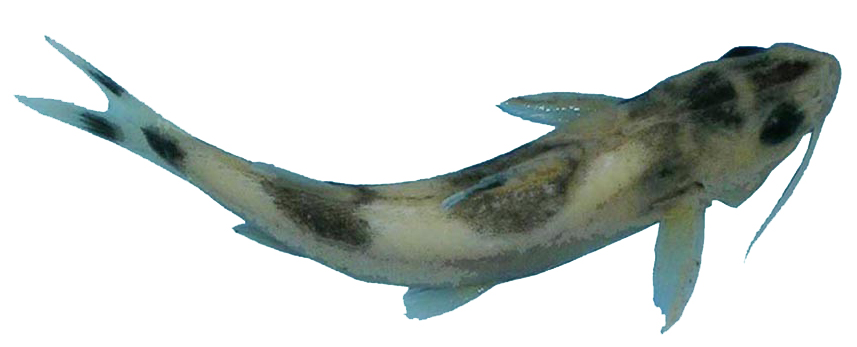

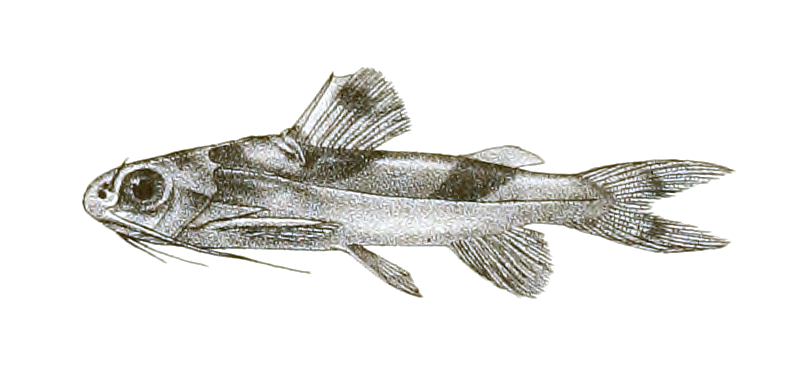

Conservation status
- Vulnerable (IUCN 3.1)

Scientific classification
- Kingdom: Animalia
- Phylum: Chordata
- Class: Actinopterygii
- Order: Siluriformes
- Family: Sisoridae
- Genus: Gagata
- Species: G. itchkeea

Binomial name
- Gagata itchkeea (Sykes, 1839)

Synonyms
- Phractocephalus itchkeea Sykes, 1839; Bagrus itchkeea (Sykes, 1839); Hemipimelodus itchkeea (Sykes, 1839); Macrones itchkeea (Sykes, 1839); Nangra itchkeea (Sykes, 1839); Pimelodus itchkeea (Sykes, 1839)

= Gagata itchkeea =

Species of fish

Gagata itchkeea is a species of sisorid catfish native to India and probably also to Pakistan. This species grows to a length of 7.6 centimetres (3.0 in) TL.
