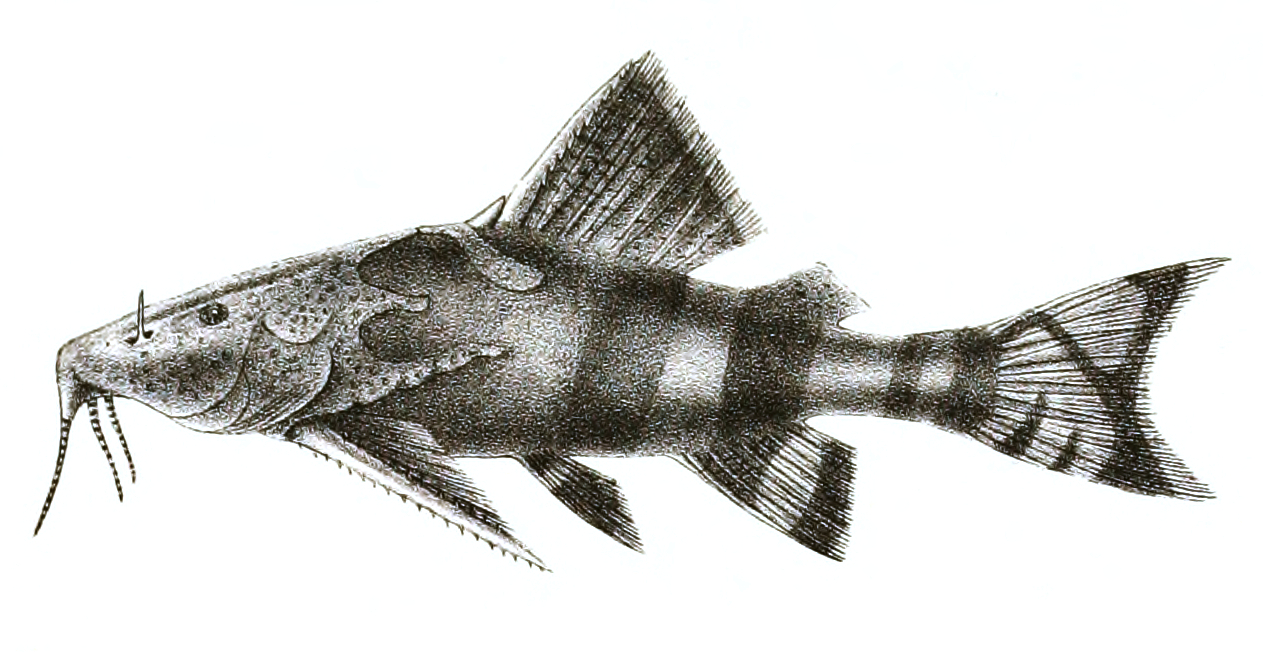
- Hara hara, syn. Erethistes hara

Scientific classification
- Domain: Eukaryota
- Kingdom: Animalia
- Phylum: Chordata
- Class: Actinopterygii
- Order: Siluriformes
- Family: Erethistidae
- Genus: Hara; Blyth, 1860

Type species
- Pimelodus hara F. Hamilton, 1822

= Hara (fish) =

Genus of fishes

Hara was a genus of South Asian river catfishes which is now considered invalid.

== Species ==
- Hara buchanani Blyth, 1860 valid as Erethistes hara (Hamilton, 1822)
- Hara elongata Day, 1872 valid as Conta conta (Hamilton, 1822)
- Hara filamentosa Blyth, 1860 valid as Erethistes filamentosus (Blyth, 1860)
- Hara hara (Hamilton, 1822) valid as Erethistes hara (Hamilton, 1822)
- Hara jerdoni F. Day, 1870 valid as Erethistes jerdoni (Day, 1860)
- Hara koladynensis Anganthoibi & Vishwanath, 2009 valid as Erethistes koladynensis (Anganthoibi & Vishwanath, 2009)
- Hara longissima H. H. Ng & Kottelat, 2007 valid as Erethistes longissimus (Ng & Kottelat, 2007)
- Hara malabarica F. Day, 1865 valid as Mystus canarensis Grant, 1999
- Hara mesembrina H. H. Ng & Kottelat, 2007 valid as Erethistes mesembrina (Ng & Kottelat, 2007)
- Hara minuscula H. H. Ng & Kottelat, 2007 valid as Erethistes minuscula (Ng & Kottelat, 2007)
- Hara nareshi Mahapatra & Kar, 2015 valid as Erethistes nareshi (Mahapatra & Kar, 2015)
- Hara saharsai Datta Munshi & Srivastava, 1988 valid as Erethistes hara (Hamilton, 1822)
- Hara serratus Vishwanath & Kosygin, 2000 valid as Erethistes hara (Hamilton, 1822)
- Hara spinulus H. H. Ng & Kottelat, 2007 valid as Erethistes spinulus (Ng & Kottelat, 2007)
