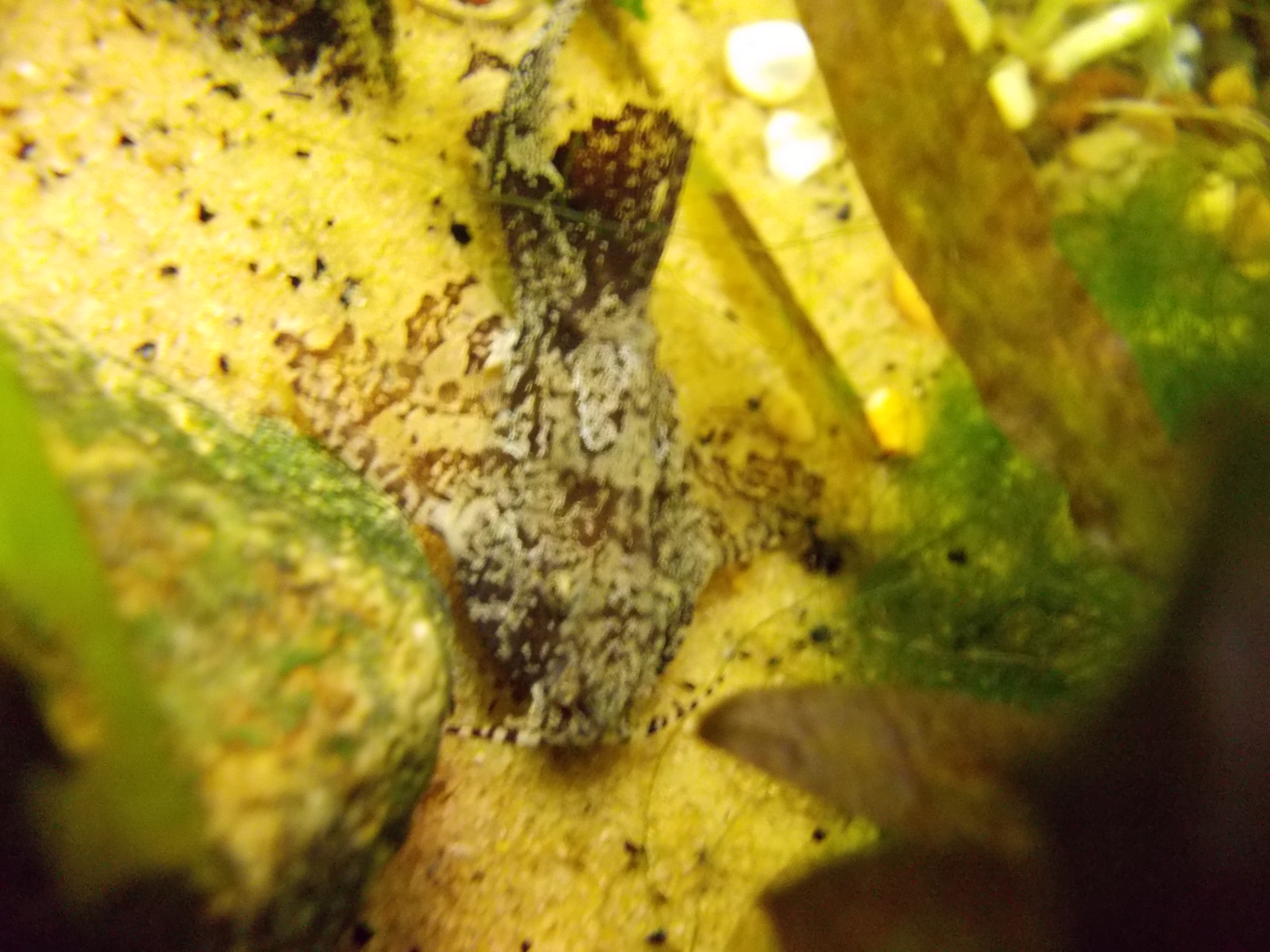

Conservation status
- Least Concern (IUCN 3.1)

Scientific classification
- Kingdom: Animalia
- Phylum: Chordata
- Class: Actinopterygii
- Order: Siluriformes
- Family: Sisoridae
- Genus: Erethistes
- Species: E. pusillus

Binomial name
- Erethistes pusillus J. P. Müller & Troschel, 1849

= Erethistes pusillus =

Species of fish

Erethistes pusillus is a species of South Asian river catfish native to India, Bangladesh and Myanmar where it is mostly found in hill streams. This species prefers muddy portions of rivers that are overgrown with vegetation. This species grows to a length of 4.2 centimetres (1.7 in) SL. It is kept in tropical aquaria, but its occurrence in the aquarium trade is very rare.
