= Gagata youssoufi =

Scientific classification
- Domain: Eukaryota
- Kingdom: Animalia
- Phylum: Chordata
- Class: Actinopterygii
- Order: Siluriformes
- Family: Sisoridae
- Genus: Gagata
- Species: G. youssoufi

Binomial name
- Gagata youssoufi Ataur Rahman, 1976

Species of fish

Gagata youssoufi is a species of sisorid catfish native to India and Bangladesh. This species grows to a length of 5 centimetres (2.0 in) SL.
