= Hara longissima =

Conservation status
- Data Deficient (IUCN 3.1)

Scientific classification
- Kingdom: Animalia
- Phylum: Chordata
- Class: Actinopterygii
- Order: Siluriformes
- Family: Sisoridae
- Genus: Hara
- Species: H. longissima

Binomial name
- Hara longissima H. H. Ng & Kottelat, 2007

Synonyms
- Erethistes longissima (Ng & Kottelat, 2007)

Species of fish

Hara longissima is a species of South Asian river catfish in the family Erethistidae. It is found in Myanmar.
