= Psilorhynchus nudithoracicus =

Scientific classification
- Domain: Eukaryota
- Kingdom: Animalia
- Phylum: Chordata
- Class: Actinopterygii
- Order: Cypriniformes
- Family: Psilorhynchidae
- Genus: Psilorhynchus
- Species: P. nudithoracicus

Binomial name
- Psilorhynchus nudithoracicus Tilak & Husain, 1980

Synonyms
- Psilorhynchus gracilis Rainboth, 1983

Species of fish

Psilorhynchus nudithoracicus also known as the rainbow minnow is a freshwater ray-finned fish, a torrent minnow, which is found in the drainage systems of the Ganges and the Brahmaputra in India, Nepal and Bangladesh, as well as the Meghna River and Surma River drainage basins in India and Bangladesh. the habitat of this species is shallow running streams with sandy bottoms, usually with some pebbles laying on the sand. This species reaches a length of 8.4 cm (3.3 in).
