= Cabdio ukhrulensis =

Conservation status
- Data Deficient (IUCN 3.1)

Scientific classification
- Kingdom: Animalia
- Phylum: Chordata
- Class: Actinopterygii
- Order: Cypriniformes
- Family: Danionidae
- Genus: Cabdio
- Species: C. ukhrulensis

Binomial name
- Cabdio ukhrulensis (Selim & Vishwanath, 2001)

Synonyms
- Aspidoparia ukhrulensis Selim & Vishwanath, 2001

Species of fish

Cabdio ukhrulensis, the Ukhrul carp, is a species of freshwater ray-finned fish belonging to the family Danionidae. This fish is found in India and Myanmar.
