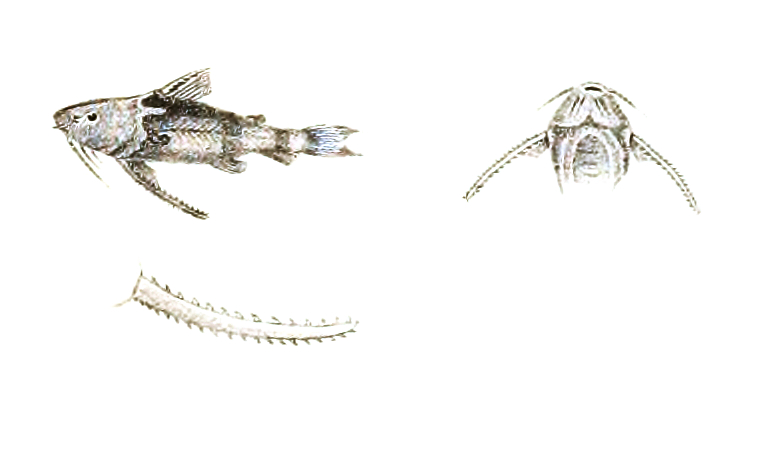

Conservation status
- Least Concern (IUCN 3.1)

Scientific classification
- Domain: Eukaryota
- Kingdom: Animalia
- Phylum: Chordata
- Class: Actinopterygii
- Order: Siluriformes
- Family: Erethistidae
- Genus: Hara
- Species: H. jerdoni

Binomial name
- Hara jerdoni F. Day, 1870

= Hara jerdoni =

Species of fish

Hara jerdoni, common name in English Sylhet Hara; also known as Asian Stone Catfish, or Dwarf Anchor Catfish, is a species of South Asian river catfish native to northeastern India and Bangladesh. This species grows to a length of 4 centimetres (1.6 in) TL. It is sometimes seen in the aquarium trade.
