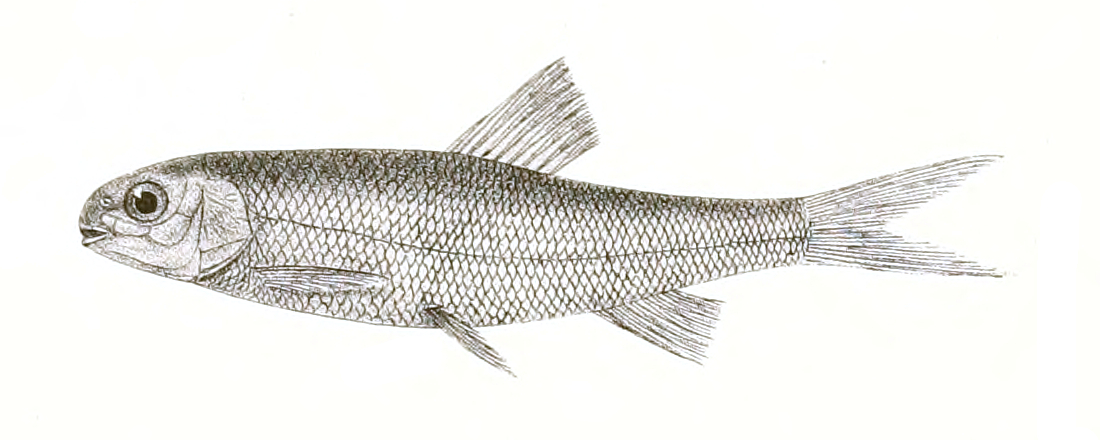

Conservation status
- Least Concern (IUCN 3.1)

Scientific classification
- Kingdom: Animalia
- Phylum: Chordata
- Class: Actinopterygii
- Order: Cypriniformes
- Family: Danionidae
- Genus: Cabdio
- Species: C. jaya

Binomial name
- Cabdio jaya (Hamilton, 1822)

Synonyms
- Cyprinus jaya Hamilton, 1822; Aspidoparia jaya (Hamilton, 1822); Leuciscus jaya (Hamilton, 1822); Leuciscus margarodes McClelland, 1839; Leuciscus margarodis McClelland, 1839

= Cabdio jaya =

Species of fish

Cabdio jaya, the jaya, is a species of freshwater ray-finned fish belonging to the family Danionidae. This fish is found in India, Nepal and Bangladesh where it occurs in hill streams. This species can reach a length of 15.0 centimetres (5.9 in) TL. This species is the type species of the genus Cabdio.
