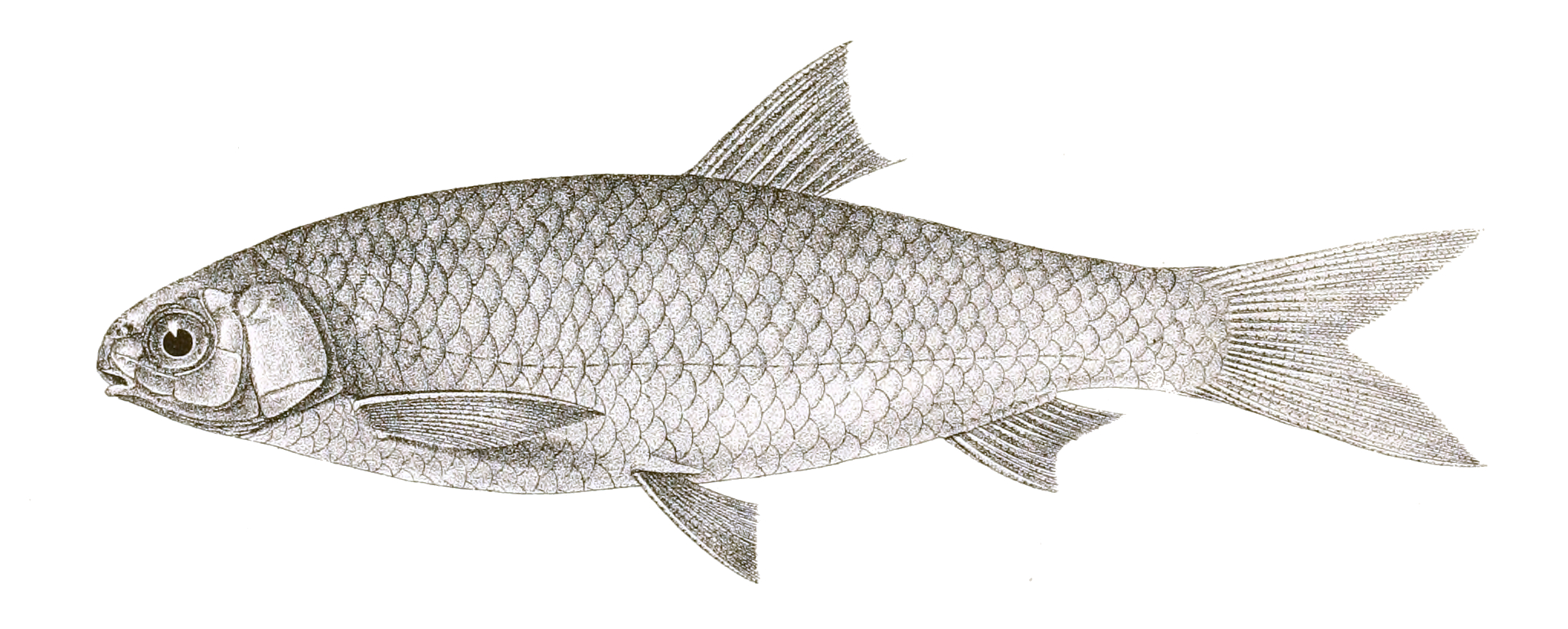

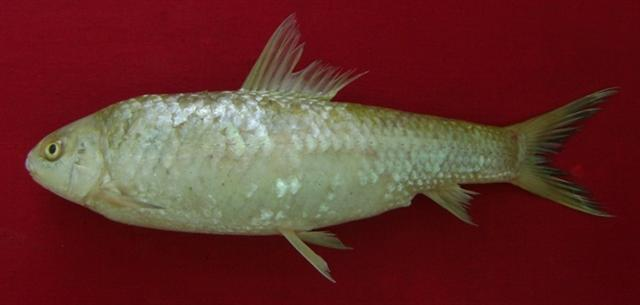

Conservation status
- Least Concern (IUCN 3.1)

Scientific classification
- Kingdom: Animalia
- Phylum: Chordata
- Class: Actinopterygii
- Order: Cypriniformes
- Family: Danionidae
- Subfamily: Chedrinae
- Genus: Cabdio
- Species: C. morar

Binomial name
- Cabdio morar Hamilton, 1822

Synonyms
- Cyprinus morar Hamilton, 1822; Aspidoparia morar (Hamilton, 1822); Leuciscus morar (Hamilton, 1822); Morara morar (Hamilton, 1822)

= Cabdio morar =

Species of fish

Cabdio morar is a species of freshwater ray-finned fish belonging to the family Danionidae. It reaches up to 20 cm (7.9 in) in length. It ranges from Iran, through northern South Asia, to Myanmar. The scientific name of the species was first published in 1822 by Hamilton.
