= Psilorhynchus robustus =

Conservation status
- Data Deficient (IUCN 3.1)

Scientific classification
- Kingdom: Animalia
- Phylum: Chordata
- Class: Actinopterygii
- Order: Cypriniformes
- Family: Psilorhynchidae
- Genus: Psilorhynchus
- Species: P. robustus

Binomial name
- Psilorhynchus robustus Conway & Kottelat, 2007

Species of fish

Psilorhynchus robustus is an Asian freshwater ray-finned fish of the torrent minnow genus Psilorhynchus. It is benthopelagic and found in the headwaters of the Ataran River basin in Burma (Myanmar).
