= Hara filamentosa =

Scientific classification
- Domain: Eukaryota
- Kingdom: Animalia
- Phylum: Chordata
- Class: Actinopterygii
- Order: Siluriformes
- Family: Erethistidae
- Genus: Hara
- Species: H. filamentosa

Binomial name
- Hara filamentosa Blyth, 1860

Species of fish

Hara filamentosa or Erethistes filamentosus is a species of South Asian river catfish found in Myanmar and Thailand. It can be found in the Ataran, Sittang, and Salween River drainages. It occurs in fast-flowing rivers with stony or sandy bottom. This species grows to a length of 5.0 centimetres (2.0 in) SL.
