= Francis Buchanan-Hamilton =

Scottish geographer, zoologist, and botanist (1762–1829)

Francis Buchanan-Hamilton FRSE FRS FLS
- Born: Francis Buchanan; 15 February 1762; Callander, Perthshire
- Died: 15 June 1829 (aged 67)
- Other names: Francis Hamilton, formerly Buchanan; Francis Hamilton; Buchanan-Hamilton; Francis Hamilton Buchanan; Francis Buchanan Hamilton
- Education: University of Edinburgh
- Known for: An account of the fishes found in the river Ganges and its branches
- Scientific career
- Workplaces: Calcutta botanical garden, Royal Botanic Garden, Edinburgh
- Author abbrev. (botany): Buch.-Ham.
- Author abbrev. (zoology): Hamilton, Hamilton-Buchanan

Francis Buchanan FRSE FRS FLS (15 February 1762 – 15 June 1829), later known as Francis Hamilton but often referred to as Francis Buchanan-Hamilton, was a Scottish surgeon, surveyor and botanist who made significant contributions as a geographer and zoologist while living in India. He did not assume the name of Hamilton until three years after his retirement from India.

The standard botanical author abbreviation Buch.-Ham. is applied to plants and animals he described, though today the form "Hamilton, 1822" is more usually seen in ichthyology and is preferred by Fishbase.

== Early life ==
Francis Buchanan was born at Bardowie, Callander, Perthshire where Elizabeth, his mother, lived on the estate of Branziet; his father Thomas, a physician, came in Spittal and claimed the chiefdom of the name of Buchanan and owned the Leny estate. Francis Buchanan matriculated in 1774 and received an MA in 1779. As he had three older brothers, he had to earn a living from a profession, so Buchanan studied medicine at the University of Edinburgh, graduating MD in 1783. His thesis was on febris intermittens (malaria). He then served on Merchant Navy ships to Asia, and served in the Bengal Medical Service from 1794 to 1815. He also studied botany under John Hope in Edinburgh. Hope was among the first to teach the Linnean system of botanical nomenclature, although he knew of several others having been trained under Antoine Laurent de Jussieu.

== Career in India ==
Buchanan's early career was on board ships plying between Britain and Asia. The first few years were spent as surgeon aboard the Duke of Montrose sailing between Bombay and China under Captain Alexander Gray and later Captain Joseph Dorin. He then served on the Phoenix along the Coromandel Coast again under Captain Gray. In 1794, he served on the Rose, sailing from Portsmouth to Calcutta, and reaching Calcutta in September, he joined the Medical Service of the Bengal Presidency. He was also a superintendent of the Institution for Promoting the Natural History of India. Buchanan's training was ideal as a surgeon naturalist for a political mission to the Kingdom of Ava in Burma under Captain Symes (as replacement for the previously appointed surgeon Peter Cochrane). The Ava mission set sail on the Sea Horse and passed the Andaman Islands, Pegu, and Ava before returning to Calcutta.

After returning from the Ava mission, Buchanan was stationed at Pattahaut near modern Chandpur. In 1798 the Company government, acting on William Roxburgh’s recommendation after Roxburgh fell ill and left India, appointed Buchanan to survey Chittagong and its neighbouring districts to assess their suitability for spice and crop cultivation. From 2 March to 21 May 1798 he conducted a wide-ranging survey that went well beyond its original mandate, recording soil conditions, cropping patterns, botanical observations, livestock, and native social institutions, and providing an early systematic account of the region’s society and economy.

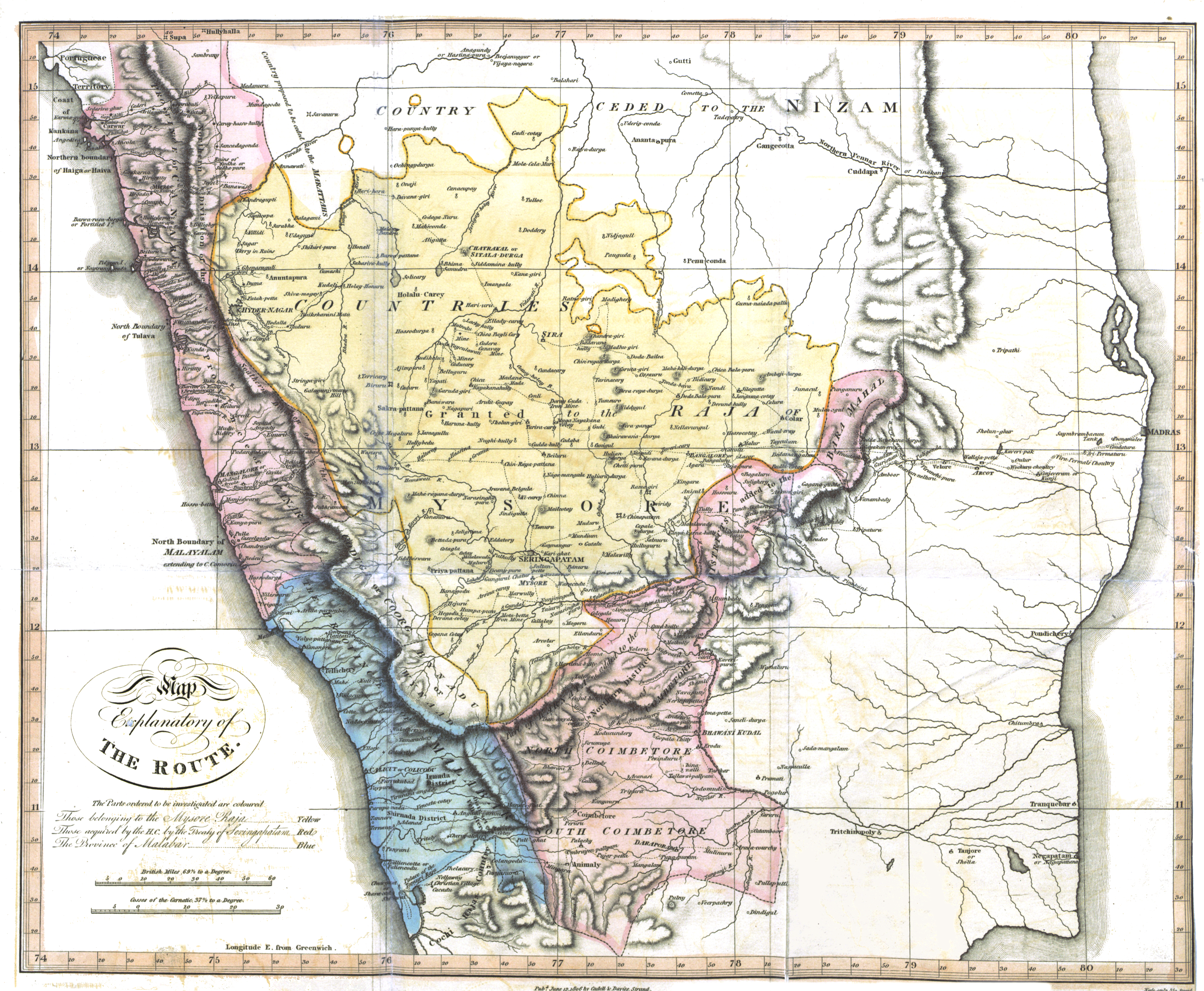
Map illustrating Buchanan-Hamilton's journey through southern India

In 1800, after the defeat of Tipu Sultan and the fall of Mysore, he was asked to survey South India, resulting in the three-volume work entitled A Journey from Madras through the Countries of Mysore, Canara and Malabar (1807).

From 1803 to 1804, he was surgeon to the governor general of India Lord Wellesley in Calcutta, where he also organized a zoo that was to become the Calcutta Alipore Zoo. In 1804, he was in charge of the Institution for Promoting the Natural History of India founded by Wellesley at Barrackpore.

From 1807 to 1814, under the instructions of the government of Bengal, he made a comprehensive survey of the areas within the jurisdiction of the British East India Company. He was asked to report on topography, history, antiquities, the condition of the inhabitants, religion, natural productions (particularly fisheries, forests, mines, and quarries), agriculture (covering vegetables, implements, manure, floods, domestic animals, fences, farms, and landed property, fine and common arts, and commerce (exports and imports, weights and measures, and conveyance of goods). He was accompanied on this survey by Bharat Singh, an accomplished botanical collector. Buchanan's conclusions are reported in a series of treatises that are retained in major United Kingdom libraries; many have been reissued in modern editions. They include an important work on Indian fish species, entitled An account of the fishes found in the river Ganges and its branches (1822), which describes over 100 species not formerly recognised scientifically.

Buchanan described Nepal in a later work, An Account of the Kingdom of Nepal (1819).

He also collected and described many new plants in the region, and collected a series of watercolours of Indian and Nepalese plants and animals, probably painted by Indian artists, which are now in the library of the Linnean Society of London.

He was elected a Fellow of the Royal Society in May, 1806, and a Fellow of the Royal Society of Edinburgh in January 1817.

== Later life ==
He succeeded William Roxburgh to become the superintendent of the Calcutta botanical garden in 1814, but had to return to Britain in 1815 due to his ill health. In an interesting incident, the notes that he took of Hope's botany lectures in 1780 were lent to his shipmate Alexander Boswell during a voyage in 1785. Boswell lost the notes in Satyamangalam in Mysore and the notes went into the hands of Tipu Sultan, who had them rebound. In 1800, they were found in Tippu's library by a major who returned them to Buchanan.

Buchanan left India in 1815, and in the same year inherited his mother's estate and in consequence took her surname of Hamilton, referring to himself as "Francis Hamilton, formerly Buchanan" or simply "Francis Hamilton". However, he is variously referred to by others as "Buchanan-Hamilton", "Francis Hamilton Buchanan", or "Francis Buchanan Hamilton".

From 1814 until 1829 he was the official Keeper of the Royal Botanic Garden, Edinburgh, succeeding William Roxburgh.

In 1822 he published his major work, An Account of the Fishes Found in the River Ganges and Its Branches The illustrations were most likely by a young Bengali artist, Haludar, whom Buchanan had trained in scientific illustration since the late 1790s, but about whom little else is known.

== Works ==
- A Journey from Madras through the Countries of Mysore, Canara and Malabar (3 volumes) (1807)
- An account of the districts of Bihar and Patna
- An account of the district of Bhagalpur
- An account of the district of Purnea
- An account of the district of Shahabad
- Journal of Francis Buchanan (afterwards Hamilton) kept during the survey of the districts of Panta nad Gaya in 1811–1812 (edited by V. H. Jackson)
- An Account of the Kingdom of Nepal (1819)
- An Account of the Fishes Found in the River Ganges and Its Branches (1822)

== Taxa named in his honor ==
=== Reptiles ===
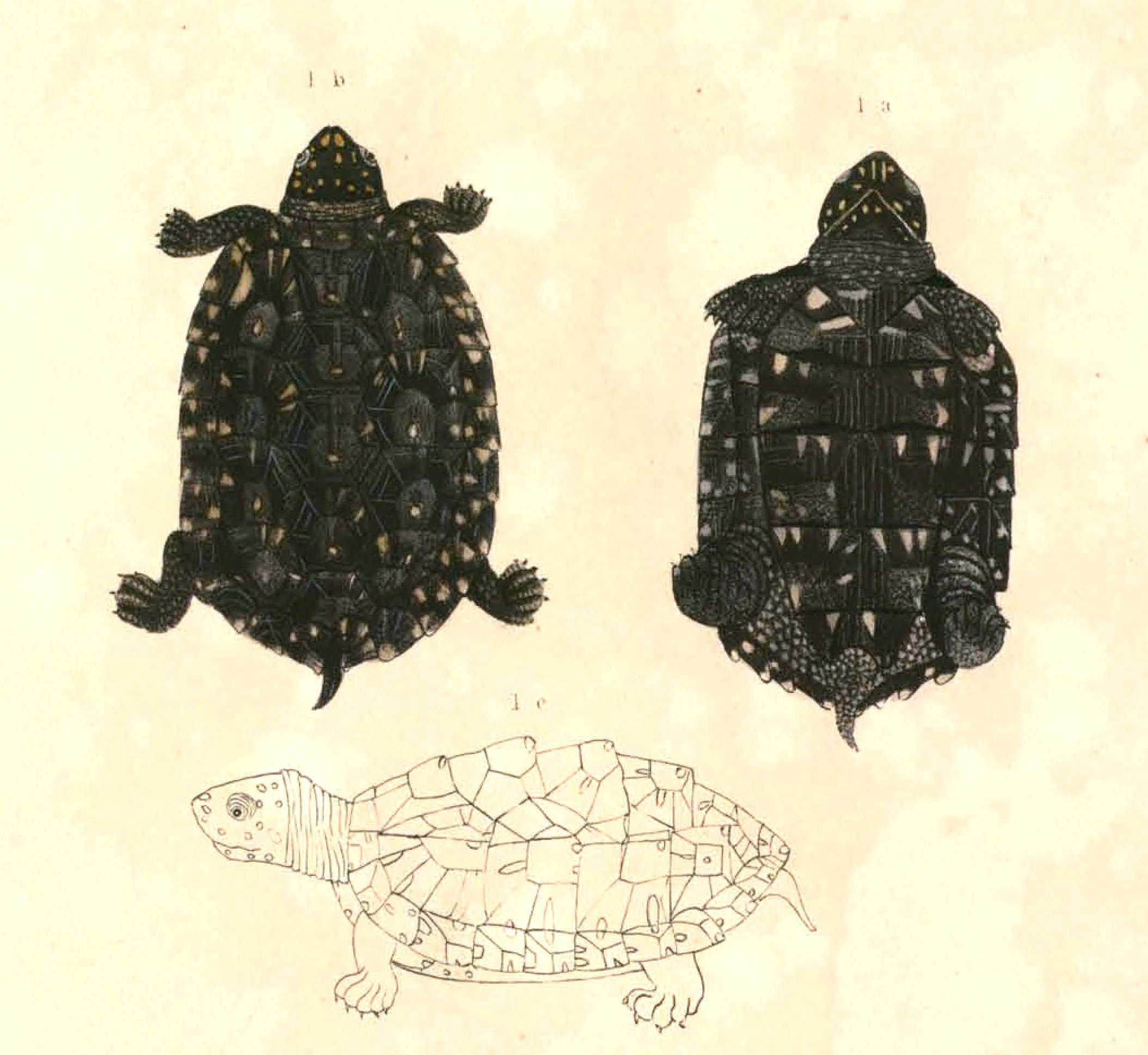
An illustration of Geoclemys hamiltonii (black pond turtle) by Thomas Hardwicke

- Francis Buchanan-Hamilton is commemorated in the scientific name of a species of South Asian turtle, Geoclemys hamiltoni.

=== Fishes ===
- The fish Thryssa hamiltonii is one of the many fishes named after Hamilton.
- The Burmese gobyeel, Taenioides buchanani (Day, 1873) is named after him.
- Notropis buchanani Meek 1896
- Psilorhynchus hamiltoni Conway, Dittmer, Jezisek & H.H. Ng, 2013
- The mullet Crenimugil buchanani (Bleeker, 1853)
- The mullet Sicamugil hamiltonii (Day, 1870)
- The mahseer Tor hamiltonii Gray, 1834, junior synonym of Tor tor named by Hamilton in 1822

== Taxa described by him ==
- See Category:Taxa named by Francis Buchanan-Hamilton

== See also ==
- Claudius Buchanan Rev. Claudius Buchanan was also frequently referred as Dr. Buchanan in missionary journals.
