= Discogobio dienbieni =

Scientific classification
- Domain: Eukaryota
- Kingdom: Animalia
- Phylum: Chordata
- Class: Actinopterygii
- Order: Cypriniformes
- Family: Cyprinidae
- Subfamily: Labeoninae
- Genus: Discogobio
- Species: D. dienbieni

Binomial name
- Discogobio dienbieni Nguyen, 2001

Species of fish

Discogobio dienbieni is a fish species in the genus Discogobio endemic to Vietnam. The fish lives in freshwater.

== Cypriniformes ==
Discogobio dienbieni is in the Cypriniformes (Carp) family.

== See also ==
- Discogobio bismargaritus
- Discogobio tetrabarbatus
- Discogobio microstoma
- Discogobio elongatus
- Discogobio yunnanensis
- Discogobio laticeps
- Discogobio macrophysallidos
- Discogobio brachyphysallidos
