= Euchiloglanis =

Scientific classification
- Kingdom: Animalia
- Phylum: Chordata
- Class: Actinopterygii
- Order: Siluriformes
- Family: Sisoridae
- Subfamily: Glyptosterninae
- Genus: Euchiloglanis; Regan, 1907

Genus of fishes

Euchiloglanis was a proposed genus of sisorid catfishes native to Asia. Species were moved to other genera once it was synonymised with Chimarrichthys.

== Species ==
The species proposed for this genus were:

- Euchiloglanis dorsoarcus; incertae sedis as Pareuchiloglanis dorsoarcus
- Euchiloglanis feae; valid as Barbeuchiloglanis feae
- Euchiloglanis gracilicaudata; valid as Sineuchiloglanis gracilicaudata
- Euchiloglanis hodgarti; valid as Parachiloglanis hodgarti
- Euchiloglanis kamengensis; valid as Creteuchiloglanis kamengensis
- Euchiloglanis kishinouyei; valid as Chimarrichthys kishinouyei
- Euchiloglanis longibarbatus; valid as Chimarrichthys longibarbatus
- Euchiloglanis longicauda; valid as Tremeuchiloglanis longicauda
- Euchiloglanis longus; valid as Chimarrichthys longus
- Euchiloglanis macrotrema; valid as Tremeuchiloglanis macrotrema
- Euchiloglanis myzostoma; valid as Sineuchiloglanis myzostoma
- Euchiloglanis nami; valid as Chimarrichthys nami
- Euchiloglanis phongthoensis; incertae sedis as Pareuchiloglanis phongthoensis
- Euchiloglanis sinensis; valid as Tremeuchiloglanis sinensis
