= Pareuchiloglanis =

Scientific classification
- Domain: Eukaryota
- Kingdom: Animalia
- Phylum: Chordata
- Class: Actinopterygii
- Order: Siluriformes
- Family: Sisoridae
- Tribe: Glyptosternina
- Genus: Pareuchiloglanis; Pellegrin, 1936

Type species
- Pareuchiloglanis poilanei Pellegrin, 1936

Genus of fishes

Pareuchiloglanis is a genus of sisorid catfishes native to Asia. These species are rheophilic catfish chiefly found in the headwaters of major rivers in South and East Asia. They originate from the Brahmaputra drainage in India, east and south to the Yangtze drainage in China and the Annamese Cordillera drainages in southern Vietnam. Two species are known from the Mekong River: P. myzostoma and P. gracilicaudata. Four species are known from the (upper Mekong River) drainage of China: P. abbreviatus, P. gracilicaudata, P. myzostoma and P. prolixdorsalis.

== Taxonomy ==
The monophyly of this genus remains doubtful. In 2007, a study rejected the monophyly of this genus.

The premaxillary tooth bands in the catfish tribe Glyptosternina are important in identifying genera; in Pareuchiloglanis, the tooth band is divided into two patches, appearing in two types. In one type, the premaxillary tooth patches appear separate, divided down the middle by a deeper indentation; this type is characteristic in P. feae. This group is distributed in and to the west of the Lancangjiang River and overlaps the distribution of Oreoglanis, Pseudexostoma and Exostoma. In the other type, the premaxillary tooth patches appear to be joined with a shallow indentation in the middle; this type is characteristic of all other species of Pareuchiloglanis. This group is distributed in and to the east of the Lancangjiang.

== Species ==
There are currently 20 recognized species in this genus:

- Pareuchiloglanis abbreviata X. Li, W. Zhou, A. W. Thomson, Q. Zhang & Y. Yang, 2007
- Pareuchiloglanis anteanalis S. M. Fang, T. Q. Xu & G. H. Cui, 1984
- Pareuchiloglanis brevicaudata V. H. Nguyễn, 2005
- Pareuchiloglanis feae (Vinciguerra, 1890)
- Pareuchiloglanis gracilicaudata (Y. F. Wu & Y. Chen, 1979)
- Pareuchiloglanis hupingshanensis Z. J. Kang, Y. X. Chen & D. K. He, 2016
- Pareuchiloglanis longicauda (P. Q. Yue, 1981)
- Pareuchiloglanis macrotrema (Norman, 1925)
- Pareuchiloglanis myzostoma (Norman, 1923)
- Pareuchiloglanis namdeensis V. H. Nguyễn, 2005
- Pareuchiloglanis nebulifera H. H. Ng & Kottelat, 2000
- Pareuchiloglanis phongthoensis (V. H. Nguyễn, 2005)
- Pareuchiloglanis poilanei Pellegrin, 1936
- Pareuchiloglanis prolixdorsalis X. Li, W. Zhou, A. W. Thomson, Q. Zhang & Y. Yang, 2007
- Pareuchiloglanis rhabdura H. H. Ng, 2004
- Pareuchiloglanis robusta R. H. Ding, T. Y. Fu & M. R. Ye, 1991
- Pareuchiloglanis sichuanensis R. H. Ding, T. Y. Fu & M. R. Ye, 1991
- Pareuchiloglanis sinensis (Hora & Silas, 1952)
- Pareuchiloglanis songdaensis H. D. Nguyễn & V. H. Nguyễn, 2001
- Pareuchiloglanis tamduongensis V. H. Nguyễn, 2005
- Pareuchiloglanis tianquanensis R. H. Ding & S. G. Fang, 1997

== Description ==
Pareuchiloglanis species have an interrupted groove behind their lips (post-labial groove), gill openings not extending onto the underside (venter), homodont dentition of pointed teeth in both jaws, tooth patches in the upper jaw joined into a band and not produced posteriorly at sides, and 13–16 branched pectoral rays. The head is depressed and the body is elongate and depressed anteriorly. The skin is smooth dorsally, but it is often tuberculate ventrally. The eyes are minute, dorsal, and under the skin (subcutaneous). The lips are thick, fleshy, and papillated. The paired fins are plaited to form an adhesive apparatus.
