= C. pectinata =

C. pectinata may refer to:

- Caladenia pectinata, a plant species
- Conta pectinata, a catfish species
- Cotula pectinata, a flowering plant species in the genus Cotula
- Chloris pectinata, a grass
- Ctenosaura pectinata, the Mexican spiny-tailed iguana, a moderate sized lizard species native to western Mexico
- Cycas pectinata, a plant species in the genus Cycas

== Synonyms ==
- Caesalpinia pectinata, a synonym for Caesalpinia spinosa, the tara, atree species native to Peru

== See also ==
- Pectinata
