= Konta =

Konta may refer to:

== Places ==
- Konta special woreda, South West Region, Ethiopia
- Konta, Chhattisgarh, India
  - Konta Assembly constituency
- Konta, Iran

== People ==
- Konta people of Ethiopia

=== Persons ===
- Annie Lemp Konta (died 1939), U.S. writer and socialite
- Johanna Konta (born 1991), British tennis player
- Toshimasa Konta (born 1980), Japanese baseball player

== Other uses ==
- Konta dialect from the Konta language of Ethiopia
- Kingdom of Konta

== See also ==
- Pio Konta (Greek: Πιο κοντά, lit. 'Even Closer'), a 2009 album by Greek singer Kostas Martakis
- Konte (disambiguation)
- Konti (disambiguation)
- Conta (disambiguation)
