= Parachiloglanis bhutanensis =

Scientific classification
- Kingdom: Animalia
- Phylum: Chordata
- Class: Actinopterygii
- Order: Siluriformes
- Family: Sisoridae
- Genus: Parachiloglanis
- Species: P. bhutanensis

Binomial name
- Parachiloglanis bhutanensis Thoni & Gurung - 2014

Species of catfish

Parachiloglanis bhutanensis, also known as the Khaling torrent catfish, is a species of catfish in the family Sisoridae first described in 2014. Prior to its discovery, the genus Parachiloglanis was considered monotypic.

== Classification ==
Parachiloglanis bhutanensis is the first fish species scientifically described within Bhutan, whereas Parachiloglanis hodgarti was found in Pharping, Nepal. The common name, Khaling torrent catfish, refers to the village, Khaling, in the Trashigang District of southeastern Bhutan where the stream in which it was discovered flows. A subsequent study by Thoni & Gurung in 2018 identified two specimens in the Bumdeling Wildlife Sanctuary in the northeast of Bhutan, expanding the previously known range of the species to throughout the upper Drangmechhu River.

== Description ==
Parachiloglanis bhutanensis has a brown, somewhat translucent body, with a pale yellow head. The average length of the specimens collected by Thoni & Gurung (2014) was 3 to 4 inches. The head is broad, blunt, and rounded, rising out of the body at roughly a 45-degree angle from the snout. Along the sides of the body, there is a lateral line of white pores.

Parachiloglanis bhutanensis is different from the first Parachiloglanis species, Parachiloglanis hodgarti, by the lateral white pores running the length of the body, and differs from the other genera in the subfamily Glyptosterninae by the absence of a post-labial grove on the lower lip.

== Ecology ==
The first specimens of Parachiloglanis bhutanensis were discovered in the cascades of a small, fast-flowing stream, over 2,000 meters above sea level, while adhering to the underside of boulders. The initial streams near Khaling were fed by mountain springs, rainwater, and snow melted from nearby mountains, with very little algae. Thoni & Gurung speculated that the species evolved to a high-speed environment with paired fins to cling to rocks and a mouth that adapted to scraping invertebrates from the bottom of the streams.
