= Pseudecheneis paucipunctata =

Scientific classification
- Kingdom: Animalia
- Phylum: Chordata
- Class: Actinopterygii
- Order: Siluriformes
- Family: Sisoridae
- Genus: Pseudecheneis
- Species: P. paucipunctata

Binomial name
- Pseudecheneis paucipunctata W. Zhou, X. Li & Y. Yang, 2008

Species of sisorid catfish

Pseudecheneis paucipunctata is a species of sisorid catfish. It is found in the Upper Nujiang Salween River drainage in Yunnan, China.

== Description ==
Pseudecheneis paucipunctata reaches a standard length of 13.5 cm (5.3 in).
