= Conta (disambiguation) =

Conta is a genus of catfish.

Conta may also refer to:

- Conta (surname)
- Contà, a municipality in Trentino, Italy
- Conta conta (C. conta), a species of catfish

== See also ==
- De Contas River, a river in Brazil
- Conte (disambiguation)
- Conti (disambiguation)
- Conto
- Cont (disambiguation)
- Konta (disambiguation)
