= Pseudecheneis longipectoralis =

Conservation status
- Data Deficient (IUCN 3.1)

Scientific classification
- Kingdom: Animalia
- Phylum: Chordata
- Class: Actinopterygii
- Order: Siluriformes
- Family: Sisoridae
- Genus: Pseudecheneis
- Species: P. longipectoralis

Binomial name
- Pseudecheneis longipectoralis W. Zhou, X. Li & Y. Yang, 2008

Species of sisorid catfish

Pseudecheneis longipectoralis is a species of sisorid catfish. It is found in the middle Nujiang Salween River drainage in Yunnan, China.

== Description ==
Pseudecheneis longipectoralis reaches a standard length of 13.3 cm (5.2 in).
