= Pseudecheneis gracilis =

Scientific classification
- Domain: Eukaryota
- Kingdom: Animalia
- Phylum: Chordata
- Class: Actinopterygii
- Order: Siluriformes
- Family: Sisoridae
- Genus: Pseudecheneis
- Species: P. gracilis

Binomial name
- Pseudecheneis gracilis W. Zhou, X. Li & Y. Yang, 2008

Species of sisorid catfish

Pseudecheneis gracilis is a species of sisorid catfish found in the Longchuanjiang River, which is a tributary of the Irrawaddy River in Yunnan, China.

== Description ==
Pseudecheneis gracilis reaches a standard length of 18.8 cm (7.4 in).
