= Pseudecheneis brachyura =

Scientific classification
- Kingdom: Animalia
- Phylum: Chordata
- Class: Actinopterygii
- Order: Siluriformes
- Family: Sisoridae
- Genus: Pseudecheneis
- Species: P. brachyura

Binomial name
- Pseudecheneis brachyura W. Zhou, X. Li & Y. Yang, 2008

Species of sisorid catfish

Pseudecheneis brachyura is a species of sisorid catfish found in the Dayinjiang and the Longchuanjiang rivers, which are tributaries of the Irrawaddy River in Yunnan, China.

== Description ==
Pseudecheneis brachyura reaches a standard length of 15.5 cm (6.1 in).
