= Pseudecheneis ukhrulensis =

Conservation status
- Vulnerable (IUCN 3.1)

Scientific classification
- Kingdom: Animalia
- Phylum: Chordata
- Class: Actinopterygii
- Order: Siluriformes
- Family: Sisoridae
- Genus: Pseudecheneis
- Species: P. ukhrulensis

Binomial name
- Pseudecheneis ukhrulensis Vishwanath & Darshan, 2007

Species of fish

Pseudecheneis ukhrulensis is a species of sisorid catfish found in the Chindwin River basin in Manipur, India.
