= Erethistoides luteolus =

Scientific classification
- Domain: Eukaryota
- Kingdom: Animalia
- Phylum: Chordata
- Class: Actinopterygii
- Order: Siluriformes
- Family: Erethistidae
- Genus: Erethistoides
- Species: E. luteolus

Binomial name
- Erethistoides luteolus H. H. Ng, Ferraris & Neely, 2012

Fish species

Erethistoides luteolus is a species of sisorid catfish in the family Erethistidae. It is found in the upper Sittaung River basin in central Myanmar.

== Description ==
Erethistoides luteolus reaches a standard length of 2.6 cm (1.0 in).
