= Exostoma berdmorei =

Conservation status
- Data Deficient (IUCN 3.1)

Scientific classification
- Kingdom: Animalia
- Phylum: Chordata
- Class: Actinopterygii
- Order: Siluriformes
- Family: Sisoridae
- Genus: Exostoma
- Species: E. berdmorei

Binomial name
- Exostoma berdmorei Blyth, 1860

Species of sisorid catfish

Exostoma berdmorei is a species of sisorid catfish in the family Sisoridae. It is found in Myanmar and Thailand.

== Description ==
Exostoma berdmorei reaches a total length of 10.0 cm (3.9 in).

== Etymology ==
The fish is named for Major Hugh Thomas Berdmore (1811–1859) of the Madras Artillery, who provided the type specimen.
