= Discogobio =

Scientific classification
- Kingdom: Animalia
- Phylum: Chordata
- Class: Actinopterygii
- Order: Cypriniformes
- Family: Cyprinidae
- Subfamily: Labeoninae
- Genus: Discogobio; S. Y. Lin, 1931

Type species
- Discogobio tetrabarbatus S.Y. Lin, 1931

Genus of fishes

Discogobio is a genus of cyprinid fish that are found in eastern Asia. So far the 16 species have only been identified from China (12 species) and Vietnam (5 species) wherein each species is endemic to the country in which it is found.

== Species ==
- Discogobio angustimarginis Yi, Deng & Zhang, 2025
- Discogobio antethoracalis L. P. Zheng & W. Zhou, 2008
- Discogobio bismargaritus X. L. Chu, G. H. Cui & W. Zhou, 1993
- Discogobio brachyphysallidos S. Y. Huang, 1989
- Discogobio caobangi V. H. Nguyễn, 2001
- Discogobio dienbieni V. H. Nguyễn, 2001
- Discogobio elongatus S. Y. Huang, 1989
- Discogobio laticeps X. L. Chu, G. H. Cui & W. Zhou, 1993
- Discogobio longibarbatus H. W. Wu, 1977
- Discogobio macrophysallidos S. Y. Huang, 1989
- Discogobio microstoma (Đ. Y. Mai, 1978)
- Discogobio multilineatus G. H. Cui, W. Zhou & J. H. Lan, 1993
- Discogobio pacboensis V. H. Nguyễn, 2001
- Discogobio poneventralis L. P. Zheng & W. Zhou, 2008
- Discogobio propeanalis L. P. Zheng & W. Zhou, 2008
- Discogobio tetrabarbatus S. Y. Lin, 1931
- Discogobio yunnanensis (Regan, 1907)
