= Discogobio propeanalis =

Scientific classification
- Kingdom: Animalia
- Phylum: Chordata
- Class: Actinopterygii
- Order: Cypriniformes
- Family: Cyprinidae
- Subfamily: Labeoninae
- Genus: Discogobio
- Species: D. propeanalis

Binomial name
- Discogobio propeanalis Zheng & Zhou, 2008

Species of fish

Discogobio propeanalis is a species of cyprinid fish in the subfamily Labeoninae. It is endemic to the Shundian River, a tributary of the Red River in Yunnan (China). It can grow to 9.1 cm (3.6 in) standard length.
