= E. kishinouyei =

E. kishinouyei may refer to:

- Eumeces kishinouyei, the Kishinoue's giant skink, a lizard species found only in Japan
- Euchiloglanis kishinouyei, a synonym for Euchiloglanis davidi, a catfish species found in the Yangtze drainage in China

== See also ==
- Kishinouyei (disambiguation)
