= Discogobio poneventralis =

Scientific classification
- Kingdom: Animalia
- Phylum: Chordata
- Class: Actinopterygii
- Order: Cypriniformes
- Family: Cyprinidae
- Subfamily: Labeoninae
- Genus: Discogobio
- Species: D. poneventralis

Binomial name
- Discogobio poneventralis Zheng & Zhou, 2008

Species of fish

Discogobio poneventralis is a species of cyprinid fish in the subfamily Labeoninae. It is endemic to the Panlong River, a tributary of the Red River in Yunnan, China. It can grow to 10.2 cm (4.0 in) standard length.
