= Erethistoides pipri =

Conservation status
- Data Deficient (IUCN 3.1)

Scientific classification
- Kingdom: Animalia
- Phylum: Chordata
- Class: Actinopterygii
- Order: Siluriformes
- Family: Sisoridae
- Genus: Erethistoides
- Species: E. pipri

Binomial name
- Erethistoides pipri Hora, 1950

Species of fish

Erethistoides pipri is a species of South Asian river catfish endemic to India where it is found in the Rihand and Sone Rivers. This species grows to a length of 3.1 centimetres (1.2 in) SL.
