= Discogobio multilineatus =

Scientific classification
- Kingdom: Animalia
- Phylum: Chordata
- Class: Actinopterygii
- Order: Cypriniformes
- Family: Cyprinidae
- Subfamily: Labeoninae
- Genus: Discogobio
- Species: D. multilineatus

Binomial name
- Discogobio multilineatus Cui, Zhou, & Lan, 1993

Species of fish

Discogobio multilineatus is a fish species in the genus Discogobio endemic to a branch of the Hongshui River in China.
