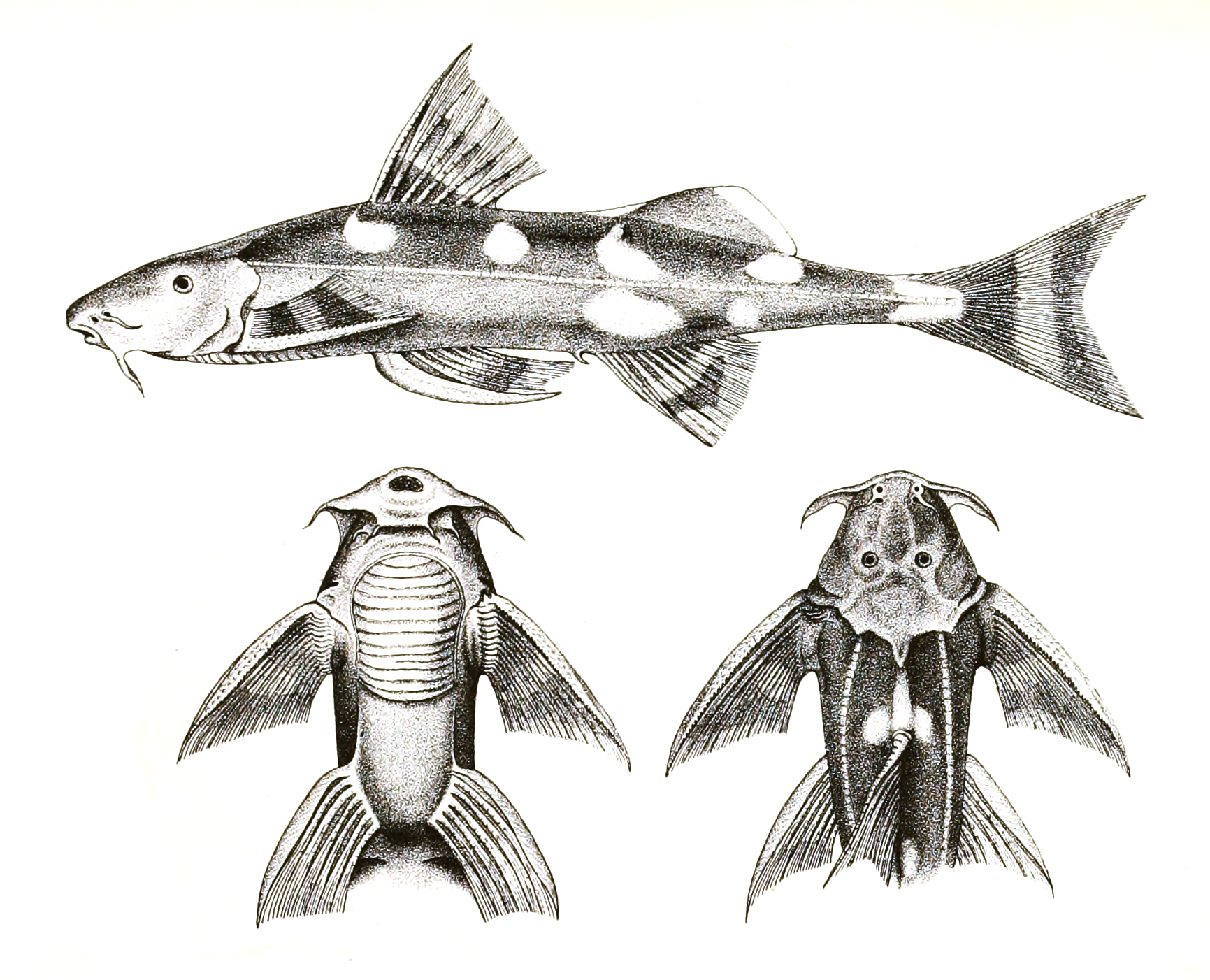

Conservation status
- Least Concern (IUCN 3.1)

Scientific classification
- Kingdom: Animalia
- Phylum: Chordata
- Class: Actinopterygii
- Order: Siluriformes
- Family: Sisoridae
- Genus: Pseudecheneis
- Species: P. sulcata

Binomial name
- Pseudecheneis sulcata (McClelland, 1842)

Synonyms
- Glyptosternon sulcatus McClelland, 1842; Pseudecheneis sulcatus (McClelland, 1842); Pseudoecheineus sulcatus (McClelland, 1842)

= Pseudecheneis sulcata =

Species of sisorid catfish

Pseudecheneis sulcata, the sucker throat catfish, is a species of sisorid catfish. It is found in India, Nepal and Bangladesh.

== Description ==
Pseudecheneis sulcata reaches a standard length of 20 cm (7.9 in).
