= Erethistoides senkhiensis =

Conservation status
- Data Deficient (IUCN 3.1)

Scientific classification
- Kingdom: Animalia
- Phylum: Chordata
- Class: Actinopterygii
- Order: Siluriformes
- Family: Sisoridae
- Genus: Erethistoides
- Species: E. senkhiensis

Binomial name
- Erethistoides senkhiensis Tamang, Chaudhry & Choudhury, 2008

Species of fish

Erethistoides senkhiensis is a species of South Asian river catfish endemic to India where it is found in Senkhi stream, Arunachal Pradesh. This species grows to a length of 4.34 centimetres (1.71 in) SL.
