= Erethistoides infuscatus =

Conservation status
- Data Deficient (IUCN 3.1)

Scientific classification
- Kingdom: Animalia
- Phylum: Chordata
- Class: Actinopterygii
- Order: Siluriformes
- Family: Sisoridae
- Genus: Erethistoides
- Species: E. infuscatus

Binomial name
- Erethistoides infuscatus H. H. Ng, 2006

Species of fish

Erethistoides infuscatus is a species of South Asian river catfish native to India and Bangladesh where it is found in the drainages of the Brahmaputra and Meghna Rivers. This species grows to a length of 4.5 centimetres (1.8 in) SL.
