= Erethistoides vesculus =

Scientific classification
- Domain: Eukaryota
- Kingdom: Animalia
- Phylum: Chordata
- Class: Actinopterygii
- Order: Siluriformes
- Family: Erethistidae
- Genus: Erethistoides
- Species: E. vesculus

Binomial name
- Erethistoides vesculus H. H. Ng, Ferraris & Neely, 2012

Fish species

Erethistoides vesculus is a species of sisorid catfish in the family Erethistidae. It is found in the Ann Chaung River basin of western Myanmar.

== Description ==
Erethistoides vesculus reaches a standard length of 2.9 cm (1.1 in).
