= Exostoma labiatum =

Conservation status
- Least Concern (IUCN 3.1)

Scientific classification
- Kingdom: Animalia
- Phylum: Chordata
- Class: Actinopterygii
- Order: Siluriformes
- Family: Sisoridae
- Genus: Exostoma
- Species: E. labiatum

Binomial name
- Exostoma labiatum (McClelland, 1842)

Synonyms
- Glyptosternon labiatus McClelland, 1842; Exostoma labiatus (McClelland, 1842)

Species of fish

Exostoma labiatum, the Burmese bat catfish, is a species of sisorid catfish in the family Sisoridae. It is found in India.

== Description ==
Exostoma labiatum reaches a total length of 11.0 cm (4.3 in).
