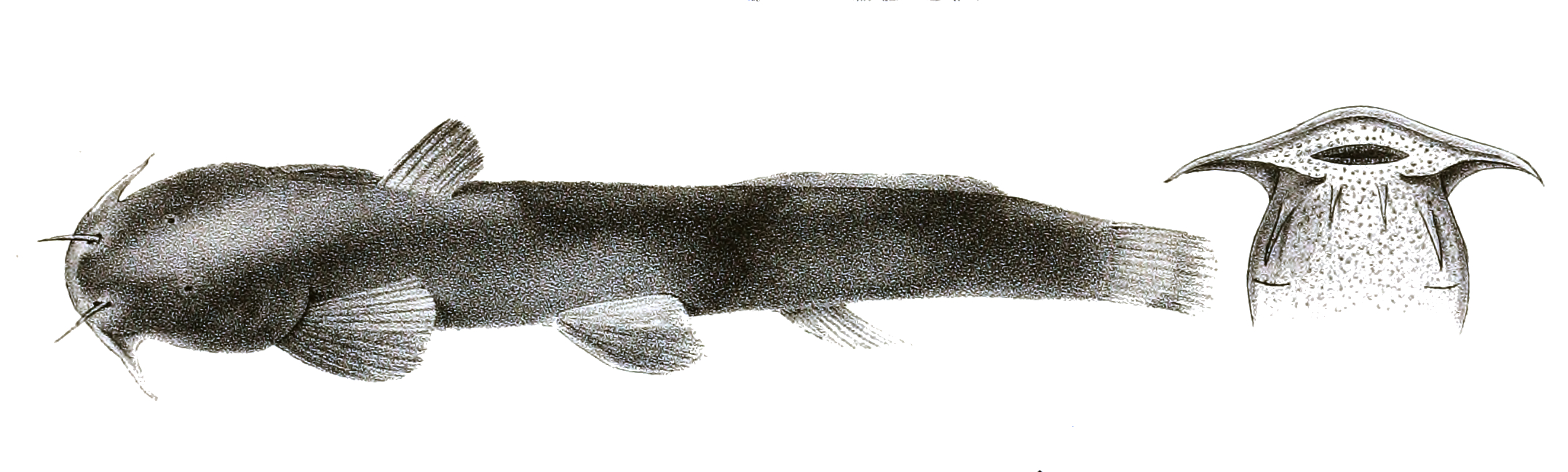
- Glyptosternon reticulatum

Scientific classification
- Kingdom: Animalia
- Phylum: Chordata
- Class: Actinopterygii
- Order: Siluriformes
- Family: Sisoridae
- Tribe: Glyptosternina
- Genus: Glyptosternon; McClelland, 1842

Type species
- Glyptosternon reticulatum McClelland, 1842

Synonyms
- Glyptosternum Agassiz, 1846; Parexostoma Regan, 1905

= Glyptosternon =

Genus of fishes

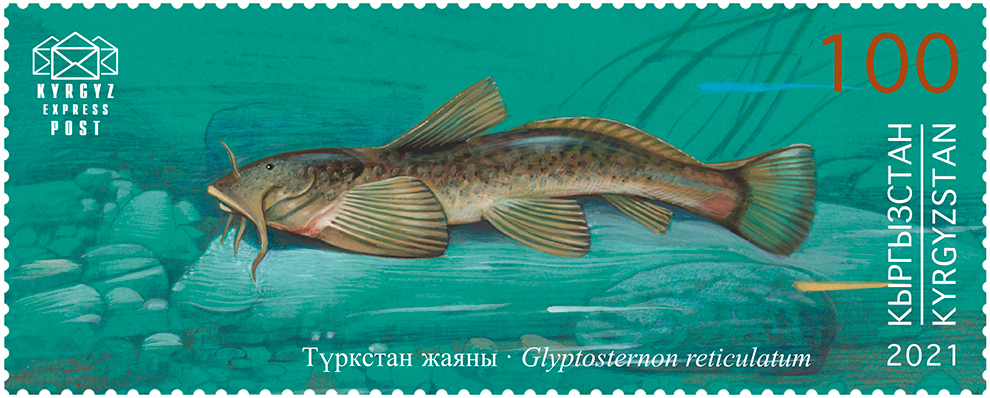
Glyptosternon reticulatum on a 2021 stamp of Kyrgyzstan

Glyptosternon is a genus of sisorid catfishes native to Asia.

== Species ==
There are currently four recognized species in this genus:

- Glyptosternon akhtari Silas, 1952
- Glyptosternon maculatum (Regan, 1905)
- Glyptosternon oschanini (Herzenstein, 1889) (Oshanin catfish)
- Glyptosternon reticulatum McClelland, 1842 (Turkestan catfish)

Some authorities recognize another:

- Glyptosternon malaisei Rendahl & Vestergren, 1941 but this is considered a synonym of Glaridoglanis andersonii by ECoF.

== Distribution ==
Glyptosternon species are distributed in Indus drainage in Afghanistan, Pakistan, India (in the state of Jammu and Kashmir), Uzbekistan, Tajikistan, Kyrgyzstan and western China, east to the Irrawaddy drainage in Burma. G. akhtari is from the Bamian River of the Oxus Watershed of the Indus drainage in Afghanistan. G. maculatum is found in the Brahmaputra drainage of India and China. G. reticulatum is from the Indus drainage including Afghanistan, Pakistan, Kashmir, and western China. G. oschanini is known from the Upper Syr Darya and probably Amu Darya in Kyrgyzstan, Uzbekistan and Tajikistan

== Description ==
Glyptosternon is distinguished by having the combination of an interrupted groove behind the lip (post-labial groove), the gill openings extending onto the underside (venter), homodont dentition with pointed teeth in both jaws, a crescent-shaped tooth patch in the upper jaw, and 10–12 branched pectoral rays. The head is depressed with a broadly rounded snout. The body is elongate and flattened ventrally to the pelvic fins. The eyes are minute, dorsally located, and under the skin (subcutaneous). The lips are thick, fleshy, and papillated. The teeth in both jaws are pointed and the tooth patches in the upper jaw are joined, forming a band produced posteriorly at sides (crescent-shaped). The paired fins are plaited to form an adhesive apparatus.

Glyptosternon maculatum and G. reticulatum grow to between 24.0–25.5 centimetres (9.4–10.0 inches).

Glyptosternon malaisei was known only from the type, which is from the Irrawaddy drainage in Burma. A recently published study reidentifies G. malaisei as a species of Glaridoglanis, on the basis of the spatulate, homodont dentition on both jaws and the premaxillary tooth patch not extending posterolaterally; and considers it to be a junior subjective synonym of Glaridoglanis andersonii.

== Ecology ==
Glyptosternon maculatum is found in mountain rapids. G. reticulatum is found in rivers and streams under stones and rocks. It feeds mainly on invertebrates, especially insect larvae.
