= Creteuchiloglanis =

Scientific classification
- Kingdom: Animalia
- Phylum: Chordata
- Class: Actinopterygii
- Order: Siluriformes
- Superfamily: Sisoroidea
- Family: Sisoridae
- Subfamily: Glyptosterninae
- Genus: Creteuchiloglanis; W. Zhou, X. Li & A. W. Thomson, 2011

Type species
- Creteuchiloglanis longipectoralis Zhou, Li & Thomson 2011

Genus of fishes

Creteuchiloglanis is a genus of sisorid catfishes native to Asia.

== Species ==
There are currently 10 recognized species in this genus:

- Creteuchiloglanis arunachalensis Sinha & Tamang, 2014
- Creteuchiloglanis brachypterus W. Zhou, X. Li & A. W. Thomson, 2011
- Creteuchiloglanis bumdelingensis (Thoni & Gurung, 2018)
- Creteuchiloglanis gongshanensis X. L. Chu, 1981
- Creteuchiloglanis kamengensis Jayaram, 1966
- Creteuchiloglanis longipectoralis W. Zhou, X. Li & A. W. Thomson, 2011
- Creteuchiloglanis macropterus H. H. Ng, 2004
- Creteuchiloglanis nuthemuensis Sarkar, Tenali, Chandran & Singh, 2024
- Creteuchiloglanis payjab Darshan, Dutta, Kachari, Gogoi, Aran & D. N. Das, 2014
- Creteuchiloglanis tawangensis Darshan, Abujam, Wangchu, Kumar, Das & Kumar Imotomba, 2019
