= SWFC =

SWFC may refer to:

- Shanghai World Financial Center, supertall skyscraper in Pudong, Shanghai, China
- Sheffield Wednesday F.C., football club based in Sheffield, South Yorkshire, England
- Sirocco Works F.C., a football club based in Northern Ireland
- Solomon Warriors FC, a football club in the Solomon Islands
- Southwest Forestry College, in Kunming, Yunnan, China
- Southwestern Family of Companies, company based in Nashville, Tennessee
