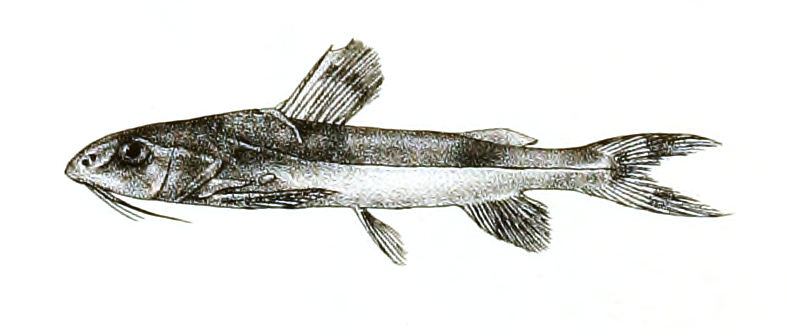
- G. viridescens

Scientific classification
- Kingdom: Animalia
- Phylum: Chordata
- Class: Actinopterygii
- Order: Siluriformes
- Family: Sisoridae
- Subfamily: Sisorinae
- Genus: Gogangra; Roberts, 2001

Type species
- Pimelodus viridescens Hamilton, 1822

Synonyms
- Gangra Roberts & Ferraris, 1998

= Gogangra =

Genus of fishes

Gogangra is a genus of sisorid catfishes native to Asia.

== Taxonomy ==
G. viridescens was previously placed in the genus Nangra. In 1998, the genus was given the name Gangra, but this name was already preoccupied by the genus Gangra of lepidopterans, so Gogangra was proposed as a replacement name in 2001. G. laevis was described in 2004.

== Species ==
There are currently two recognized species in this genus:

- Gogangra laevis Ng, 2005
- Gogangra viridescens (Hamilton, 1822)

== Distribution ==
Gogangra species are distributed in the Ganges, Meghna, and Brahmaputra drainages, India and Bangladesh. G. viridescens is known from the Ganges and Brahmaputra drainages of India and Bangladesh. It is also reported from the Indus drainage in Pakistan, Nepal, and Bhutan. G. laevis is from the Yamuna and Meghna River drainages of the lower Brahmaputra River drainage in Bangladesh.

G. viridescens is found in the upper reaches of rivers.

== Description ==
Gogangra species have a depressed head, small conical teeth in the lower jaw, the branchiostegal membranes free from isthmus, small serrations on the anterior margin of the pectoral spine (and a smooth posterior edge), no well-developed maxillary barbel membrane, the outer and inner mental barbels widely separated with the origin of inner barbels anterior to origin of outer barbels, short nasal and maxillary barbels, and palatal teeth absent. Live specimens have a viridescent or silvery supraopercular mark.

Gogangra species grow to about 8.0–8.5 centimetres (3.1–3.3 inches) in length.
