= Erethistoides cavatura =

Conservation status
- Data Deficient (IUCN 3.1)

Scientific classification
- Kingdom: Animalia
- Phylum: Chordata
- Class: Actinopterygii
- Order: Siluriformes
- Family: Sisoridae
- Genus: Erethistoides
- Species: E. cavatura

Binomial name
- Erethistoides cavatura H. H. Ng & Edds, 2005

Species of fish

Erethistoides cavatura is a species of South Asian river catfish endemic to Nepal where it is found in the Rapi River system of Narayani River basin. This species grows to a length of 3.3 centimetres (1.3 in) SL.
