= Exostoma barakense =

Conservation status
- Data Deficient (IUCN 3.1)

Scientific classification
- Kingdom: Animalia
- Phylum: Chordata
- Class: Actinopterygii
- Order: Siluriformes
- Family: Sisoridae
- Genus: Exostoma
- Species: E. barakense

Binomial name
- Exostoma barakense Vishwanath & Joyshree, 2007

Synonyms
- Exostoma barakensis

Species of fish

Exostoma barakense is a species of sisorid catfish in the family Sisoridae. It is found in India.

== Description ==
Exostoma barakense reaches a standard length of 9.8 cm (3.9 in).
