= Cycas chamaoensis =

Conservation status
- Critically Endangered (IUCN 3.1)

Scientific classification
- Kingdom: Plantae
- Clade: Tracheophytes
- Clade: Gymnospermae
- Division: Cycadophyta
- Class: Cycadopsida
- Order: Cycadales
- Family: Cycadaceae
- Genus: Cycas
- Species: C. chamaoensis

Binomial name
- Cycas chamaoensis K.D.Hill

Species of cycad

Cycas chamaoensis is named after the only known habitat of this species, on and near Khao Chamao mountain in Khao Chamao District, Thailand. Stems are arborescent, either erect or decumbent. Leaves numerous, exceeding 60 per crown, 1.2-2.5 meters in length, ending in terminal spine. Petiole 30–60 cm, glabrous and partially spiny. Leaflets in 85-155 pairs, and lanceolate, glabrous and angled forward at 60-70 degrees.

Female cones closed type, sporophylls 13–18 cm long with yellow to gray tomentose. 2-4 ovules per sporophyll. Lamina is long, almost circular, with numerous lateral spines. Sarcotesta 3 mm thick, and yellow in color, with smooth sclerotesta. Male cones solitary and erect, spindle shaped to narrow ovoid, 50–60 cm long, 12–13 cm in diameter, with orange color. Prominent apical spine present.

== Habitat ==
This cycad is native to eastern central Thailand, on Mount Khao Chamao northeast of Klaeng and southeast of Bangkok. This cycad grows from bare granite outcroppings, in full sun. It is closely related to Cycas pectinata. The conservation status is insecure, as local inhabitants treasure the plant for gardening purposes and the plant's range is restricted to only 1 mountain.
