= Exostoma tenuicaudatum =

Scientific classification
- Kingdom: Animalia
- Phylum: Chordata
- Class: Actinopterygii
- Order: Siluriformes
- Family: Sisoridae
- Genus: Exostoma
- Species: E. tenuicaudatum

Binomial name
- Exostoma tenuicaudatum Tamang, Sinha & Gurumayum, 2015

Species of catfish

Exostoma tenuicaudatum is a species of sisorid catfish in the family Sisoridae. It is found in the Siang River, in the Brahmaputra River basin in Arunachal Pradesh, India.

== Description ==
Exostoma tenuicaudatum reaches a standard length of 10.8 cm (4.3 in).
