= Erethistoides ascita =

Conservation status
- Data Deficient (IUCN 3.1)

Scientific classification
- Kingdom: Animalia
- Phylum: Chordata
- Class: Actinopterygii
- Order: Siluriformes
- Family: Sisoridae
- Genus: Erethistoides
- Species: E. ascita

Binomial name
- Erethistoides ascita H. H. Ng & Edds, 2005

Species of fish

Erethistoides ascita is a species of South Asian river catfish endemic to Nepal where it is found in the Mechi and Kosi River systems, Ganges drainage and in rivers of lowland plains of southeastern Nepal. This species grows to a length of 3.67 centimetres (1.44 in) SL.
