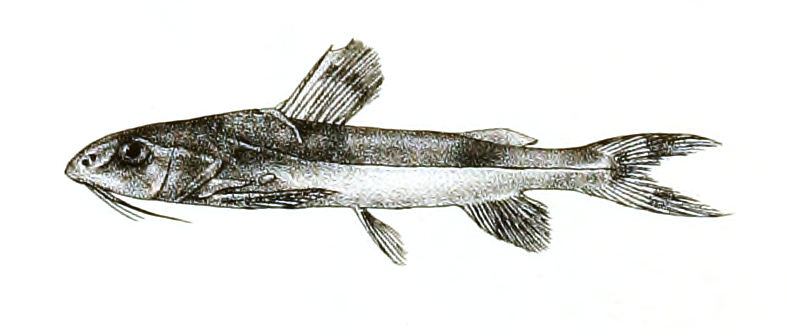

Conservation status
- Least Concern (IUCN 3.1)

Scientific classification
- Domain: Eukaryota
- Kingdom: Animalia
- Phylum: Chordata
- Class: Actinopterygii
- Order: Siluriformes
- Family: Sisoridae
- Genus: Gogangra
- Species: G. viridescens

Binomial name
- Gogangra viridescens (Hamilton, 1822)

Synonyms
- Pimelodus viridescens Hamilton, 1822; Gagata viridescens (Hamilton, 1822); Gangra viridescens (Hamilton, 1822); Nangra viridescens (Hamilton, 1822); Nangra punctata Day, 1877

= Gogangra viridescens =

Species of fish

Gogangra viridescens is a species of sisorid catfish found in Bangladesh, Bhutan, India, Nepal and Pakistan. This species grows to a length of 8.5 centimetres (3.3 in) TL.
