= Erethistoides longispinis =

Scientific classification
- Domain: Eukaryota
- Kingdom: Animalia
- Phylum: Chordata
- Class: Actinopterygii
- Order: Siluriformes
- Family: Erethistidae
- Genus: Erethistoides
- Species: E. longispinis

Binomial name
- Erethistoides longispinis H. H. Ng, Ferraris & Neely, 2012

Fish species

Erethistoides longispinis is a species of sisorid catfish in the family Erethistidae. It is found in the Irrawaddy River basin in central Myanmar.

== Description ==
Erethistoides longispinis reaches a standard length of 4.1 cm (1.6 in).
