= G. laevis =

G. laevis may refer to:

- Gogangra laevis, a fish species
- Gyraulus laevis, a freshwater snail species

== See also ==
- List of Latin and Greek words commonly used in systematic names § L
