= Exostoma laticaudatum =

Scientific classification
- Kingdom: Animalia
- Phylum: Chordata
- Class: Actinopterygii
- Order: Siluriformes
- Family: Sisoridae
- Genus: Exostoma
- Species: E. laticaudatum

Binomial name
- Exostoma laticaudatum Arunkumar, 2020

Species of sisorid catfish

Exostoma laticaudatum is a species of sisorid catfish from Manipur, India.
