= Chimarrichthys davidi =

Conservation status
- Critically Endangered (IUCN 3.1)

Scientific classification
- Kingdom: Animalia
- Phylum: Chordata
- Class: Actinopterygii
- Order: Siluriformes
- Family: Sisoridae
- Genus: Chimarrichthys
- Species: C. davidi

Binomial name
- Chimarrichthys davidi Sauvage, 1874

Synonyms
- Euchiloglanis davidi (Sauvage, 1874)

Species of fish

Chimarrichthys davidi is a species of sisorid catfish native to Asia.
