= Exostoma vinciguerrae =

Conservation status
- Data Deficient (IUCN 3.1)

Scientific classification
- Kingdom: Animalia
- Phylum: Chordata
- Class: Actinopterygii
- Order: Siluriformes
- Family: Sisoridae
- Genus: Exostoma
- Species: E. vinciguerrae

Binomial name
- Exostoma vinciguerrae Regan, 1905

Species of catfish

Exostoma vinciguerrae is a species of sisorid catfish in the family Sisoridae. It is found in Myanmar and India.

== Description ==
Exostoma vinciguerrae reaches a standard length of 3.6 cm (1.4 in).

== Etymology ==
The fish is named in honour of physician-ichthyologist Decio Vinciguerra (1856–1934).
