= Erethistoides montana =

Conservation status
- Data Deficient (IUCN 3.1)

Scientific classification
- Kingdom: Animalia
- Phylum: Chordata
- Class: Actinopterygii
- Order: Siluriformes
- Family: Sisoridae
- Genus: Erethistoides
- Species: E. montana

Binomial name
- Erethistoides montana Hora, 1950

Species of fish

Erethistoides montana is a species of South Asian river catfish endemic to India where it can be found in Tripura, Assam and Darjeeling. This species grows to a length of 4.8 centimetres (1.9 in) TL.
