= Exostoma sawmteai =

Scientific classification
- Domain: Eukaryota
- Kingdom: Animalia
- Phylum: Chordata
- Class: Actinopterygii
- Order: Siluriformes
- Family: Sisoridae
- Genus: Exostoma
- Species: E. sawmteai

Binomial name
- Exostoma sawmteai Lalramliana, Lalronunga, Lalnuntluanga & H. H. Ng, 2015

Species of catfish

Exostoma sawmteai is a species of sisorid catfish in the family Sisoridae. It is found in the Pharsih River, which is a tributary of the Tuivai River in the Barak River drainage in Mizoram, north-eastern India.

== Description ==
Exostoma sawmteai reaches a standard length of 8.5 cm (3.3 in).

== Etymology ==
The fish is named for Sawmtea Vanalalmalsawma, who as a field assistant helped collect specimens for Lalramliana.
