= Exostoma stuarti =

Conservation status
- Data Deficient (IUCN 3.1)

Scientific classification
- Kingdom: Animalia
- Phylum: Chordata
- Class: Actinopterygii
- Order: Siluriformes
- Family: Sisoridae
- Genus: Exostoma
- Species: E. stuarti

Binomial name
- Exostoma stuarti (Hora, 1923)

Synonyms
- Glyptosternum stuarti Hora, 1923

Species of sisorid catfish

Exostoma stuarti is a species of sisorid catfish in the family Sisoridae. It is found in Myanmar.

== Description ==
Exostoma stuarti reaches a standard length of 5.6 cm (2.2 in).

== Etymology ==
The fish is named after geologist Murray Stuart of the Geological Survey of India, who collected the type specimen.
