= Erethistoides sicula =

Conservation status
- Data Deficient (IUCN 3.1)

Scientific classification
- Kingdom: Animalia
- Phylum: Chordata
- Class: Actinopterygii
- Order: Siluriformes
- Family: Sisoridae
- Genus: Erethistoides
- Species: E. sicula

Binomial name
- Erethistoides sicula H. H. Ng, 2005

Species of fish

Erethistoides sicula is a species of South Asian river catfish endemic to India where it is found in the Mansai River drainage. This species is found in large, shallow, fast-flowing streams with a sandy bottom. The fish usually hide in clumps of aquatic vegetation. This species grows to a length of 3.9 centimetres (1.5 in) SL.
