= Glaridoglanis verruciloba =

Scientific classification
- Kingdom: Animalia
- Phylum: Chordata
- Class: Actinopterygii
- Order: Siluriformes
- Family: Sisoridae
- Genus: Glaridoglanis
- Species: G. verruciloba

Binomial name
- Glaridoglanis verruciloba Gong, 2025

Species of fish

Glaridoglanis verruciloba is a species of catfish (order Siluriformes) of the family Sisoridae.

== Etymology ==
The specific epithet is derived from the Latin verruca (wart) and lobus (lobe), referring to the verruciform lobes on the central-posterior margin of lower lip.

== Distribution ==
G. verruciloba inhabits the Lohit River, a tributary of the Brahmaputra River in southeastern Tibet, China. It occurs mainly in mountain streams and is less frequently found in the river mainstem.

== Description ==
G. verruciloba is diagnosed by yellow-brown sides and the belly is a pale pink, along with the front part of its front pectoral and pelvic fin rays. Its fins have yellowish edges. The species has an inferior mouth, with a gape width measuring 31.5–36.5% of the head length. Its lips are thick, fleshy, and papillate, with the upper lip covered in tiny papillae and the lower lip enlarged, featuring anastomosing rounded plaques and 4–7 irregular verruciform lobes along the central-posterior margin. The postlabial groove is interrupted, and the mental region shows a prominent median depression. Teeth are embedded in the skin, short, robust, and chisel-shaped, similar in both jaws, arranged as a single crescentic band in the upper jaw and two separate triangular patches in the lower jaw, with the palate being edentulous. Gill openings are narrow, extending from the base of the first pectoral-fin ray to just anterior and dorsal to the last pectoral-fin ray, with the posterior margin of the branchiostegal membrane forming a clear boundary between the head and thorax.

The dorsal fin lacks a spine, with i,5–6 rays. The adipose fin has a long base, located approximately midway between the pelvic and anal fins, and is separate from the upper procurrent caudal-fin rays. Pectoral and pelvic fins are enlarged and ovoid when expanded, with flattened first unbranched rays displaying ventral striae; the pelvic-fin tip does not reach the anus. The anal fin has i,5–6 rays, with a slightly concave posterior margin reaching midway between its origin and the caudal-fin base. The caudal fin is nearly truncate with i,14–15,i rays. The chest and abdomen are densely covered with minute papillae, and the anus and urogenital openings are located near the anal-fin origin.
