= Exostoma peregrinator =

Scientific classification
- Domain: Eukaryota
- Kingdom: Animalia
- Phylum: Chordata
- Class: Actinopterygii
- Order: Siluriformes
- Family: Sisoridae
- Genus: Exostoma
- Species: E. peregrinator

Binomial name
- Exostoma peregrinator H. H. Ng & Vidthayanon, 2014

Species of Actinopterygii

Exostoma peregrinator is a species of sisorid catfish in the family Sisoridae. It is found in Thailand.

== Description ==
Exostoma peregrinator reaches a standard length of 7.0 cm (2.8 in).
