= Pseudecheneis sirenica =

Conservation status
- Vulnerable (IUCN 3.1)

Scientific classification
- Kingdom: Animalia
- Phylum: Chordata
- Class: Actinopterygii
- Order: Siluriformes
- Family: Sisoridae
- Genus: Pseudecheneis
- Species: P. sirenica

Binomial name
- Pseudecheneis sirenica Vishwanath & Darshan, 2007

Species of sisorid catfish

Pseudecheneis sirenica is a species of sisorid catfish found in the Siren River of the Brahmaputra river basin in Arunachal Pradesh, India.

== Description ==
Pseudecheneis sirenica reaches a standard length of 11.0 cm (4.3 in).
