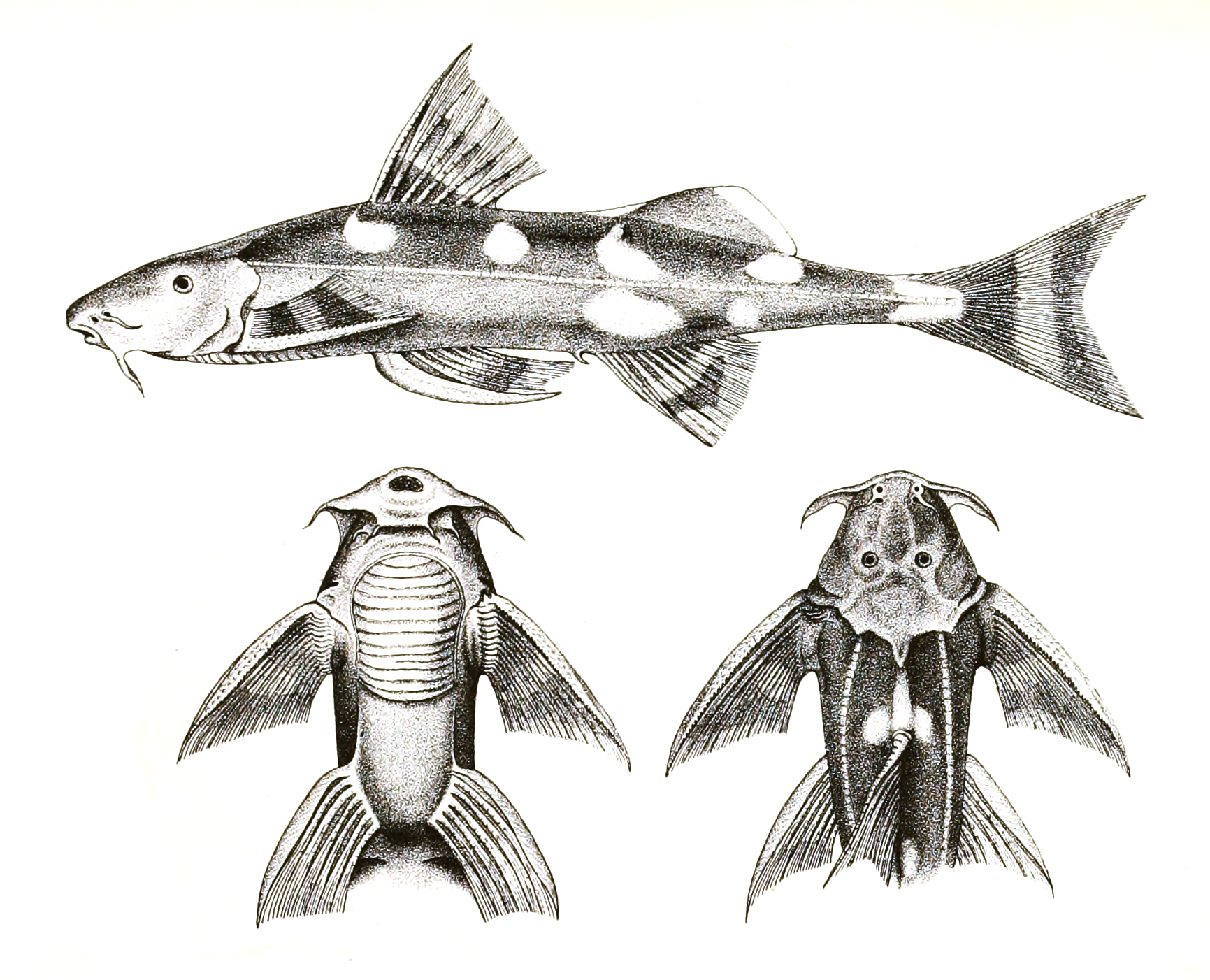
- Pseudecheneis sulcatus

Scientific classification
- Kingdom: Animalia
- Phylum: Chordata
- Class: Actinopterygii
- Order: Siluriformes
- Family: Sisoridae
- Tribe: Pseudecheneidina de Pinna, 1996
- Genus: Pseudecheneis; Blyth, 1860

Type species
- Glyptothorax sulcatus McClelland, 1842

Synonyms
- Parapseudecheneis Hora, in Hora & Chabanaud, 1930; Propseudecheneis Hora, 1937

= Pseudecheneis =

Genus of fishes

Pseudecheneis is a genus of sisorid catfishes native to Asia.

== Species ==
There are currently 20 recognized species in this genus:

- Pseudecheneis brachyura W. Zhou, X. Li & Y. Yang, 2008
- Pseudecheneis crassicauda H. H. Ng & Edds, 2005
- Pseudecheneis eddsi H. H. Ng, 2006
- Pseudecheneis gracilis W. Zhou, X. Li & Y. Yang, 2008
- Pseudecheneis immaculata X. L. Chu, 1982
- Pseudecheneis koladynae Anganthoibi & Vishwanath, 2010
- Pseudecheneis longipectoralis W. Zhou, X. Li & Y. Yang, 2008
- Pseudecheneis maurus H. H. Ng & H. H. Tan, 2007
- Pseudecheneis nagalandensis Shangningam & Kosygin, 2020
- Pseudecheneis paucipunctata W. Zhou, X. Li & Y. Yang, 2008
- Pseudecheneis paviei Vaillant, 1892
- Pseudecheneis serracula H. H. Ng & Edds, 2005
- Pseudecheneis sirenica Vishwanath & Darshan, 2007
- Pseudecheneis stenura H. H. Ng, 2006
- Pseudecheneis sulcata (McClelland, 1842) (Sucker throat catfish)
- Pseudecheneis sulcatoides W. Zhou & X. L. Chu, 1992
- Pseudecheneis suppaetula H. H. Ng, 2006
- Pseudecheneis sympelvica T. R. Roberts, 1998
- Pseudecheneis tchangi (Hora, 1937)
- Pseudecheneis ukhrulensis Vishwanath & Darshan, 2007

== Distribution ==
Pseudecheneis species are rheophilic fish that occur in the headwaters of major river drainages throughout South and Southeast Asia. They are found in the upper reaches of rivers throughout the Subhimalayan and Indochinese region. They are distributed in the Ganges and Brahmaputra drainages of northern India and Nepal and eastwards to the Ailao Mountains along the upper Red River drainage of Vietnam and the Annamese Cordillera. P. maurus represents the first record of the genus on the rivers draining to the eastern face of the Annamese Cordillera.

== Description ==
Pseudecheneis species are easily distinguished among sisorids in having a thoracic adhesive apparatus consisting of a series of transverse ridges (laminae) separated by grooves (sulcae). The dorsal and pectoral fins have one spine each. The head is short and anteriorly depressed with a sharp snout and small mouth. The lips are thick, fleshy, and papillate. The body is elongate, from moderately to greatly depressed. The eyes are small and dorsally-located. The skin is smooth. Mouth small. The maxillary barbels are very short. The mandibular barbels are papillate. The gill openings are narrow. Paired fins are plaited to form an adhesive apparatus.
