= Parachiloglanis =

Scientific classification
- Kingdom: Animalia
- Phylum: Chordata
- Class: Actinopterygii
- Order: Siluriformes
- Family: Sisoridae
- Tribe: Glyptosternina
- Genus: Parachiloglanis; X. W. Wu, M. J. He & X. L. Chu, 1981

Type species
- Glyptosternum hodgarti Hora, 1923

Genus of fishes

Parachiloglanis is a genus of catfish of the family Sisoridae.

== Species ==
There are currently 6 recognized species in this genus:

- Parachiloglanis benjii Thoni & Gurung, 2018
- Parachiloglanis bhutanensis Thoni & Gurung, 2014 (Khaling torrent catfish)
- Parachiloglanis dangmechhuensis Thoni & Gurung, 2018
- Parachiloglanis drukyulensis Thoni & Gurung, 2018
- Parachiloglanis hodgarti (Hora, 1923)
- Parachiloglanis immaculatus Chen & He, 2024
