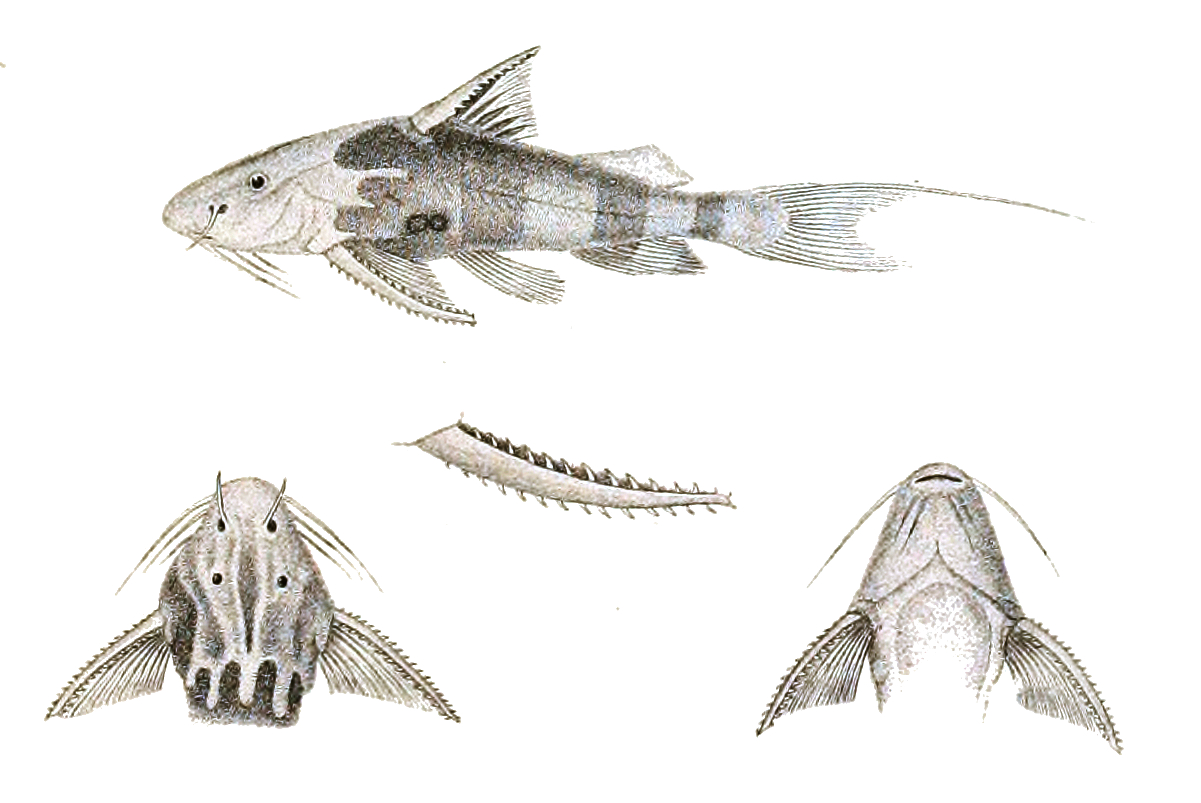

Conservation status
- Data Deficient (IUCN 3.1)

Scientific classification
- Kingdom: Animalia
- Phylum: Chordata
- Class: Actinopterygii
- Order: Siluriformes
- Family: Sisoridae
- Genus: Conta
- Species: C. conta

Binomial name
- Conta conta (F. Hamilton, 1822)

Synonyms
- Pimelodus conta Hamilton, 1822; Hara conta (Hamilton, 1822); Hara elongata Day, 1872; Conta elongata (Day, 1872); Erethistes elongata (Day, 1872)

= Conta conta =

Species of fish

Conta conta, the Conta catfish, is a species of South Asian river catfish. This species grows to a length of 7.8 centimetres (3.1 in) TL.

== Distribution and habitat ==
C. conta is distributed in the Ganges and Brahmaputra drainages, India and Bangladesh. C. conta is also listed to originate from Bhareli and Mahananda Rivers, northeast Bengal, Garo Hills, Meghalaya; and Bangladesh; and also Sarda River, Uttar Pradesh. This species occurs in rocky streams at the bases of hills.
