= Myersglanis =

Scientific classification
- Kingdom: Animalia
- Phylum: Chordata
- Class: Actinopterygii
- Order: Siluriformes
- Family: Sisoridae
- Tribe: Glyptosternina
- Genus: Myersglanis; Hora & Silas, 1952

Type species
- Exostoma blythii F. Day, 1870

Genus of fishes

Myersglanis is a genus of sisorid catfishes native to Asia.

== Species ==
There are currently two recognized species in this genus:

- Myersglanis blythii (F. Day, 1870) (Stone cat)
- Myersglanis jayarami Vishwanath & Kosygin, 1999

== Distribution and habitat ==
Myersglanis originates from the Ganges and Irrawaddy drainages in India and Nepal. M. blythii inhabits the Ganges drainage in Nepal and possibly from Pharping, Nepal. M. jayarami lives in the Irrawaddy drainage in India; it is found in the Lainye River of the Chindwin River basin in this drainage.

M. blythii occurs in streams and is common in hill streams; it is also found in mountain rapids.

== Description ==
Myersglanis species can be distinguished by the presence of a continuous groove behind the lips (post-labial groove), the gill openings not extending onto the underside (venter), homodont dentition with pointed teeth in both jaws, the tooth patches in upper jaw joined and not produced posteriorly at the sides, and 10 or 16–19 branched pectoral rays. The head is depressed. The body is elongate and depressed anteriorly. The eyes are minute, dorsally located, and under the skin. The lips are thick, fleshy, and papillated.

M. blythii grows to a length of about 7.3 centimetres (2.9 in) TL.
