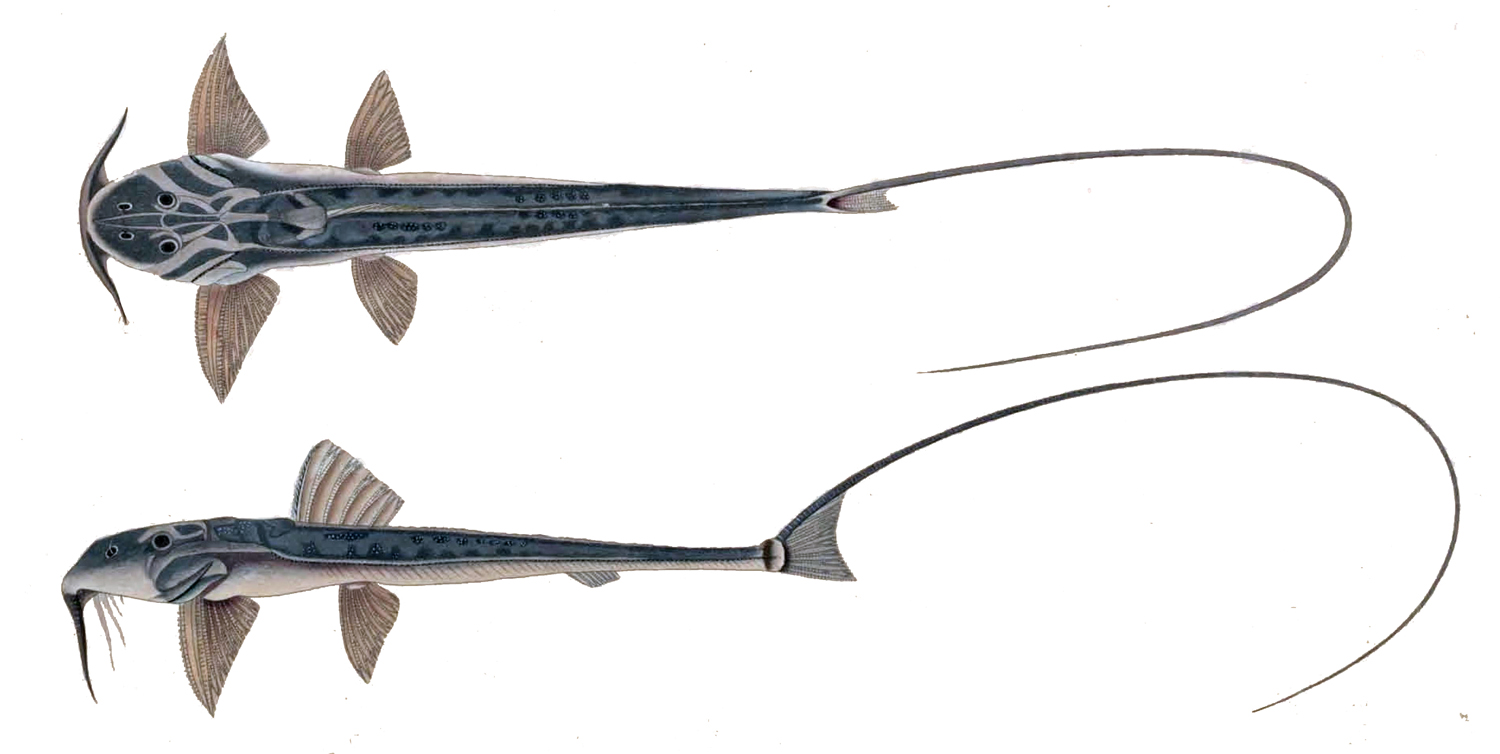
- Sisor rabdophorus

Scientific classification
- Kingdom: Animalia
- Phylum: Chordata
- Class: Actinopterygii
- Order: Siluriformes
- Family: Sisoridae
- Subfamily: Sisorinae
- Genus: Sisor; Hamilton, 1822

Type species
- Sisor rabdophorus Hamilton, 1822

= Sisor =

Genus of fishes

Sisor is a genus of catfishes native to Asia.

== Taxonomy ==
Sisor was previously monotypic, containing only S. rabdophorus, prior to a review of the genus in 2003 in which the three species S. chennuah, S. rheophilus, and S. torosus were described. S. barakensis was described in 2005.

S. rabdophorus is sometimes spelled S. rhabdophorus; this is meant to correct the misspelling of the Greek word rhabdos meaning rod. However, this is not a valid emendation.

== Species ==
There are currently six recognized species in this genus:

- Sisor barakensis Vishwanath & Darshan, 2005
- Sisor chennuah Ng & Lahkar, 2003
- Sisor pakistanicus Javed & Mirza, 2011
- Sisor rabdophorus Hamilton, 1822
- Sisor rheophilus Ng, 2003
- Sisor torosus Ng, 2003

== Distribution and habitat ==
Sisor species are distributed in the Ganges and Brahmaputra drainages in India. S. barakensis originates from the Barak River of the Brahmaputra drainage in India. S. chennuah inhabits the Brahmaputra drainage in Assam State, India. S. rabdophorus originates from the Ganges drainage, West Bengal States, India. S. rheophilus originates from the Ganges drainage, Bihar and Uttar Pradesh States, India. S. torosus lives in the Ganges drainage, Bihar and Delhi States, India. The identities of Sisor specimens from the Indus River, Rohini River at Madhopur, and Nepal have not yet been confirmed.

S. rheophilus has been found in fast-moving rivers with sandy bottoms. S. rabdophorus also inhabits streams with sandy bottoms and strong currents.

== Description ==
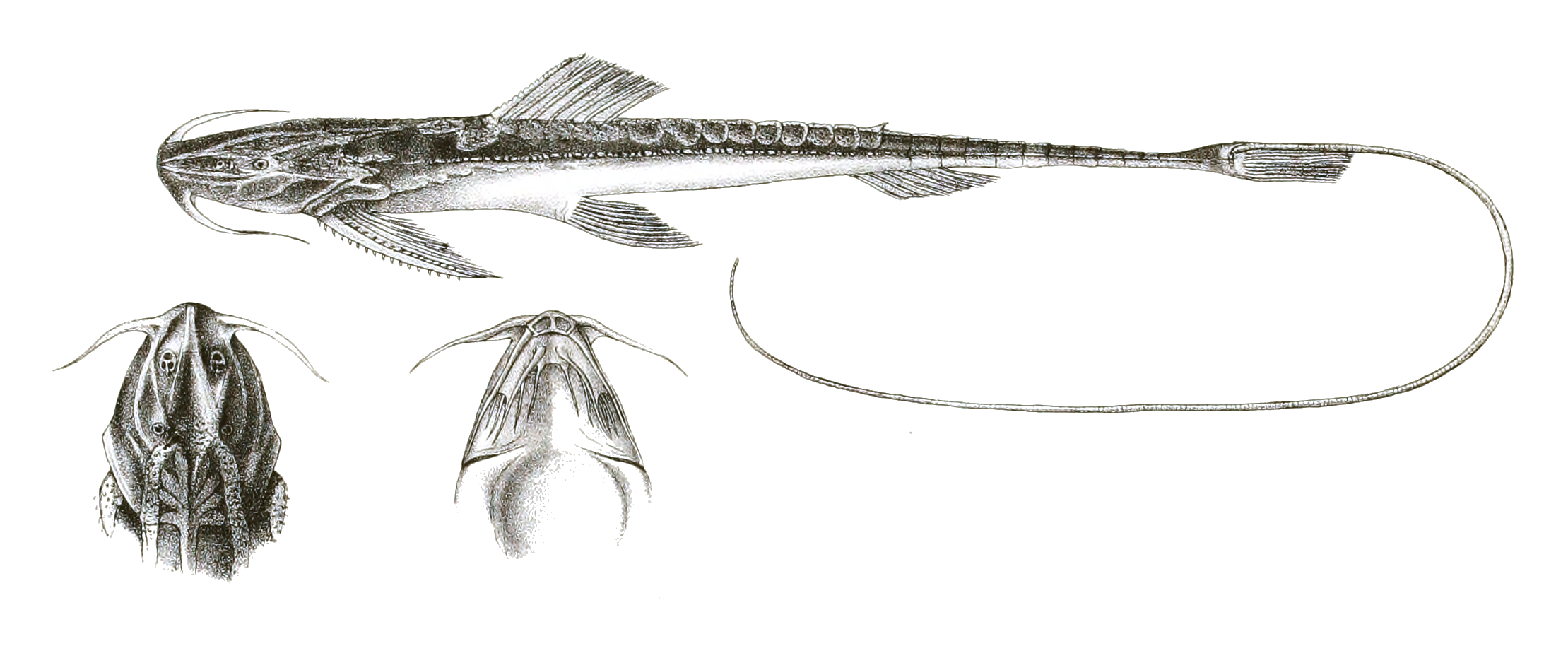
Illustration

Sisor is distinguished from all other erethistids and sisorids by the presence of a series of bony plates extending from the dorsal fin to the base of the caudal fin and a spine in adipose fin. Also, the uppermost caudal-fin ray is more than half length of body, the branchiostegal membranes are broadly fused to isthmus, the outer and inner mental barbels are widely separated with the origin of outer barbels anterior to origin of inner barbels, the lower jaw teeth are minute, dentition essentially consisting of roughened plate, large serrations on the anterior margin of the pectoral spine (also serrated posteriorly), a well-developed maxillary barbel membrane, and palatal teeth absent. The head is moderately narrow and strongly depressed. The body is extremely narrow and strongly depressed. The eyes are small, dorsolaterally located, and under the skin (subcutaneous). The maxillary barbels do not extend beyond the head. The dorsal fin spine is serrate anteriorly and smooth posteriorly.

S. chennua, S. rheophilus, and S. torosus grow to about 9.5–11.6 centimetres (3.7–4.6 inches) SL. S. rabdophorus attains a length of about 18.0 cm (7.1 in) SL.
