= Discogobio laticeps =

Scientific classification
- Kingdom: Animalia
- Phylum: Chordata
- Class: Actinopterygii
- Order: Cypriniformes
- Family: Cyprinidae
- Subfamily: Labeoninae
- Genus: Discogobio
- Species: D. laticeps

Binomial name
- Discogobio laticeps Chu, Cui, & Zhou, 1993

Species of fish

Discogobio laticeps is a fish species in the genus Discogobio endemic to southern China.
