= Conta (surname) =

Conta is a surname. Notable people with the surname include:

- Dennis Conta (born 1940), American politician and consultant
- Giancarlo Conta (born 1949), Italian politician
- Richard von Conta (1856–1941), German WWI general
- Vasile Conta (1845–1882), Romanian philosopher, poet, and politician
- Vladimir Conta (born 1954), Romanian conductor and pianist

== See also ==
- Ana Conta-Kernbach (1865–1921), Romanian educator and activist
- Conta (disambiguation)
