= Erethistoides =

Scientific classification
- Domain: Eukaryota
- Kingdom: Animalia
- Phylum: Chordata
- Class: Actinopterygii
- Order: Siluriformes
- Family: Erethistidae
- Genus: Erethistoides; Hora, 1950

Type species
- Erethistoides montana Hora, 1950

Genus of fishes

Erethistoides is a genus of South Asian river catfishes.

== Species ==
There are currently 10 recognized species in this genus:

- Erethistoides ascita H. H. Ng & Edds, 2005
- Erethistoides cavatura H. H. Ng & Edds, 2005
- Erethistoides infuscatus H. H. Ng, 2006
- Erethistoides longispinis H. H. Ng, Ferraris & Neely, 2012
- Erethistoides luteolus H. H. Ng, Ferraris & Neely, 2012
- Erethistoides montana Hora, 1950
- Erethistoides pipri Hora, 1950
- Erethistoides senkhiensis Tamang, Chaudhry & Choudhury, 2008
- Erethistoides sicula H. H. Ng, 2005
- Erethistoides vesculus H. H. Ng, Ferraris & Neely, 2012

== Distribution and habitat ==
This genus is known from the sub-Himalayan region of the Indian subcontinent. They are found in the Brahmaputra and Meghna drainages, northern India and Nepal.

== Description ==
Erethistoides is distinguished from all other erethistids by having the anterior margin of the pectoral fin spine with serrations directed toward the tip of the spine distally, and away from the tip proximally; however, the use of this as a diagnostic character has been questioned as some specimens of Erethistes filamentosa also show this trait. They also lack a thoracic adhesive apparatus present in some other erethistids, and a smooth to granulate anterior margin on the dorsal fin spine, moderate gill openings that extend to the underside of the fish, a papillate upper lip, and 9–11 anal fin rays. The head is depressed and triangular, and the body is elongate and compressed. The eyes are small to moderate and are placed dorsolaterally in the posterior half of the head. The pectoral fin spine is serrated anteriorly and posteriorly. The dorsal fin spine is serrated posteriorly but not anteriorly.
