= Gogangra laevis =

Conservation status
- Data Deficient (IUCN 3.1)

Scientific classification
- Domain: Eukaryota
- Kingdom: Animalia
- Phylum: Chordata
- Class: Actinopterygii
- Order: Siluriformes
- Family: Sisoridae
- Genus: Gogangra
- Species: G. laevis

Binomial name
- Gogangra laevis Ng, 2005

Species of fish

Gogangra laevis is a species of sisorid catfish found in Bangladesh where it occurs in the Jamuna and Meghna River drainages. This species grows to a length of 8 centimetres (3.1 in) SL.
