= Glaridoglanis =

Scientific classification
- Kingdom: Animalia
- Phylum: Chordata
- Class: Actinopterygii
- Order: Siluriformes
- Family: Sisoridae
- Subfamily: Glyptosterninae
- Genus: Glaridoglanis; Norman, 1925

Type species
- Glaridoglanis andersonii F. Day, 1870

Genus of fishes

Glaridoglanis is a genus of sisorid catfishes native to Asia.

== Species ==
There are currently three recognized species in this genus:

- Glaridoglanis andersonii Day, 1870
- Glaridoglanis ramosa Ng & Kottelat, 2022
- Glaridoglanis verruciloba Gong, 2025
