= Chimarrichthys =

Scientific classification
- Kingdom: Animalia
- Phylum: Chordata
- Class: Actinopterygii
- Division: Teleostei
- Order: Siluriformes
- Family: Sisoridae
- Subfamily: Glyptosterninae
- Genus: Chimarrichthys; Sauvage, 1874

Synonyms
- Euchiloglanis

Genus of fishes

Chimarrichthys is a genus of fish in the family Sisoridae endemic to China.

== Species ==
These are the valid species within the genus:

- Chimarrichthys davidi Sauvage, 1874
- Chimarrichthys kishinouyei (Kimura, 1934)
- Chimarrichthys longibarbatus (Zhou, Li & Thomson, 2011)
- Chimarrichthys longus (W. Zhou, X. Li & A. W. Thomson, 2011)
- Chimarrichthys nami (Tran, Nguyen, Dang, Nguyen & Nguyen, 2023)
