= Conta pectinata =

Conservation status
- Data Deficient (IUCN 3.1)

Scientific classification
- Kingdom: Animalia
- Phylum: Chordata
- Class: Actinopterygii
- Order: Siluriformes
- Family: Sisoridae
- Genus: Conta
- Species: C. pectinata

Binomial name
- Conta pectinata H. H. Ng, 2005

Species of fish

Conta pectinata is a species of South Asian river catfish endemic to India where it occurs the Brahmaputra River drainage of Assam. This species grows to a length of 4.91 centimetres (1.93 in) SL.
