= Ayarnangra =

Conservation status
- Data Deficient (IUCN 3.1)

Scientific classification
- Kingdom: Animalia
- Phylum: Chordata
- Class: Actinopterygii
- Order: Siluriformes
- Family: Sisoridae
- Genus: Ayarnangra; T. R. Roberts, 2001
- Species: A. estuarius

Binomial name
- Ayarnangra estuarius T. R. Roberts, 2001

Species of fish

Ayarnangra estuarius is a species of catfish (order Siluriformes) of the family Erethistidae. It is the only member of the monotypic genus Ayarnangra.

A. estuarius is endemic to Myanmar where it is found in the large tidal rivers in the lower Ayeyarwady River. This species feeds on comparatively large invertebrates.

A. estuarius has no thoracic adhesive apparatus, a granulate anterior margin of the pectoral fin spine, a smooth to granulate anterior margin of the dorsal fin spine, a slender body shape, moderate gill openings, and a papillate upper lip. The eyes are very small, and the nostrils are much larger than the eyes. This species of fish reaches a length of 4.59 centimetres (1.81 in) SL.
