= Discogobio bismargaritus =

Scientific classification
- Kingdom: Animalia
- Phylum: Chordata
- Class: Actinopterygii
- Order: Cypriniformes
- Family: Cyprinidae
- Subfamily: Labeoninae
- Genus: Discogobio
- Species: D. bismargaritus

Binomial name
- Discogobio bismargaritus Chu, Cui, & Zhou, 1993

Species of fish

Discogobio bismargaritus is a species of cyprinid fish in the subfamily Labeoninae. It is endemic to Yunnan province in China. It lives in torrential waters and uses its mouth sucking disc to cling to the substratum. It can grow to 13.8 cm (5.4 in) total length.
