= Glaridoglanis andersonii =

Conservation status
- Data Deficient (IUCN 3.1)

Scientific classification
- Kingdom: Animalia
- Phylum: Chordata
- Class: Actinopterygii
- Order: Siluriformes
- Family: Sisoridae
- Genus: Glaridoglanis; Norman, 1925
- Species: G. andersonii

Binomial name
- Glaridoglanis andersonii (F. Day, 1870)

Synonyms
- Exostoma andersonii Day, 1870; Glyptosternon malaisei Rendahl & Vestergren, 1941

Species of fish

Glaridoglanis andersonii is a species of catfish (order Siluriformes) of the family Sisoridae.

== Distribution ==
G. andersonii inhabits the Irrawaddy drainage, Myanmar and China. It has also been recorded from the Brahmaputra drainage in China.

== Description ==
G. andersonii is diagnosed by an interrupted post-labial groove, gill openings not extending to the underside, homodont dentition, strong and distally-flattened teeth in both jaws, slightly crescent-shaped tooth patch in upper jaw, and 10–11 branched pectoral fin rays. This fish species has a depressed head. The body is elongate, and it is flattened on the underside. The eyes are small and dorsally located. The teeth are flattened, strong, and blunt. The gill openings are narrow, not extending below the pectoral fin base. The paired fins are plaited to form an adhesive apparatus.

== Etymology ==
The fish is named in honor of John Anderson (1833–1900), Scottish zoologist and anatomist, who gave the holotype to the Calcutta Museum.
