= Discogobio longibarbatus =

Scientific classification
- Kingdom: Animalia
- Phylum: Chordata
- Class: Actinopterygii
- Order: Cypriniformes
- Family: Cyprinidae
- Subfamily: Labeoninae
- Genus: Discogobio
- Species: D. longibarbatus

Binomial name
- Discogobio longibarbatus Wu, 1977

Species of fish

Discogobio longibarbatus is a fish species in the subfamily Labeoninae. It is endemic to Fuxian Lake in Yunnan, China.
