= Discogobio microstoma =

Conservation status
- Data Deficient (IUCN 3.1)

Scientific classification
- Kingdom: Animalia
- Phylum: Chordata
- Class: Actinopterygii
- Order: Cypriniformes
- Family: Cyprinidae
- Subfamily: Labeoninae
- Genus: Discogobio
- Species: D. microstoma

Binomial name
- Discogobio microstoma (Mai, 1978)

Synonyms
- Garra microstoma

Species of fish

Discogobio microstoma is a cyprinid fish species in the subfamily Labeoninae. It is endemic to northern Vietnam.
