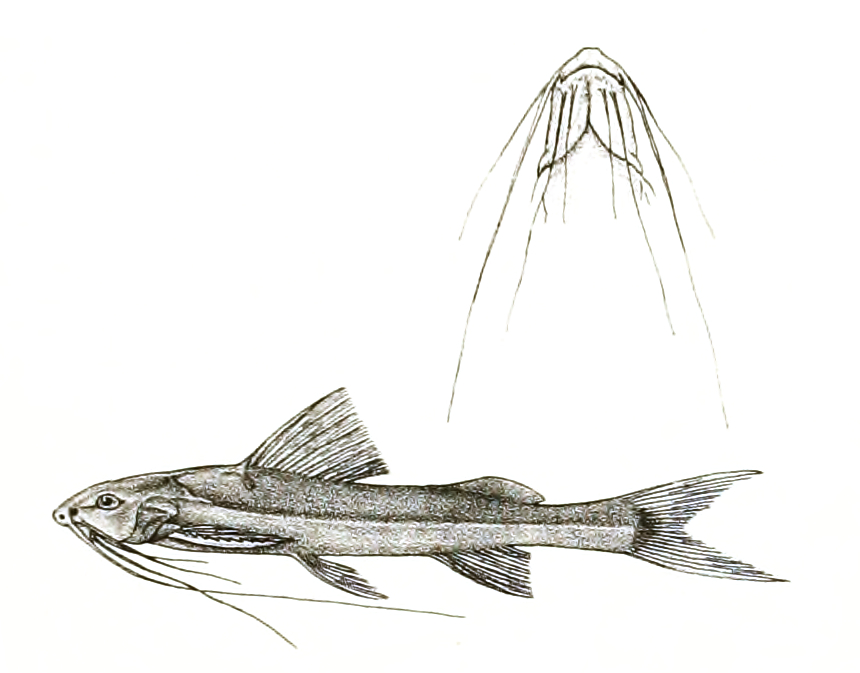
- Nangra nangra

Scientific classification
- Kingdom: Animalia
- Phylum: Chordata
- Class: Actinopterygii
- Order: Siluriformes
- Family: Sisoridae
- Subfamily: Sisorinae
- Genus: Nangra; Day, 1877

Type species
- Pimelodus nangra Hamilton, 1822

= Nangra =

Genus of fishes

Nangra is a genus of sisorid catfishes native to Asia.

== Species ==
There are currently five recognized species in this genus:

- Nangra assamensis Sen & B. K. Biswas, 1994
- Nangra bucculenta Roberts & Ferraris, 1998
- Nangra nangra (Hamilton, 1822)
- Nangra ornata Roberts & Ferraris, 1998
- Nangra robusta Mirza & Awan, 1973

== Distribution ==
Nangra species are distributed in the Indus, Ganges, Meghna, and Bramhputra drainages in Pakistan, India, Bangladesh, and Nepal. N. assamensis inhabits the Ganges and Brahmaputra drainages in India. N. bucculenta originates from the Ganges drainage in Bangladesh. N. nangra is known from the Indus, Ganges and Bramhputra drainages in Pakistan, India, Bangladesh and Nepal. N. ornata lives in the Meghna drainage in Bangladesh. N. robusta is from the Indus drainage in Pakistan.

== Description ==
Nangra is distinguished from all sisorids by having maxillary barbels that extend beyond the base of the pectoral fin (vs. extending no further than the pectoral-fin base), by having very long nasal barbels in which the barbel length is much greater than the eye diameter and often as long as the head (vs. length less than the eye diameter), and by having palatal teeth. Nangra species have a depressed head, dorsolateral eyes, an elongated snout, small conical teeth in the lower jaw, branchiostegal membranes free from the isthmus, no serrations on anterior margin of pectoral spine (but serrate posteriorly), and a well-developed maxillary barbel membrane.

N. bucculenta grows to about 3.4 centimetres (1.3 in) SL. N. nangra grows to about 5.5 cm (2.2 in) TL. N. ornata grows to about 3.7 cm (1.5 in) SL. N. robusta grows to about 10.0 cm (3.9 in) SL.
