= Chimarrichthys kishinouyei =

Conservation status
- Endangered (IUCN 3.1)

Scientific classification
- Kingdom: Animalia
- Phylum: Chordata
- Class: Actinopterygii
- Order: Siluriformes
- Family: Sisoridae
- Genus: Chimarrichthys
- Species: C. kishinouyei

Binomial name
- Chimarrichthys kishinouyei (Sh. Kimura, 1934)

Synonyms
- Euchiloglanis kishinouyei Kimura, 1934

Species of fish

Chimarrichthys kishinouyei is a species of sisorid catfish native to Asia.

== Distribution ==
C. kishinouyei inhabits the Yangtze drainage, China. It has also been reported from the Brahmaputra drainage in India and the Ganges drainage in Nepal. It is also listed as originating from Chinijiang, Sichuan; eastern Tibet; and Jinshajiang located at the upper Yangtze River basin.

== Description ==
C. kishinouyei is diagnosed by an interrupted post-labial groove, gill openings not extending to the underside, homodont dentition, pointed teeth in both jaws, tooth patches in upper jaw joined into crescent-shaped band, and 12–14 branched pectoral fin rays. This fish species has a depressed head with a broadly rounded snout. The body is elongate, and it is flattened on the underside to the pelvic fins. The eyes are small, dorsally located, and subcutaneous (under the skin). The lips are thick, fleshy, and papillated, and a post-labial groove behind the lips is broadly interrupted at the middle. The gill openings are narrow, not extending below the pectoral fin base. The paired fins are plaited to form an adhesive apparatus.
