= Discogobio yunnanensis =

Conservation status
- Least Concern (IUCN 3.1)

Scientific classification
- Kingdom: Animalia
- Phylum: Chordata
- Class: Actinopterygii
- Order: Cypriniformes
- Family: Cyprinidae
- Subfamily: Labeoninae
- Genus: Discogobio
- Species: D. yunnanensis

Binomial name
- Discogobio yunnanensis (Regan, 1907)

Synonyms
- Discognathus yunnanensis

Species of fish

Discogobio yunnanensis is a species of cyprinid fish in the subfamily Labeoninae. It is endemic to upper and middle reaches of the Yangtze and some of its drainages in China.
