= Parachiloglanis hodgarti =

Conservation status
- Least Concern (IUCN 3.1)

Scientific classification
- Kingdom: Animalia
- Phylum: Chordata
- Class: Actinopterygii
- Order: Siluriformes
- Family: Sisoridae
- Genus: Parachiloglanis
- Species: P. hodgarti

Binomial name
- Parachiloglanis hodgarti (Hora, 1923)

Synonyms
- Glyptosternum hodgarti Hora, 1923

Species of fish

Parachiloglanis hodgarti, the torrent catfish, is a species of catfish of the family Sisoridae.

== Distribution ==
P. hodgarti inhabits the Ganges and Brahmaputra drainages in India, Bangladesh, Nepal, and China. It has also been listed from Abor Hills, Meghalaya, Darjeeling, Kali River, Teesta valley and Nepal.

== Description ==
P. hodgarti is diagnosed by having no post-labial groove (unlike other members of Glyptosternina), gill openings not extending to the underside, homodont dentition, pointed teeth in both jaws, tooth patches joined into a crescent-shaped band in upper jaw, and 13–16 branched pectoral fin rays. This fish species has a depressed head. The body is elongate, and it is depressed anteriorly. The skin is smooth dorsally but often tuberculate on the underside of the body. The lips are thick, fleshy, and papillated. The eyes are minute, dorsally located, and subcutaneous (under the skin). The gill openings are narrow, not extending below the pectoral fin base. The paired fins are plaited to form an adhesive apparatus. This species grows to a length of 6.5 centimetres (2.6 in) TL.
