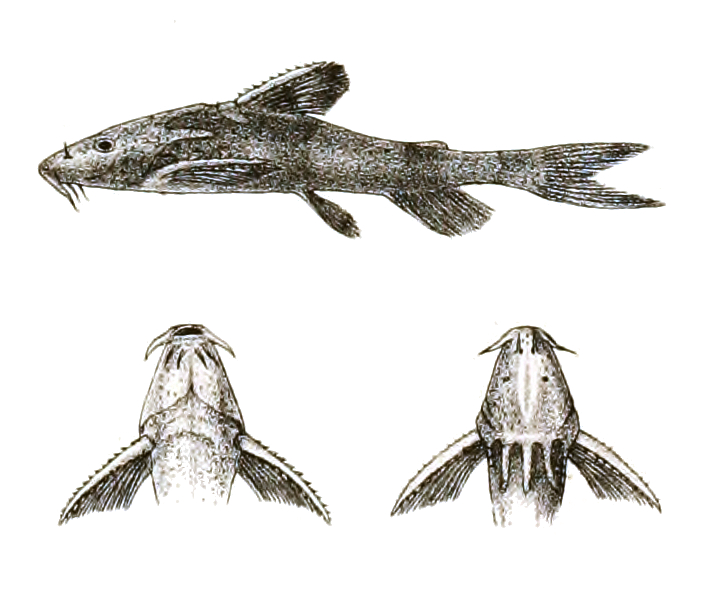
- Conta

Scientific classification
- Kingdom: Animalia
- Phylum: Chordata
- Class: Actinopterygii
- Order: Siluriformes
- Family: Sisoridae
- Subfamily: Sisorinae
- Genus: Conta; Hora, 1950

Type species
- Pimelodus conta F. Hamilton

= Conta =

Genus of fishes

Conta is a small genus of South Asian river catfishes native to India and Bangladesh.

== Description ==
Conta can be distinguished from all other erethistids by the presence of a very long and narrow adhesive apparatus on its thorax about six times as it is long. It also has extremely narrow gill openings, a slender body, a serrated anterior margin on the dorsal fin spine, a papillate upper lip, and 9–10 anal fin rays. The eyes are small and located dorsolaterally. There is villiform (brush-like) teeth in both jaws. The pectoral fin spine is serrated anteriorly and posteriorly.

Conta pectinata differs from Conta conta in that it has a longer and more slender caudal peduncle and in having anteriorly-directed serrations (instead of antrorse or distally-directed serrations) the anterior edge of the pectoral fin spine.
