= Discogobio brachyphysallidos =

Scientific classification
- Domain: Eukaryota
- Kingdom: Animalia
- Phylum: Chordata
- Class: Actinopterygii
- Order: Cypriniformes
- Family: Cyprinidae
- Subfamily: Labeoninae
- Genus: Discogobio
- Species: D. brachyphysallidos

Binomial name
- Discogobio brachyphysallidos Huang, 1989

Synonyms
- Discogobio branchyphysalloides

Species of fish

Discogobio brachyphysallidos is a fish species in the genus Discogobio endemic to China.
