= Konti =

Konti may refer to:

- Konti Group, a Ukrainian confectionery manufacturer company based in Donetsk
- Isidore Konti, Vienna-born (of Hungarian parents) sculptor

== See also ==
- Konte (disambiguation)
- Conti
