= Exostoma =

Scientific classification
- Kingdom: Animalia
- Phylum: Chordata
- Class: Actinopterygii
- Order: Siluriformes
- Family: Sisoridae
- Subfamily: Glyptosterninae
- Genus: Exostoma; Blyth, 1860

Type species
- Exostoma berdmorei Blyth, 1860

Genus of fishes

Exostoma is a genus of sisorid catfishes native to Asia. These species are distributed in the Brahmaputra drainage of north-eastern India, and east and south to the Salween drainages in Burma. E. berdmorei is found in the Sittang and Salween drainages in Burma. E. labiatum is known from the Brahmaputra drainage in north-eastern India, but has also been recorded in the Salween drainage in Burma, the Ayeyarwady drainage in China, and the Brahmaputra drainage in Tibet and Burma. E. stuarti is from the Ayeyarwady River of Burma and India; however, it has not been collected since its original discovery. E. labiatum is found in mountain rapids.

In a 2007 checklist of sisorid and erethistid catfishes, Thomson lists E. stuarti and E. vinciguerrae as valid species. In a 2007 checklist of catfishes, Ferraris lists these two species as species inquerendae, noting that these species are either treated as valid or as synonyms of E. labiatum.

== Species ==
The following species are currently recognized in the genus Exostoma:

- Exostoma barakense Vishwanath & Joyshree, 2007
- Exostoma berdmorei Blyth, 1860
- Exostoma chaudhurii (Hora, 1923)
- Exostoma dhritiae Singh, Kosygin, Gurumayum & Rath, 2022
- Exostoma dujangense Shangningam & Kosygin, 2020
- Exostoma dulongense Luo & Chen, 2020
- Exostoma effrenum H. H. Ng & Vidthayanon, 2014
- Exostoma ericinum Ng, 2018
- Exostoma gaoligongense Chen, Poly, Catania & Jiang, 2017 (Gaoligong mountain catfish)
- Exostoma kottelati Darshan, Vishwanath, Abujam & Das, 2019
- Exostoma labiatum (McClelland, 1842) (Burmese Bat Catfish)
- Exostoma laticaudatum Arunkumar, 2020
- Exostoma mangdechhuense Thoni & Gurung, 2018
- Exostoma microadiposa Chen, Tan & He, 2025
- Exostoma peregrinator H. H. Ng & Vidthayanon, 2014
- Exostoma sawmteai Lalramliana, Lalronunga, Lalnuntluanga & H. H. Ng, 2015
- Exostoma sectile Ng & Kottelat, 2018
- Exostoma sentiyonoae Shangningam & Limatemjen, 2024
- Exostoma stuarti (Hora, 1923)
- Exostoma tenuicaudatum Tamang, Sinha & Gurumayum, 2015
- Exostoma tibetanum Gong, Lin, Liu & Liu, 2018
- Exostoma vinciguerrae Regan, 1905

== Description ==
Exostoma is distinguished by having a continuous groove behind the lips (post-labial groove), the gill openings not extending onto the underside (venter), homodont dentition of oar-shaped, distally flattened teeth in both jaws, the tooth patches separated in upper jaw, and 10–11 branched pectoral rays. The head is depressed with a broadly rounded snout. The body is elongate and flattened ventrally to the pelvic fins. The eyes are minute, dorsally located, and under the skin (subcutaneous). The lips are thick, fleshy, and papillated. The teeth are small to large, moveable, oar-shaped, flattened distally and directed posteriorly in distinct patches.

E. stuarti is recorded to grow to 5.6 centimetres (2.2 in) SL. E. berdmorei and E. labiatum grow to about 10–11 cm (3.9–4.3 in) TL.
