= Konte =

Konte, or Konté, may refer to:

- Amadou Konte (born 1981), Malian-French footballer
- Bai Konte (1920-1983), Gambia praise singer
- Bassirou Konté (born 1988), Ivorian cyclist
- Dembo Konte (died 2014), West African master kora player
- Mamadou Konte (died 2007), Senegalese music producer
- Skip Konte (born 1947), American keyboardist

== See also ==
- Konti (disambiguation)
