= Discogobio tetrabarbatus =

Conservation status
- Least Concern (IUCN 3.1)

Scientific classification
- Kingdom: Animalia
- Phylum: Chordata
- Class: Actinopterygii
- Order: Cypriniformes
- Family: Cyprinidae
- Subfamily: Labeoninae
- Genus: Discogobio
- Species: D. tetrabarbatus

Binomial name
- Discogobio tetrabarbatus Lin, 1931

Species of fish

Discogobio tetrabarbatus is a fish species in the genus Discogobio endemic to sections of the Pearl River in China.
