= Pseudexostoma =

Scientific classification
- Kingdom: Animalia
- Phylum: Chordata
- Class: Actinopterygii
- Order: Siluriformes
- Family: Sisoridae
- Tribe: Glyptosternina
- Genus: Pseudexostoma; X. L. Chu, 1979

Type species
- Glyptosternum yunnanensis Tchang, 1935

Genus of fishes

Pseudexostoma is a genus of fish in the family Sisoridae endemic to China. These species are restricted to the upper Salween (Nujiang River) and one upper branch of the Irrawaddy (Dayinjiang River) in China. P. brachysoma is known only from the middle and lower Nujiang River. P. yunnanensis is only known from the upper Dayinjiang. These rivers were once connected, but are now separated. Also, the environment and temperature of the Nujiang River became greatly different between the northern and southern areas, leading to speciation.

== Taxonomy ==
Glyptosternum yunnanesis was first described in 1935. However, due to its unique teeth, a separate genus Pseudexostoma was erected in 1979 for this species. The same year, a subspecies of P. yunnanensis was described, P. y. brachysoma. However, it has become apparent that these two groups represent different species. Also, a third species, P. longipterus, was described in 2007. Results obtained by Yang et al., 2016 showed that P. longipterus cannot be distinguished from P. brachysoma from either morphological or molecular analyses and that the former name should thus be considered a junior synonym of the latter.

== Species ==
There are currently three recognized species in this genus:

- Pseudexostoma brachysoma X. L. Chu, 1979
- Pseudexostoma longipterus Zhou, Yang, Li & Li, 2007
- Pseudexostoma yunnanensis (T. L. Tchang, 1935)

== Description ==
These species have a continuous groove behind the lip, gill openings not extending onto the underside, heterodont dentition in both jaws with outer teeth shovel-shaped and sparsely arranged in one or two rows and inner teeth conical and numerous, the tooth patches separated in upper jaw, and 16–18 branched pectoral rays. The lips are thick, fleshy and papillated. The paired fin are plaited to form an adhesive apparatus. Species of this genus have a moderately compressed body. The head is depressed and broad; it appears triangular from the side and with a rounded snout from above. The eyes are small and ovoid, located at the middle of the dorsal surface of the head. The mouth is transverse and inferior, with the teeth exposed when the mouth is closed. The teeth are embedded in the skin, shovel-shaped, with the tips exposed and arranged in irregular rows. The gill openings are narrow. The dorsal surface is smooth without tubercles. There are four pairs of barbels. The adipose fin base is not connected to the caudal fin. The caudal fin is emarginate with the upper lobe smaller than the lower lobe. The lateral line is midlateral and complete.

Species of this genus are grey black on the dorsal surface and grey yellow on the ventral region; the caudal fin is grey black with an irregular, small, yellow patch in the middle and the other fins are grey yellow along the distal edge. Pseudexostoma grow to about 9.9–15.3 centimetres (3.9–6.0 in) SL. These species have three notches on the posterior margin of the lower lip. However, in P. yunnanensis, the notches are all the same depth, while in the other two species the middle notch is shallower in depth than the lateral notches. The two median lobes formed by these notches are the same length of the lateral lobes of the lips in P. yunnanensis, but they are longer in the other two species. P. yunnanensis also has more pelvic fin rays (5 vs. 3–4), a shorter adipose fin base, a deeper and longer caudal peduncle, more teeth in the premaxillary tooth band (18–22 vs. 16–18) that are divided into two partially connected patches instead of two isolated patches. P. longipterus has longer pectoral, pelvic, and caudal fins as compared to its congeners.
