= Southwest Forestry University =

University in Kunming, China

Southwest Forestry University (Chinese: 西南林业大学; pinyin: Xīnán Línyèdàxué; SWFU) is the largest forestry university in the southwestern part of China. It is a comprehensive university, consisting of 18 professional departments. It is in Kunming city, founded in 1939 (87 years ago).

== Facilities ==
As of February 2016, the school covered 1800 acres, which includes 1204.1 acres of campus, teaching experimental forest of 693 acres, building area of 450,000 square meters; teaching equipment research equipment worth 123 million yuan; 72 undergraduate majors; 16,451 full-time undergraduate students; 1230 full-time graduate students.

SWFU has 1,170 staff members that include 775 instructors — 86% of whom hold a master's degree and above. These include 350 professors and associate professors, 18 mentors for PhD candidates. Some of the professors and scholars are well-known domestically and internationally.

The university raised 253 million Chinese yuan of research funds in the past five years; won one second prize of the State Award for Science and Technology Advancement and 24 other awards for completed projects; and two first prizes of the Natural Sciences Award of Yunnan Province. More than 3,000 papers, 110 monographs and six translated monographs have been published.

== International ties ==
The university has established cooperative and exchange ties with universities and research institutes in the United States, Canada, France, Germany, Netherlands, Australia, New Zealand, Japan, Thailand, Philippines and Vietnam for joint research and training of graduate and undergraduate students.

Based on reciprocally transferable credit programs, SWFU has developed joint-education programs for undergraduate students based on the "2+2" models, as well as dispatching exchange graduate students for field practicum mandatory for thesis research with universities in the United States, Canada, Netherlands, Thailand, Poland, and Vietnam.

Joint research and training programs have been conducted in cooperation with the World Wildlife Fund (WWF), Rare Conservation, Global Environment Facility (GEF), The Nature Conservancy (TNC), MacArthur Foundation, and Ford Foundation.
