= Zhou Wei (zoologist) =

Chinese zoologist

Zhou Wei (Chinese: 周伟; pinyin: Zhōu Wěi; born June 1957) is a Chinese zoologist, professor at Southwest Forestry College.

Zhou was born in June 1957. He received his Ph.D. degree from Yunnan University in 2004.

Zhou worked at Chinese Academy of Sciences Zoology Institute at Kunming from 1982 to 1996, and joined the faculty of Southwest Forestry College in 1996.

Zhou has published 10 SCI articles, discovering 25 new species of fishes.

== Taxon described by him ==
- See Category:Taxa named by Zhou Wei (zoologist)
