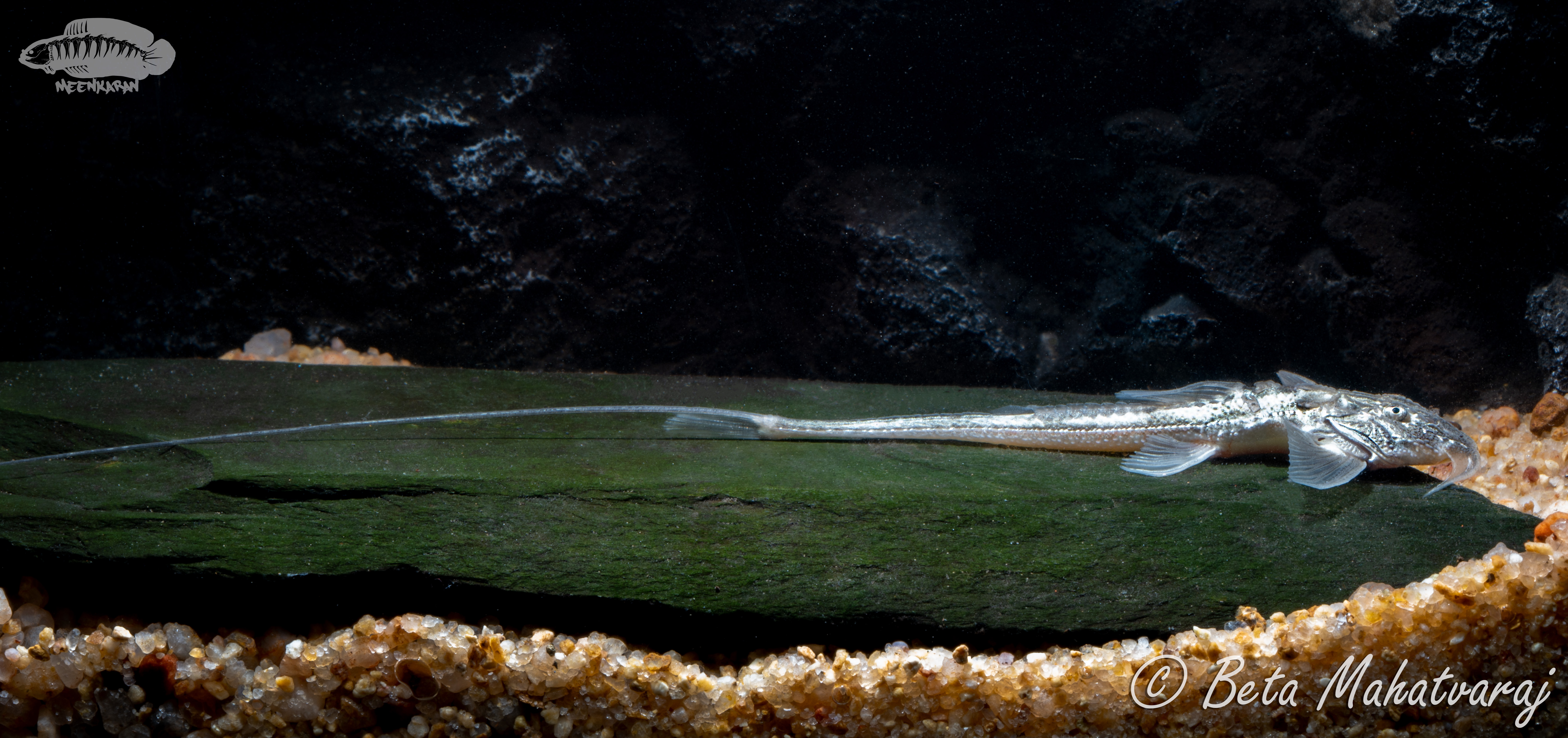
- Sisor rabdophorus

Scientific classification
- Kingdom: Animalia
- Phylum: Chordata
- Class: Actinopterygii
- Division: Teleostei
- Order: Siluriformes
- Superfamily: Sisoroidea
- Family: Sisoridae; Bleeker, 1858

Genera
- See text

Synonyms
- Erethistidae Bleeker, 1862

= Sisoridae =

Sisoridae Temporal range: Pliocene - Recent

Family of fishes

Sisoridae is a family of catfishes. These Asian catfishes live in fast-moving waters and often have adaptations that allow them to adhere to objects in their habitats. The family includes about 235 species.

== Taxonomy ==
=== Genera ===
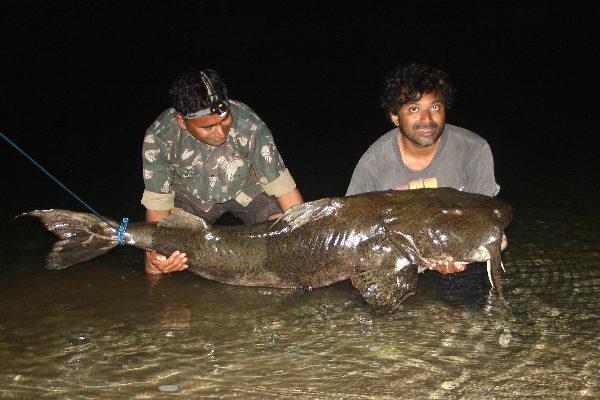
The goonch (Bagarius yarrelli), the largest member of the family

The subfamily placement is based on Eschmeyer's Catalog of Fishes:

- Subfamily Sisorinae Bleeker, 1858
  - Ayarnangra Roberts, 2001
  - Bagarius Bleeker, 1853
  - Caelatoglanis Ng & Kottelat, 2005
  - Conta Hora, 1950
  - Erethistes Müller & Troschel, 1849
  - Erethistoides Hora, 1950
  - Gagata Bleeker, 1858
  - Glyptothorax Blyth, 1860
  - Gogangra Roberts, 2001
  - Nangra Day, 1877
  - Pseudolaguvia Misra, 1976
  - Sisor Hamilton, 1822
- Subfamily Glyptosterninae Gill, 1861
  - Barbeuchiloglanis Li, Dao & Zhou, 2022
  - Chimarrichthys Sauvage, 1874
  - Creteuchiloglanis W. Zhou, X. Li & A. W. Thomson, 2011
  - Exostoma Blyth, 1860
  - Glaridoglanis Norman, 1925
  - Glyptosternon McClelland, 1842
  - Myersglanis Hora & Silas, 1952
  - Oreoglanis Smith, 1933
  - Parachiloglanis X. W. Wu, M. J. He & X. L. Chu, 1981
  - Pareuchiloglanis Pellegrin, 1936
  - Pseudecheneis Blyth, 1860
  - Pseudexostoma Chu, 1979
  - Sineuchiloglanis Li, Dao & Zhou, 2022
  - Tremeuchiloglanis Li, Dao & Zhou, 2022

=== Systematics ===
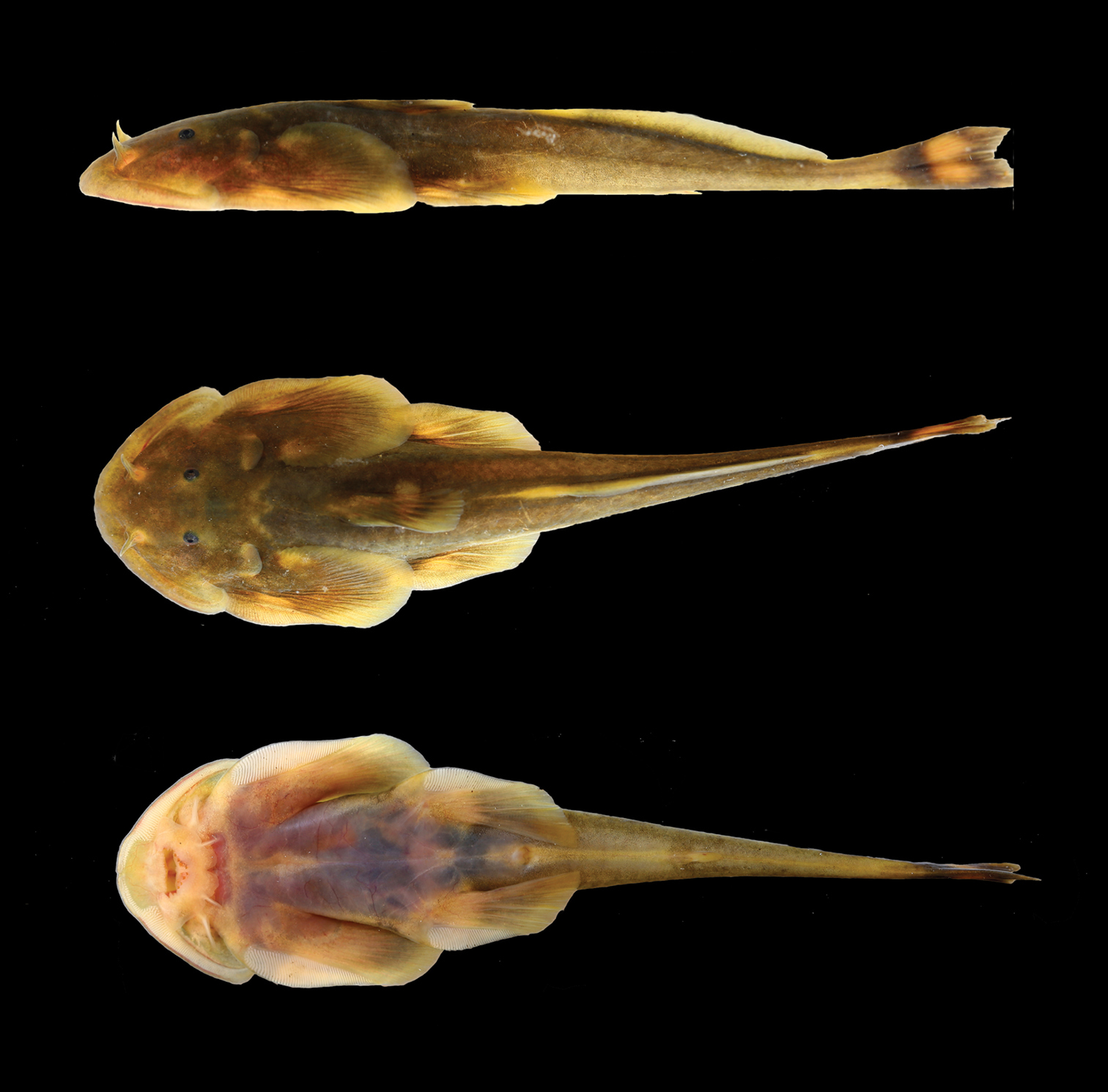
Species within Oreoglanis are unusually flattened as an adaptation for fast-flowing steams

The family Sisoridae is recognized as a natural, monophyletic group based on morphological and molecular evidence. It is divided into two subfamilies, Sisorinae and Glyptosterninae (glyptosternoids). The monophyly of the entire family and the tribe Glyptosterninae are well supported by osteological morphology and molecular data.

The monophyly of certain glyptosternoid genera is doubtful. The paraphyly of Pareuchiloglanis, Oreoglanis, and Pseudexostoma (with the possible inclusion of Myersglanis and Parachiloglanis) has been demonstrated and a rediagnosis of glyptosternine genera is needed.

Evidence from a 2007 molecular analysis supports polyphyly of Pareuchiloglanis. Glaridoglanis might be a basal member of the tribe Glyptosternina. Pseudecheneis may be placed in the tribe Glyptosternina, but its sister-group relationship between it and the monophyletic glyptosternoids cannot be rejected.

In the past, certain members of the Sisorinae were placed in their own family, Erethistidae, because they were thought to be closely related to the neotropical Aspredinidae than to the remaining sisorids due to a number of morphological characters. However, phylogenetic analyses have reaffirmed that the species classified in the Erethistidae are actually placed within the Sisorinae.

== Distribution ==
Sisorids inhabit freshwater and originate from southern Asia, from Turkey and Syria to South China and Borneo, primarily in the Oriental region. Glyptosterninae is distributed from the Caucasus to China. Most glyptosternine genera are found in China, with the exception of Myersglanis. Glyptosternoid catfish species have restricted distributions, and many apparently wide-ranging species have been shown to consist of more than one species, each with restricted distributions. Sisorids are mostly small forms inhabit mountain streams.

== Fossil record and biogeography ==
The oldest known sisorid fossil is B. bagarius found in Sumatra and India of the Pliocene. The origin of glyptosternoid fishes could be in the later Pliocene. Another study proposes glyptosternoids possibly originated in the Oligocene-Miocene boundary (19–24 Mya) and radiated from the Miocene to Pleistocene along with several rapid speciation events in a relatively short time. The three great uplifts of the Qinghai/Tibet Plateau destroyed the pattern of river systems in the late Pliocene to the early Pleistocene. The ancestor of Euchiloglanis originated from the allied Glyptosternon in the second uplift and Pareuchiloglanis, Pseudexostoma, Oreoglanis, Exostoma, and Glaridoglanis originated with the third uplift. The Exostoma group (Exostoma, Pseudexostoma, and Oreoglanis) originated after the outline of the Qinghai/Tibet Plateau was formed. The speciation of this group was not strong and the distribution limited.

== Description ==
Most of these fish have four pairs of barbels and a large adipose fin. The maximum size is 2 metres. In all fish except those of the subfamily Sisorinae, some sort of adhesive apparatus, either in the form of a thoracic adhesive apparatus or in plaited paired fins, allow the fish to adhere to objects.

In the genera Glyptothorax (tribe Glyptothoracini) and Pseudecheneis (tribe Pseudecheneidina), the species have thoracic adhesive apparatuses to attach to objects in the stream bed; in Glyptothorax, grooves of this apparatus run parallel or oblique to the axis of the body, while in Pseudecheneis grooves run transverse to the axis of the body. The thoracic adhesive apparatus is not present in the other sisorid genera. The paired fins may be plaited to form an adhesive apparatus in Pseudecheneis, glyptosternoids, and variably in Glyptothorax. Thus, glyptosternoids lack a thoracic adhesive apparatus, but do have plaited paired fins, and members of the subfamily Sisorinae lack either a thoracic adhesive apparatus or plaited paired fins.

Many of the members of this family are small, cryptically colored fish with tuberculate skin. Some genera have a pectoral girdle with a long coracoid process that extends well beyond the base of the pectoral fin; this structure can be felt through the skin in all genera and is visible externally in all genera except Pseudolaguvia. This was previously used to differentiate sisorids from erethistids when they were considered distinct families. They differ from amblycipitids in that they lack a cuplike fold of skin in front of the pectoral fin (vs. possessing the cuplike fold) and have a dorsal fin with a strong spine and no thick covering of skin (vs. a weak spine with a thick covering of skin). They have nostrils close together, separated by a nasal barbel, which differs from akysids which have widely separated nostrils on each side of the head with a barbel on the posterior nostril. Some possess a thoracic adhesive apparatus formed by longitudinal skin folds densely covered with unculi that appears to be an adaptation to life in fast-flowing waters; this closely resembles a similar structure in the sisorid Glyptothorax.
