= List of fishes of Nepal =

== Order: Anguilliformes ==
=== Anguillidae (freshwater eels) ===
- Indian mottled eel (Anguilla bengalensis bengalensis)

== Order: Cypriniformes ==
=== Balitoridae (river loaches) ===
- Mottled loach (Acanthocobitis botia)
- Gray's stone loach or rock carp (Balitora brucei) - (native)
- Balitora eddsi - (endemic)
- Nemacheilus multifasciatus - (native)
- Creek loach (Schistura beavani) - (native)
- Schistura corica - (native)
- Stone loach (Schistura rupecula) - (native)
- Schistura savona - (native)
- Schistura scaturigina - (native)

=== Cobitidae (loaches) ===
- Almorha loach (Botia almorhae) - (native)
- Reticulate loach (Botia lohachata) - (native)
- Guntea loach (Lepidocephalichthys guntea) - (native)
- Gongota loach (Somileptus gongota) - (native)

=== Cyprinidae ===
- Mola carplet (Amblypharyngodon mola)
- Bighead carp (Aristichthys nobilis) - (not established)
- Jaya or mara (Aspidoparia jaya) - (native)
- Aspidoparia morar - (native)
- Barred baril (Barilius barila) - (native)
- Barna baril (Barilius barna) - (native)
- Hamilton's barila (Barilius bendelisis) - (native)
- Shacra baril (Barilius shacra) - (native)
- Tileo baril (Barilius tileo) - (native)
- Lam faketa or dudhnea (Barilius vagra) - (native)
- Crucian carp (Carassius carassius) - (introduced)
- Bhakur or catla (Catla catla) - (native)
- Chaguni (Chagunius chagunio) - (native)
- Silver hatchet chela (Chela cachius) - (native)
- Gangetic latia (Crossocheilus latius) - (native)
- Grass carp (Ctenopharyngodon idella) - (not established)
- Assamese kingfish (Cyprinion semiplotum) - (native)
- Common carp (Cyprinus carpio carpio) - (introduced)
- Moustached danio (Danio dangila) - (native)
- Zebra danio (Danio rerio) - (native)
- Giant danio (Devario aequipinnatus) - (native)
- Devario danio, Sind danio (Devario devario) - (native)
- Tibetan snowtrout, scaly osman (Diptychus maculatus) - (native)
- Indian flying barb (Esomus danricus) - (native)
- Annandale garra (Garra annandalei) - (native)
- Sucker head (Garra gotyla gotyla) - (native)
- Gadhera (Garra lamta) - (native)
- Mullya garra (Garra mullya) - (native)
- Silver carp (Hypophthalmichthys molitrix) (not established)
- Angra labeo (Labeo angra) - (native)
- Reba (Labeo ariza) - (native)
- Bata (Labeo bata) - (introduced)
- Nepalese snowtrout (Schizothorax macrophthalmus) - (endemic)

== Order: Siluriformes ==
=== Bagridae ===
- Batasio macronotus - (endemic)
