= Malabar baril =

There are three species of fish named Malabar baril:

- Barilius bakeri
- Barilius gatensis
- Barilius malabaricus
