= Pseudolaguvia tenebricosa =

Conservation status
- Data Deficient (IUCN 3.1)

Scientific classification
- Kingdom: Animalia
- Phylum: Chordata
- Class: Actinopterygii
- Order: Siluriformes
- Family: Sisoridae
- Genus: Pseudolaguvia
- Species: P. tenebricosa

Binomial name
- Pseudolaguvia tenebricosa Britz & Ferraris, 2003

Species of fish

Pseudolaguvia tenebricosa is a species of catfish. It is only known from a fast-flowing hill stream called Pathe Chaung, near Taungoo in southern Burma.

This is a very small catfish (2.9 centimetres (1.1 in) SL) with almost black upperparts and paler underneath. It is similar to Pseudolaguvia tuberculata but differs in having a distinct gap between the dorsal and adipose fins and a narrower head with a shorter snout. It is adapted to the fast-flowing waters of its habitat by the presence of an adhesive apparatus in the form of folded pleats of skin, rather similar to that seen on members of the sisorid genus Glyptothorax.
