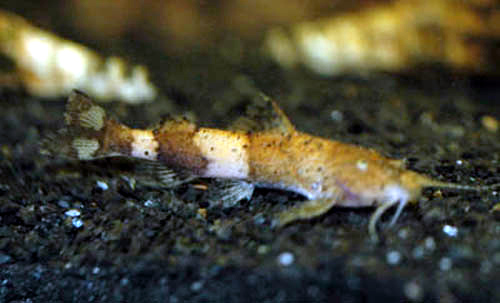
- Pseudolaguvia shawi

Scientific classification
- Kingdom: Animalia
- Phylum: Chordata
- Class: Actinopterygii
- Division: Teleostei
- Order: Siluriformes
- Family: Sisoridae
- Subfamily: Sisorinae
- Genus: Pseudolaguvia; Misra, 1976

Type species
- Glyptothorax tuberculatus Prashad & Mukerji, 1929

= Pseudolaguvia =

Genus of fishes

Pseudolaguvia is a genus of South Asian river catfishes. These species inhabit hill streams and large rivers. P. tenebricosa is found in fast running, clear water; the river has a sandy bottom and numerous rocks and boulders and aquatic vegetation is absent. P. inornata is from clear, shallow, moderately flowing streams with a predominantly sandy bottom. P. muricata is found in clear, shallow, slow-flowing streams with a mixed substrate of sand and detritus; these fish are found amongst detritus in areas with current. P. ferula is also found in swift flowing waters with a mixed rocky/sandy bottom.

== Species ==
There are currently 26 recognized species in this genus:

- Pseudolaguvia assula H. H. Ng & Conway, 2013
- Pseudolaguvia austrina Radhakrishnan, Sureshkumar & H. H. Ng, 2011
- Pseudolaguvia ferruginea H. H. Ng, 2009
- Pseudolaguvia ferula H. H. Ng, 2006
- Pseudolaguvia flavida H. H. Ng, 2009
- Pseudolaguvia flavipinna Bhakat, 2019
- Pseudolaguvia foveolata H. H. Ng, 2005
- Pseudolaguvia fucosa H. H. Ng, Lalramliana & Lalronunga, 2016
- Pseudolaguvia inornata H. H. Ng, 2005
- Pseudolaguvia jiyaensis Tamang & Sinha, 2014
- Pseudolaguvia kapuri (Tilak & Husain, 1975)
- Pseudolaguvia lapillicola Britz, A. Ali & Raghavan, 2013
- Pseudolaguvia magna Tamang & Sinha, 2014
- Pseudolaguvia meghalayaensis Yumnam Lokeshwor and Pringranchi Dokgre Marak, 2022
- Pseudolaguvia muricata H. H. Ng, 2005
- Pseudolaguvia nepalensis Rayamajhi, Arunachalam & Usharamalakshmi, 2016
- Pseudolaguvia nubila H. H. Ng, Lalramliana, Lalronunga & Lalnuntluanga, 2013
- Pseudolaguvia permaris Vijayakrishnan, Praveenraj & Mishra, 2023
- Pseudolaguvia ribeiroi (Hora, 1921) (Painted catfish)
- Pseudolaguvia shawi (Hora, 1921)
- Pseudolaguvia spicula H. H. Ng & Lalramliana, 2010
- Pseudolaguvia tenebricosa Britz & Ferraris, 2003
- Pseudolaguvia tuberculata (Prashad & Mukerji, 1929)
- Pseudolaguvia vespa Praveenraj, Vijayakrishnan, Lima & Gurumayum, 2021
- Pseudolaguvia virgulata H. H. Ng & Lalramliana, 2010
- Pseudolaguvia viriosa H. H. Ng & Tamang, 2012

== Description ==
Externally, these fish resemble members of the sisorid catfish genus Glyptothorax. Pseudolaguvia is diagnosed by the presence of a short thoracic adhesive apparatus with median depression; wide gill openings nearly meeting one another on the underside of the body; serrations on anterior margin of pectoral fin spine pointing toward tip; smooth to granulate anterior margin on the dorsal fin spine; slender body; papillate upper lip; and 8–10 anal fin rays. Both the dorsal fin and pectoral fin have strong spines. The head and body are slightly depressed. The eyes are small, dorsal, and located in the middle of the head. The barbels are annulated with black rings.
