= Pseudolaguvia nepalensis =

Scientific classification
- Domain: Eukaryota
- Kingdom: Animalia
- Phylum: Chordata
- Class: Actinopterygii
- Order: Siluriformes
- Family: Erethistidae
- Genus: Pseudolaguvia
- Species: P. nepalensis

Binomial name
- Pseudolaguvia nepalensis Rayamajhi, Arunachalam & A. Usharamalakshmi, 2016

Species of catfish

Pseudolaguvia nepalensis is a species of catfish in the family Erethistidae. It is found in Nepal.
