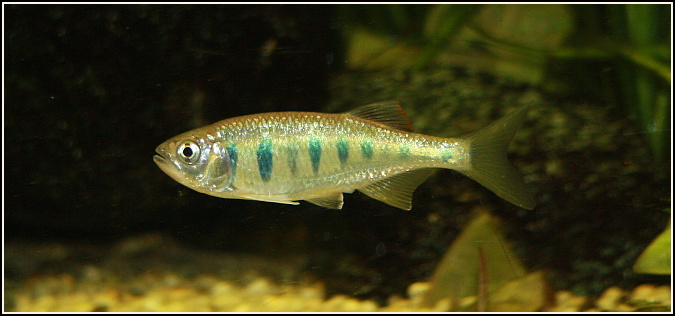

Conservation status
- Least Concern (IUCN 3.1)

Scientific classification
- Kingdom: Animalia
- Phylum: Chordata
- Class: Actinopterygii
- Order: Cypriniformes
- Family: Danionidae
- Subfamily: Chedrinae
- Genus: Opsarius
- Species: O. pulchellus

Binomial name
- Opsarius pulchellus (H. M. Smith, 1931)

Synonyms
- Barilius pulchellus Smith, 1931; Opsarus pulchellus (Smith, 1931); Barilius buddhae Fowler, 1934; Barilius bhuddhae Fowler, 1934; Barilius pellegrini Fang, 1938; Daniops macropterus Mai, 1978

= Opsarius pulchellus =

Species of fish

Opsarius pulchellus, is a species of fish in the family Danionidae, with the largest individual recorded being 11 cm long.

"Pulchellus" is a Latin diminutive meaning "beautiful".

== Range ==
O. pulchellus inhabits Indochina (Mekong River) and a small part of China (along the Mekong). They are mainly found in fast flowing rivers or clear hill streams.

== Diet ==
O. pulchellus feeds mainly on the surface of the water, feeding on dead insects that land on the surface.

== Threats ==
O. pulchellus are rarely found in markets, but are exploited by subsistence fisheries and occasionally for the aquarium trade. Habitat degradation through sedimentation increase (e.g. by large-scale damming) may become problematic in the future, especially along the Mekong and Chao Phraya.
