= Mustura tigrina =

Scientific classification
- Kingdom: Animalia
- Phylum: Chordata
- Class: Actinopterygii
- Order: Cypriniformes
- Family: Nemacheilidae
- Genus: Mustura
- Species: M. tigrina

Binomial name
- Mustura tigrina (Vishwanath & Nebeshwar Sharma, 2012)

Synonyms
- Physoschistura tigrinum Lokeshwor & Vishwanath, 2012

Species of fish

Mustura tigrina is a species of ray-finned fish belonging to the family Nemacheilidae, the stone loaches. This species is found in the Changa River drainage in the Chindwin River basin in Manipur.
