= Pseudolaguvia spicula =

Scientific classification
- Domain: Eukaryota
- Kingdom: Animalia
- Phylum: Chordata
- Class: Actinopterygii
- Order: Siluriformes
- Family: Erethistidae
- Genus: Pseudolaguvia
- Species: P. spicula

Binomial name
- Pseudolaguvia spicula H. H. Ng & Lalramliana, 2010

Species of sisorid catfish

Pseudolaguvia spicula is a species of sisorid catfish in the family Erethistidae. It is found in the Surma-Meghna River system in India and Bangladesh.

== Description ==
Pseudolaguvia spicula reaches a standard length of 3.1 cm (1.2 in).
