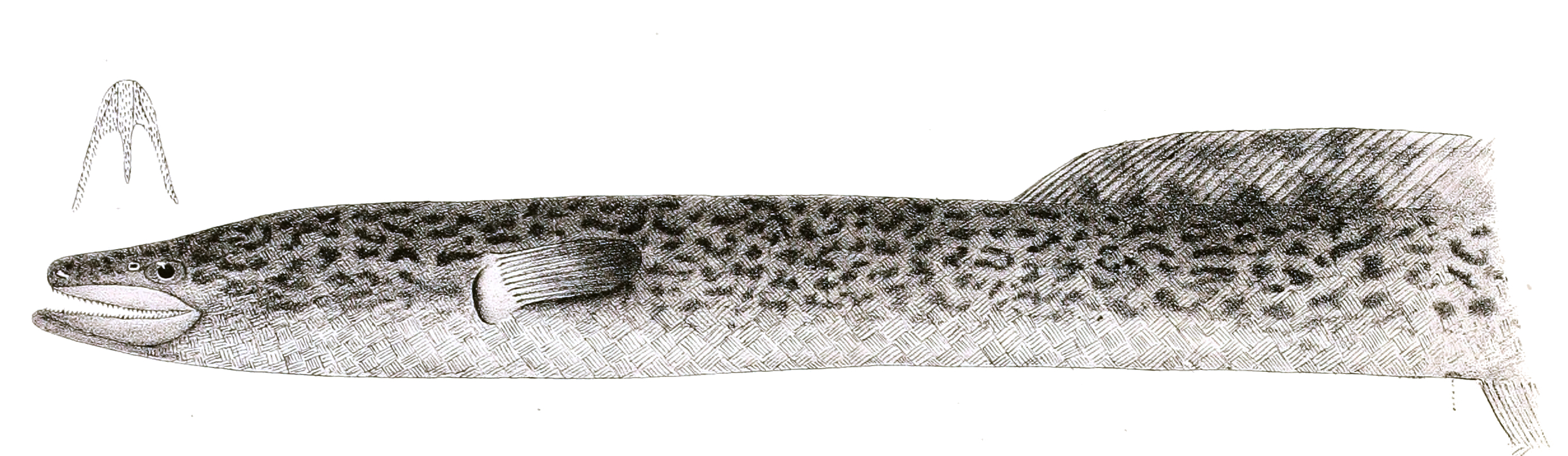

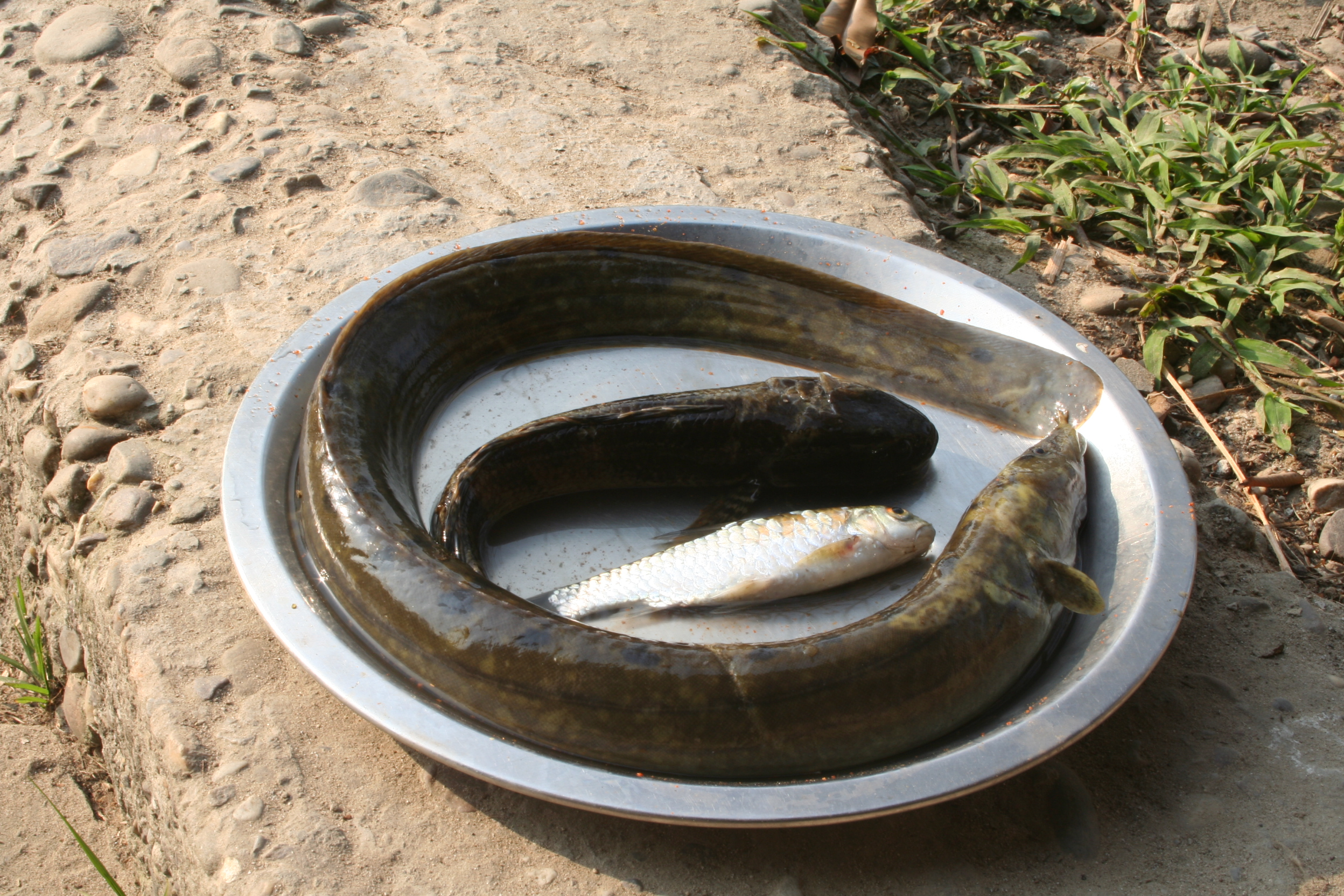
- A. b. bengalensis

Conservation status
- Near Threatened (IUCN 3.1)

Scientific classification
- Kingdom: Animalia
- Phylum: Chordata
- Class: Actinopterygii
- Order: Anguilliformes
- Family: Anguillidae
- Genus: Anguilla
- Species: A. bengalensis

Binomial name
- Anguilla bengalensis (J. E. Gray, 1831)

Subspecies
- A. b. bengalensis A. b. labiata

Synonyms
- Muraena bengalensis Gray, 1831; Anguilla bengalensis (non Gray, 1831); Anguilla elphinstonei Sykes, 1839; Anguilla nebulosa nebulosa McClelland, 1844

= Anguilla bengalensis =

Species of fish

The mottled eel (Anguilla bengalensis), also known as the African mottled eel, the Indian longfin eel, the Indian mottled eel, the long-finned eel or the river eel, is a demersal, catadromous eel in the family Anguillidae. It was described by John McClelland in 1844. It is a tropical, freshwater eel which is known from East Africa, Bangladesh, Andaman Islands, Mozambique, Malawi, Sri Lanka, Sumatra, and Indonesia and recently from Madagascar. The eels spend most of their lives in freshwater at a depth range of 3–10 metres (10–30 ft), but migrate to the Indian Ocean to breed. Males can reach a maximum total length of 121 centimetres (48 in) and a maximum weight of 7 kilograms (15 lb). The eels feed primarily off of benthic crustaceans, mollusks, finfish and worms.

Even though widely distributed, the Mottled eel was listed as Near Threatened by the IUCN Redlist as of 2019. Although the eels are too large for use in aquariums, they are commercial in subsistence fisheries.

The exact classification of the species was a debate in recent times, where some major fish websites (ex. Fish Base) classified the species under the name A. nebulosa. But according to the IUCN Red List 2015 version, the fish species should be classified as A. bengalensis with some subspecies.

== Subspecies ==
- Anguilla bengalensis bengalensis sometimes known as the Indian mottled eel.
- Anguilla bengalensis labiata sometimes known as the African mottled eel.
