= Pseudolaguvia foveolata =

Conservation status
- Data Deficient (IUCN 3.1)

Scientific classification
- Kingdom: Animalia
- Phylum: Chordata
- Class: Actinopterygii
- Order: Siluriformes
- Family: Sisoridae
- Genus: Pseudolaguvia
- Species: P. foveolata

Binomial name
- Pseudolaguvia foveolata H. H. Ng, 2005

Species of catfish

Pseudolaguvia foveolata is a species of sisorid catfish in the family Erethistidae. It is found in the Tista River, which is a tributary of the Brahmaputra River in northern West Bengal, India.

== Description ==
This species reaches a standard length of 3 cm (1.2 in).
