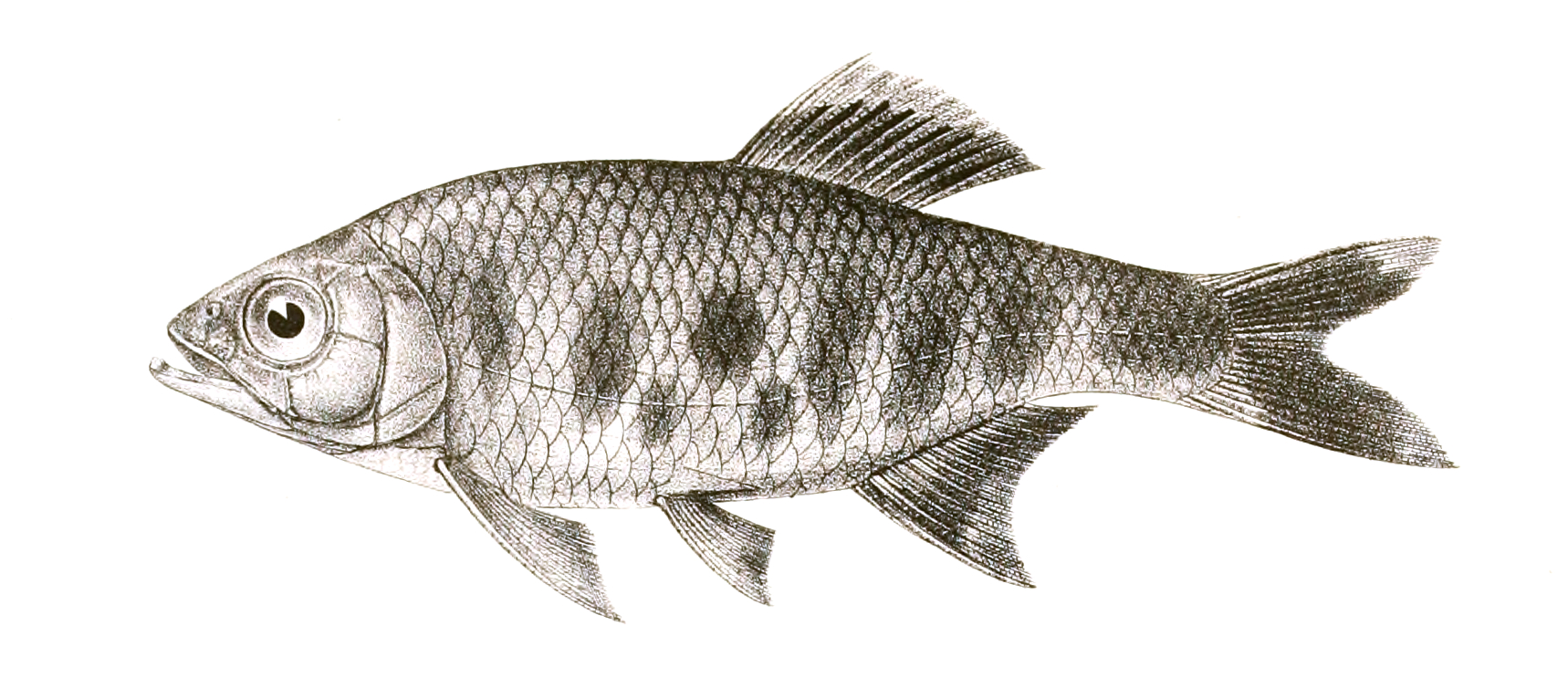
- Opsarius canarensis

Conservation status
- Endangered (IUCN 3.1)

Scientific classification
- Kingdom: Animalia
- Phylum: Chordata
- Class: Actinopterygii
- Order: Cypriniformes
- Family: Danionidae
- Genus: Opsarius
- Species: O. canarensis

Binomial name
- Opsarius canarensis Jerdon, 1849

Synonyms
- Barilius canarensis Jerdon, 1849

= Jerdon's baril =

Species of fish

Jerdon's baril (Opsarius canarensis) is a fish in the genus Opsarius of the family Danionidae. It is found in southern Karnataka and northern Kerala.
