= Mustura bella =

Conservation status
- Data Deficient (IUCN 3.1)

Scientific classification
- Kingdom: Animalia
- Phylum: Chordata
- Class: Actinopterygii
- Order: Cypriniformes
- Family: Nemacheilidae
- Genus: Mustura
- Species: M. bella

Binomial name
- Mustura bella (Kottelat, 1990)

Synonyms
- Schistura bella Kottelat, 1990

Species of fish

Mustura bella is a species of ray-finned fish in the genus Mustura.
