= Pseudolaguvia viriosa =

Scientific classification
- Domain: Eukaryota
- Kingdom: Animalia
- Phylum: Chordata
- Class: Actinopterygii
- Order: Siluriformes
- Family: Erethistidae
- Genus: Pseudolaguvia
- Species: P. viriosa

Binomial name
- Pseudolaguvia viriosa H. H. Ng & Tamang, 2012

Species of fish

Pseudolaguvia viriosa is a species of catfish in the family Erethistidae. It is found in the Brahmaputra River drainage in India.

== Description ==
Pseudolaguvia viriosa reaches a standard length of 2.7 cm (1.1 in).
