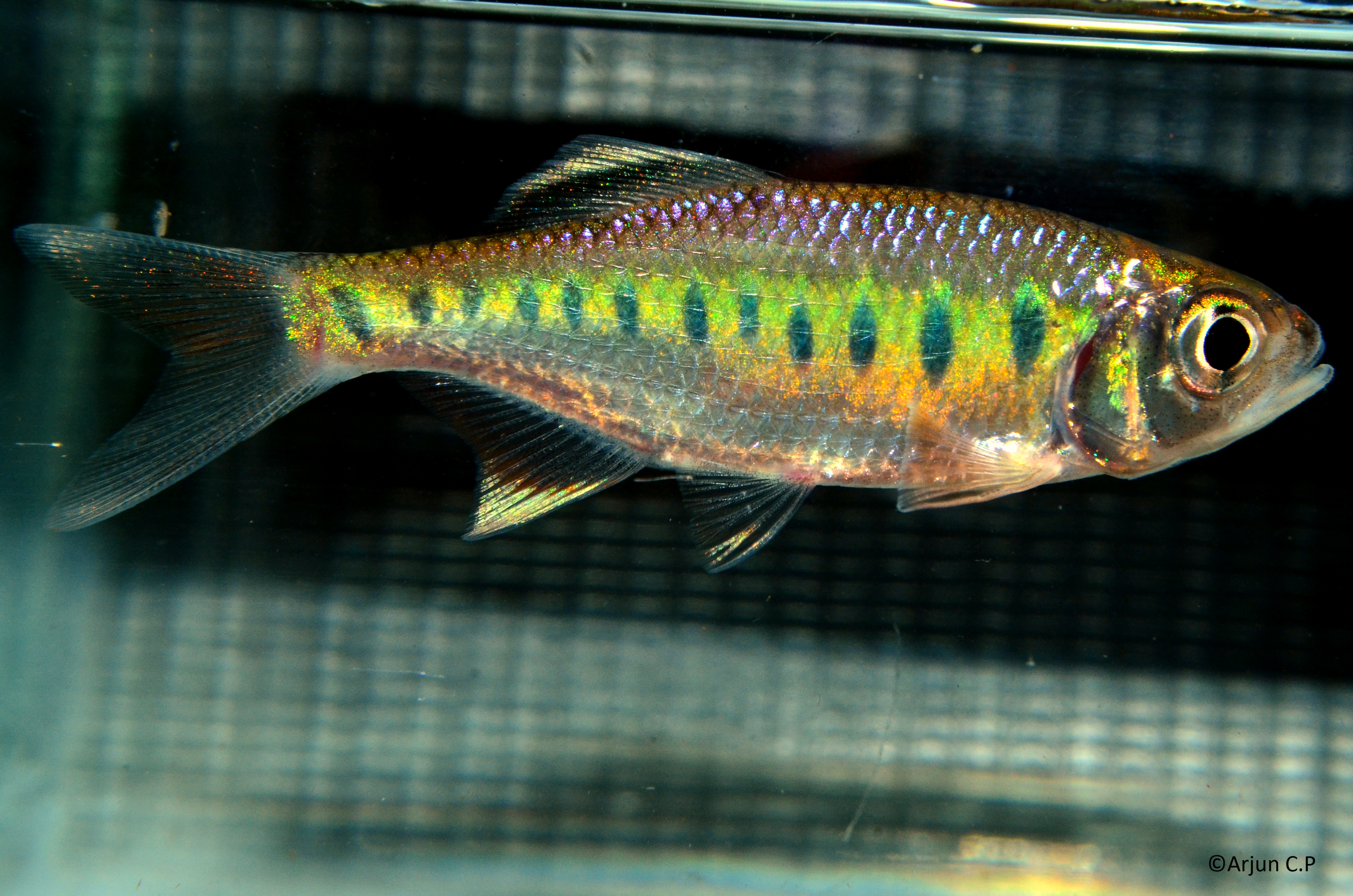

Scientific classification
- Kingdom: Animalia
- Phylum: Chordata
- Class: Actinopterygii
- Order: Cypriniformes
- Family: Danionidae
- Subfamily: Chedrinae
- Genus: Barilius; F. Hamilton, 1822

Type species
- Cyprinus barila F. Hamilton, 1822

Synonyms
- Pteropsarion Günther, 1868

= Barilius =

Genus of fishes

Barilius is a genus of freshwater ray-finned fishes belonging to the family Danionidae, the danios or danionins. The fishes in this genus are found in Asia. Four species in this genus have been described since 2012, although three have since been reallocated to Opsarius, which was formerly a group within this genus before elevation to full genus.

== Species ==
These are the currently recognized species in this genus:

- Barilius barila (F. Hamilton, 1822)
- Barilius evezardi Day, 1872
- Barilius mesopotamicus L. S. Berg, 1932
- Barilius modestus Day, 1872
- Barilius naseeri Mirza, Rafiq & F. A. Awan, 1986
- Barilius pakistanicus Mirza & Sadiq, 1978
- Barilius shariensis Fowler, 1949
- Barilius torsai Kumari, Munivenkatappa, Sinha, Borah & Das, 2019
- Barilius vagra (Hamilton, 1822)
