= Opsarius dimorphicus =

Conservation status
- Vulnerable (IUCN 3.1)

Scientific classification
- Kingdom: Animalia
- Phylum: Chordata
- Class: Actinopterygii
- Order: Cypriniformes
- Family: Danionidae
- Genus: Opsarius
- Species: O. dimorphicus

Binomial name
- Opsarius dimorphicus (Tilak & Husain, 1990)

Synonyms
- Barilius dimorphicus Tilak & Husain, 1990

Species of fish

Opsarius dimorphicus, the Song baril, is a fish in genus Opsarius of the family Danionidae. It is found in Uttaranchal, India.
