= Pseudolaguvia ferruginea =

Conservation status
- Data Deficient (IUCN 3.1)

Scientific classification
- Kingdom: Animalia
- Phylum: Chordata
- Class: Actinopterygii
- Order: Siluriformes
- Family: Sisoridae
- Genus: Pseudolaguvia
- Species: P. ferruginea

Binomial name
- Pseudolaguvia ferruginea H. H. Ng, 2009

Species of catfish

Pseudolaguvia ferruginea is a species of sisorid catfish in the family Erethistidae. It is found in the Raidak River, which is a tributary of the Sankosh River, which is in turn a tributary of the Brahmaputra River in India.

== Description ==
Pseudolaguvia ferruginea reaches a standard length of 2.9 cm (1.1 in).
