= Pseudolaguvia fucosa =

Scientific classification
- Domain: Eukaryota
- Kingdom: Animalia
- Phylum: Chordata
- Class: Actinopterygii
- Order: Siluriformes
- Family: Erethistidae
- Genus: Pseudolaguvia
- Species: P. fucosa

Binomial name
- Pseudolaguvia fucosa H. H. Ng, Lalramliana & Lalronunga, 2016

Species of sisorid catfish

Pseudolaguvia fucosa is a species of catfish in the family Erethistidae. It is found in the Karnaphuli River drainage system in Mizoram, India.

== Description ==
Pseudolaguvia fucosa reaches a standard length of 2.7 cm (1.1 in).
