= Opsarius maculatus =

Scientific classification
- Kingdom: Animalia
- Phylum: Chordata
- Class: Actinopterygii
- Order: Cypriniformes
- Family: Danionidae
- Subfamily: Chedrinae
- Genus: Opsarius
- Species: O. maculatus

Binomial name
- Opsarius maculatus McClelland, 1839

Species of fish

Opsarius maculatus is a fish in the genus Opsarius of the family Danionidae. It is endemic to India and can reach 5.9 cm (2.3 in) SL.
