= Anguilla labiata =

African mottled eel

Scientific classification
- Domain: Eukaryota
- Kingdom: Animalia
- Phylum: Chordata
- Class: Actinopterygii
- Order: Anguilliformes
- Family: Anguillidae
- Genus: Anguilla
- Species: A. bengalensis
- Subspecies: A. b. labiata

Trinomial name
- Anguilla bengalensis labiata (W. K. H. Peters, 1852)

Subspecies of fish

Anguilla bengalensis labiata, the African mottled eel, is a subspecies of eel in the genus Anguilla of the family Anguillidae.

Showing the typical characteristics of the Anguillidae, this species grows to 1.75 m and as much as 20 kg. The adult diet consists of crabs, frogs, and insects, as well as fish. It is found in east Africa: Lake Kariba, middle Zambezi, Pungwe, and Buzi systems, Upper and Lower Save/Rhunde system, Umzingwani and Limpopo Rivers. The dorsal side of the fish is mottled yellow olive, the ventral surface lighter; adults are less obviously mottled than the juveniles.
