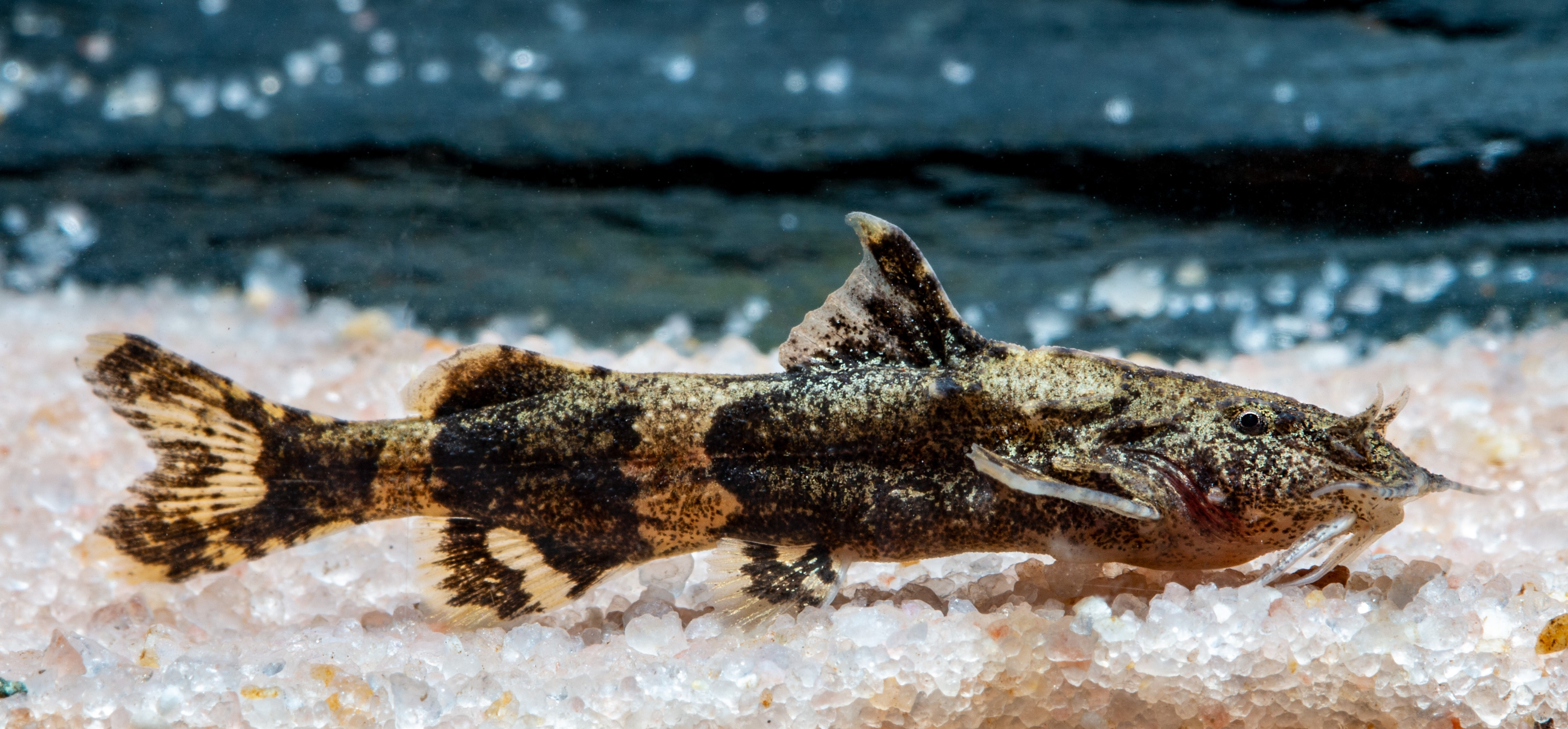

Conservation status
- Least Concern (IUCN 3.1)

Scientific classification
- Kingdom: Animalia
- Phylum: Chordata
- Class: Actinopterygii
- Order: Siluriformes
- Family: Sisoridae
- Genus: Pseudolaguvia
- Species: P. kapuri

Binomial name
- Pseudolaguvia kapuri (Tilak & Husain, 1975

Synonyms
- Laguvia ribeiroi kapuri Tilak & Husain, 1975; Glyptothorax kapuri (Tilak & Husain, 1975); Laguvia kapuri Tilak & Husain, 1975

= Pseudolaguvia kapuri =

Species of catfish

Pseudolaguvia kapuri is a species of catfish in the family Erethistidae. It is found in India and Nepal.

== Description ==
Pseudolaguvia kapuri reaches a total length of 4 cm (1.6 in).

== Etymology ==
The species epithet is named in honor of the entomologist A. P. Kapur, who was the Director of the Zoological Survey of India.
