= Opsarius lairokensis =

Conservation status
- Near Threatened (IUCN 3.1)

Scientific classification
- Kingdom: Animalia
- Phylum: Chordata
- Class: Actinopterygii
- Order: Cypriniformes
- Family: Danionidae
- Genus: Opsarius
- Species: O. lairokensis

Binomial name
- Opsarius lairokensis Arunkumar & Tombi Singh, 2000

Synonyms
- Barilius lairokensis Arunkumar & Tombi Singh, 2000

Species of fish

Opsarius lairokensis is a fish in genus Opsarius of the family Cyprinidae.

It is endemic to the Chindwin basin, Manipur, India in the region of Moreh, a booming township. As it has not been collected since initial description, it is assumed to be at risk from human activities. The specific name alludes to Lairok Maru, the stream which is the type locality.
