= Mustura maepaiensis =

Conservation status
- Data Deficient (IUCN 3.1)

Scientific classification
- Kingdom: Animalia
- Phylum: Chordata
- Class: Actinopterygii
- Order: Cypriniformes
- Family: Nemacheilidae
- Genus: Mustura
- Species: M. maepaiensis

Binomial name
- Mustura maepaiensis (Kottelat, 1990)

Species of fish

Mustura maepaiensis is a species of ray-finned fish, a stone loach in the genus Mustura. It has been recorded from the Salween basin in Mae Hong Son and Tak Provinces in north western Thailand and may also occur in Myanmar.

Its habitat is riffles in streams with a gravel or stone bed and a moderate to fast current. It is occasionally found in the aquarium trade and its populations may be affected by any human activities which interrupt fast flowing water, such as logging or agriculture.
