= Barilius shariensis =

Conservation status
- Data Deficient (IUCN 3.1)

Scientific classification
- Kingdom: Animalia
- Phylum: Chordata
- Class: Actinopterygii
- Order: Cypriniformes
- Family: Danionidae
- Subfamily: Chedrinae
- Genus: Barilius
- Species: B. shariensis

Binomial name
- Barilius shariensis Fowler, 1949

Synonyms
- Raiamas shariensis (Fowler, 1949)

Species of fish

Barilius shariensis is a species of freshwater ray-finned fish belonging to the family Danionidae, the danios or danionins. This species is known only from the holotype collected in Bahr Sara in the Lake Chad drainage system.
