= Pseudolaguvia flavida =

Conservation status
- Data Deficient (IUCN 3.1)

Scientific classification
- Kingdom: Animalia
- Phylum: Chordata
- Class: Actinopterygii
- Order: Siluriformes
- Family: Sisoridae
- Genus: Pseudolaguvia
- Species: P. flavida

Binomial name
- Pseudolaguvia flavida H. H. Ng, 2009

Species of catfish

Pseudolaguvia flavida is a species of sisorid catfish in the family Erethistidae. It is found in the Hooghly River, a tributary of the Ganges River in West Bengal, India.

== Description ==
Pseudolaguvia flavida reaches a standard length of 2.5 cm (1 in).
