= Opsarius cocsa =

Conservation status
- Data Deficient (IUCN 3.1)

Scientific classification
- Kingdom: Animalia
- Phylum: Chordata
- Class: Actinopterygii
- Order: Cypriniformes
- Family: Danionidae
- Subfamily: Chedrinae
- Genus: Opsarius
- Species: O. cocsa

Binomial name
- Opsarius cocsa (F. Hamilton, 1822)

Synonyms
- Cyprinus cocsa Hamilton, 1822; Barilius cocsa (Hamilton, 1822)

Species of fish

Opsarius cocsa is a species of danionin which is endemic to India.
