= Barilius naseeri =

Scientific classification
- Kingdom: Animalia
- Phylum: Chordata
- Class: Actinopterygii
- Order: Cypriniformes
- Family: Danionidae
- Genus: Barilius
- Species: B. naseeri

Binomial name
- Barilius naseeri Mirza, Rafiq & F. A. Awan, 1986

Species of fish

Barilius naseeri is a fish in genus Barilius of the family Cyprinidae.

== Etymology ==
The fish is named in the memory of the authors’ professor, Khan Naseerud-Din Ahmad, a head of the Department of Zoology, in the Government College, of Lahore, Pakistan.
