= Opsarius profundus =

Scientific classification
- Kingdom: Animalia
- Phylum: Chordata
- Class: Actinopterygii
- Order: Cypriniformes
- Family: Danionidae
- Genus: Opsarius
- Species: O. profundus

Binomial name
- Opsarius profundus Dishma & Vishwanath, 2012

Species of fish

Opsarius profundus is a species of freshwater ray-finned fish in belonging to the family Danionidae. It is found in India.

== Size ==
This species reaches a length of 7.1 cm (2.8 in).
