= Mustura prashadi =

Conservation status
- Vulnerable (IUCN 3.1)

Scientific classification
- Domain: Eukaryota
- Kingdom: Animalia
- Phylum: Chordata
- Class: Actinopterygii
- Order: Cypriniformes
- Family: Nemacheilidae
- Genus: Mustura
- Species: M. prashadi

Binomial name
- Mustura prashadi Hora, 1921

Synonyms
- Schistura prashadi Hora, 1921; Physoschistura prashadi (Hora, 1921)

Species of fish

Mustura prashadi is a species of ray-finned fish, a stone loach, in the genus Mustura. Some authorities place it in the genus Physoschistura It is known from just three localities in the Chindwin River drainage in Manipur, India. It is a benthic species of hill streams, preferring well oxygenated, clear, flowing water.

== Etymology ==
The specific name honours Baini Prashad (1894-1969) who was an Assistant Superintendent at the Zoological Survey of India, who gave "every possible encouragement” to the describer of this species, Sunder Lal Hora.
