= Barilius pakistanicus =

Scientific classification
- Kingdom: Animalia
- Phylum: Chordata
- Class: Actinopterygii
- Order: Cypriniformes
- Family: Danionidae
- Genus: Barilius
- Species: B. pakistanicus

Binomial name
- Barilius pakistanicus Mirza & Sadiq, 1978

Species of fish

Barilius pakistanicus is a fish in genus Barilius of the family Cyprinidae.
