= Pseudolaguvia jiyaensis =

Scientific classification
- Domain: Eukaryota
- Kingdom: Animalia
- Phylum: Chordata
- Class: Actinopterygii
- Order: Siluriformes
- Family: Erethistidae
- Genus: Pseudolaguvia
- Species: P. jiyaensis

Binomial name
- Pseudolaguvia jiyaensis Tamang & Sinha, 2014

Species of sisorid catfish

Pseudolaguvia jiyaensis is a species of catfish in the family Erethistidae. It is found in the Jiya stream in Arunachal Pradesh, India.

== Description ==
Pseudolaguvia jiyaensis reaches a standard length of 3.1 cm (1.2 in).
