= Mustura =

Scientific classification
- Kingdom: Animalia
- Phylum: Chordata
- Class: Actinopterygii
- Order: Cypriniformes
- Family: Nemacheilidae
- Genus: Mustura; Kottelat, 2018

Type species
- Mustura celata Kottelat, 2018

Genus of fishes

Mustura is a genus of fish in the family Nemacheilidae found in Myanmar.

== Species ==
These are the currently recognized species in this genus:

- Mustura arenaria (Lyu et al., 2026)
- Mustura bella (Kottelat, 1990)
- Mustura celata Kottelat, 2018
- Mustura chhimtuipuiensis (Lalramliana, Lalhlimpuia, Solo & Vanramliana, 2016)
- Mustura chindwinensis (Lokeshwor & Vishwanath, 2012)
- Mustura daral Rameshori, Chinglemba, Darshan & Vishwanath, 2022
- Mustura dikrongensis (Lokeshwor & Vishwanath, 2012)
- Mustura harkishorei (Das & Darshan, 2017)
- Mustura maepaiensis (Kottelat, 1990)
- Mustura prashadi (Hora, 1921)
- Mustura shanensis (Hora, 1929)
- Mustura shuensis (Bohlen & Šlechtová, 2014)
- Mustura subhashi Choudhury, Das, Bharali, Sarma, Tyagi, Lal & Sarma, 2021
- Mustura tigrina (Lokeshwor & Vishwanath, 2012)
- Mustura tuivaiensis (Lokeshwor, Vishwanath & Shanta, 2012)
- Mustura walongensis (Tamang & Sinha, 2016)
- Mustura yangi Qin, Kottelat, Kyaw & X. Chen, 2022
- Mustura yunnaniloides (X. Chen, Kottelat & Neely, 2011)
