= Opsarius ornatus =

Conservation status
- Least Concern (IUCN 3.1)

Scientific classification
- Kingdom: Animalia
- Phylum: Chordata
- Class: Actinopterygii
- Order: Cypriniformes
- Family: Danionidae
- Genus: Opsarius
- Species: O. ornatus

Binomial name
- Opsarius ornatus (Sauvage, 1883)

Synonyms
- Barilius ornatus Sauvage, 1883

Species of fish

Opsarius ornatus is a species of freshwater ray-finned fish in belonging to the family Danionidae. This fish is found in mainland Southeast Asia.
