= Pseudolaguvia tuberculata =

Conservation status
- Data Deficient (IUCN 3.1)

Scientific classification
- Kingdom: Animalia
- Phylum: Chordata
- Class: Actinopterygii
- Order: Siluriformes
- Family: Sisoridae
- Genus: Pseudolaguvia
- Species: P. tuberculata

Binomial name
- Pseudolaguvia tuberculata (Prashad & Mukerji, 1929)

Synonyms
- Glyptothorax tuberculatus Prashad & Mukerji, 1929; Pseudolaguvia tuberculatus (Prashad & Mukerji, 1929)

Species of catfish

Pseudolaguvia tuberculata is a species of catfish in the family Erethistidae. It is found in Myanmar.

== Description ==
Pseudolaguvia tuberculata reaches a standard length of 3 centimetres (1.2 in).
