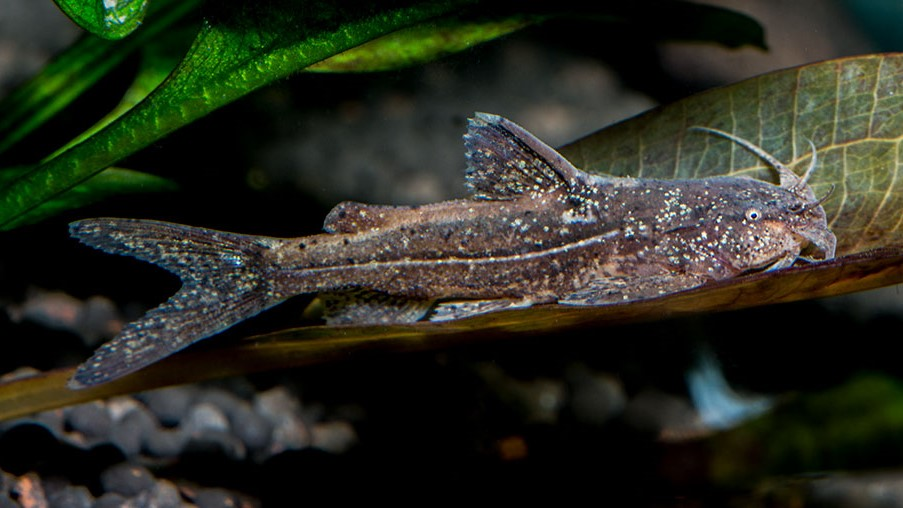

Conservation status
- Data Deficient (IUCN 3.1)

Scientific classification
- Kingdom: Animalia
- Phylum: Chordata
- Class: Actinopterygii
- Order: Siluriformes
- Family: Sisoridae
- Genus: Pseudolaguvia
- Species: P. austrina

Binomial name
- Pseudolaguvia austrina Radhakrishnan, Sureshkumar & H. H. Ng, 2011

= Pseudolaguvia austrina =

Species of catfish

Pseudolaguvia austrina is a species of catfish in the family Erethistidae. It is found in the Kunthipuzha River, a tributary of the Bharathapuzha River originating from the Western Ghats in southern India.
