= Opsarius infrafasciatus =

Scientific classification
- Kingdom: Animalia
- Phylum: Chordata
- Class: Actinopterygii
- Order: Cypriniformes
- Family: Danionidae
- Genus: Opsarius
- Species: O. infrafasciatus

Binomial name
- Opsarius infrafasciatus (Fowler, 1934)

Synonyms
- Barilius infrafasciatus Fowler, 1934

Species of fish

Opsarius infrafasciatus is a species of ray-finned fish belonging to the family Danionidae. This species is found in Thailand.
