= Opsarius ardens =

Conservation status
- Data Deficient (IUCN 3.1)

Scientific classification
- Kingdom: Animalia
- Phylum: Chordata
- Class: Actinopterygii
- Order: Cypriniformes
- Family: Danionidae
- Genus: Opsarius
- Species: O. ardens

Binomial name
- Opsarius ardens Knight, Rai, d'Souza & Vijaykrishnan, 2015

Synonyms
- Barilius ardens

Species of fish

Opsarius ardens is a fish in genus Opsarius of the family Danionidae. It is found in Sita and Swarna River systems in the Western Ghats of India.
