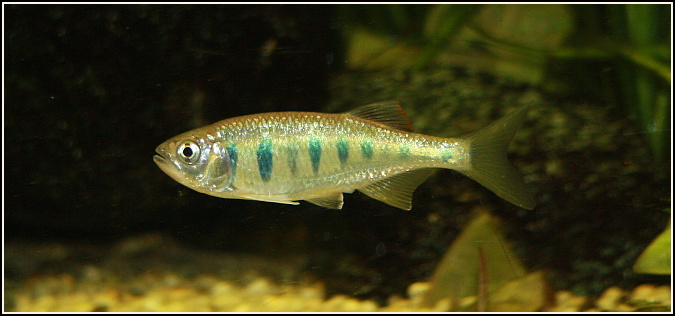
- Opsarius pulchellus

Scientific classification
- Kingdom: Animalia
- Phylum: Chordata
- Class: Actinopterygii
- Order: Cypriniformes
- Family: Danionidae
- Subfamily: Chedrinae
- Genus: Opsarius; McClelland, 1839

Type species
- Opsarius maculatus McClelland, 1839

Synonyms
- Perilampus McClelland, 1838; Chedrus Swainson, 1839; Pachystomus Heckel, 1843; Bendilisis Bleeker, 1860; Shacra Bleeker, 1860; Schacra Günther, 1868; Allodanio H. M. Smith, 1945; Paradaniops V. H. Nguyễn & L. H. Doan, 1969

= Opsarius =

Genus of fish

Opsarius is a genus of fish. Its representatives can be found in a variety of countries in South East Asia. These countries include Cambodia, Laos, Thailand, Myanmar, India, and China. Certain species of Opsarius are considered endemic to their respective habitats; such as Opsarius cocsa and Opsarius maculatus which are endemic to India.

== Species ==
Opsarius includes the following species:

- Opsarius ardens Knight, A. Rai, D'Souza & Vijaykrishnan, 2015
- Opsarius arunachalensis (Nath, Dam & Kumar, 2010)
- Opsarius bakeri (Day, 1865)
- Opsarius barna (Hamilton, 1822) (Barna baril)
- Opsarius barnoides (Vinciguerra, 1890)
- Opsarius bendelisis (Hamilton, 1807)
- Opsarius bernatziki (Koumans 1937)
- Opsarius canarensis Jerdon, 1849 (Jerdon's baril)
- Opsarius caudiocellatus (X. L. Chu, 1984)
- Opsarius cocsa (Hamilton, 1822)
- Opsarius cyanochlorus (Plamoottil & Vineeth, 2020)
- Opsarius dimorphicus (Tilak & Husain, 1990) (Song baril)
- Opsarius dogarsinghi (Hora, 1921) (Manipur baril)
- Opsarius gatensis (Valenciennes, 1844) (Malabar baril)
- Opsarius howesi (Barman, 1986)
- Opsarius infrafasciatus (Fowler, 1934)
- Opsarius kamjongensis (Arunkumar, Thoibi & Jajo, 2023)
- Opsarius kanaensis Arunkumar & Moyon, 2017
- Opsarius koratensis (H. M. Smith, 1931)
- Opsarius lairokensis (Arunkumar & Tombi Singh 2000)
- Opsarius maculatus McClelland, 1839
- Opsarius malabaricus Jerdon, 1849
- Opsarius ornatus (Sauvage, 1883)
- Opsarius profundus (Dishma & Vishwanath, 2012)
- Opsarius pulchellus (H. M. Smith, 1931)
- Opsarius putaoensis T. Qin, K. W. Maung & X. Y. Chen, 2019
- Opsarius radiolatus (Günther, 1868) (Günther's baril)
- Opsarius sajikensis Moyon & Arunkumar, 2019
- Opsarius shacra (Hamilton, 1822) (Shacra baril)
- Opsarius siangi Kumari, Borah, Nair & Suresh, 2024
- Opsarius signicaudus (Tejavej, 2012)
- Opsarius tileo (Hamilton, 1822) (Tileo baril)

== Status ==
According to the IUCN Red List, significant data is lacking to determine the status of all of the Opsarius species except for Opsarius koratensis. Opsarius koratensis was last evaluated in March 2011 and was determined to be stable and locally common throughout its range. Habitat deterioration, specifically agriculture, deforestation, pollution, and other ecosystem modifiers, is a possible hazard for these fishes.

== Habitat ==
Fishes of the genus Opsarius can be found in inland freshwaters such as streams, rivers, creeks, and waterfalls. Generally, these water bodies will have sandy or rocky bottoms which is the preferred benthic environment for these fishes. Fishes of this genus have also been known to live in wetlands.

== Discovery ==
The first evidence of Opsarius in scientific literature can be found in the book Indian Cyprinidae published in 1839 by John McCleland. In this book many different Opsarius species were identified. In the following years little additional information on this genus of fish was collected, until 1991, when the name was revalidated and all the members of 'group ii' in the genus Barilius were reallocated. This split was confirmed by Maurice Kottelat in 2013.

== Body Characteristics ==
Species of the genus Opsarius have widely cleft mouths resemblant of carp. Additionally, Opsarius species will have a slender body usually marked by transverse blue stripes or spots. The dorsal fins of Opsarius are spineless and small. One of the largest Opsarius species is Opsarius tileo which grows to 15 cm (5.9 in) in length.

== Diet ==
Some Opsarius species are considered to be fish-eating. Other Opsarius species are surface feeders and primarily will feed on insects. The insects that Opsarius species will choose to feed on will be smaller in size as the gape limitation limits Opsarius species to what they can fit in their mouths.

== Human Uses ==
Humans use the various species of Opsarius in a variety of ways. Opsarius pulchellus is not considered food, but is used as bait in fence filter traps. Opsarius pulchellus also is sold in the aquarium trade internationally. Opsarius koratensis is not used by humans as widely as the prior. Opsarius koratensis is not used for food, or for fishing, and is rarely seen in the aquarium trade. Opsarius tileo is considered a good table fish, especially in the Eastern Himalayas. Opsarius tileo is also found in the aquarium trade. Opsarius bernatziki is not used as a food fish but is found in the ornamental fish trade. Opsarius barna is not used widely in the aquarium trade. In Nepal, Opsarius barna stimulates the economy by being sold as a food fish. Opsarius barnoides is not used as a food fish but as an aquarium fish.

Opsarius is the kind of fish mentioned in the gospel of John at the miracle of feeding a multitude. (John chapter 6)
