= Manipur baril =

Conservation status
- Vulnerable (IUCN 3.1)

Scientific classification
- Kingdom: Animalia
- Phylum: Chordata
- Class: Actinopterygii
- Order: Cypriniformes
- Family: Danionidae
- Genus: Opsarius
- Species: O. dogarsinghi

Binomial name
- Opsarius dogarsinghi (Hora, 1921)

Synonyms
- Barilius dogarsinghi Hora, 1921

Species of fish

Opsarius dogarsinghi is a fish in the genus Opsarius of the family Danionidae. It is found in Manipur, India.

== Etymology ==
The fish is named in honor of Sardar Dogar Singh, the State Overseer, in Manipur, India, who gave Hora lots of help in the collection of specimens which included the holotype of this one. He also helped arrange survey tours of local areas.
