= Pseudolaguvia lapillicola =

Conservation status
- Data Deficient (IUCN 3.1)

Scientific classification
- Kingdom: Animalia
- Phylum: Chordata
- Class: Actinopterygii
- Order: Siluriformes
- Family: Sisoridae
- Genus: Pseudolaguvia
- Species: P. lapillicola

Binomial name
- Pseudolaguvia lapillicola Britz, A. Ali & Raghavan, 2013

Species of catfish

Pseudolaguvia lapillicola is a species of catfish in the family Erethistidae. It is found in the Kumaradhara River in Karnataka, southern India.
