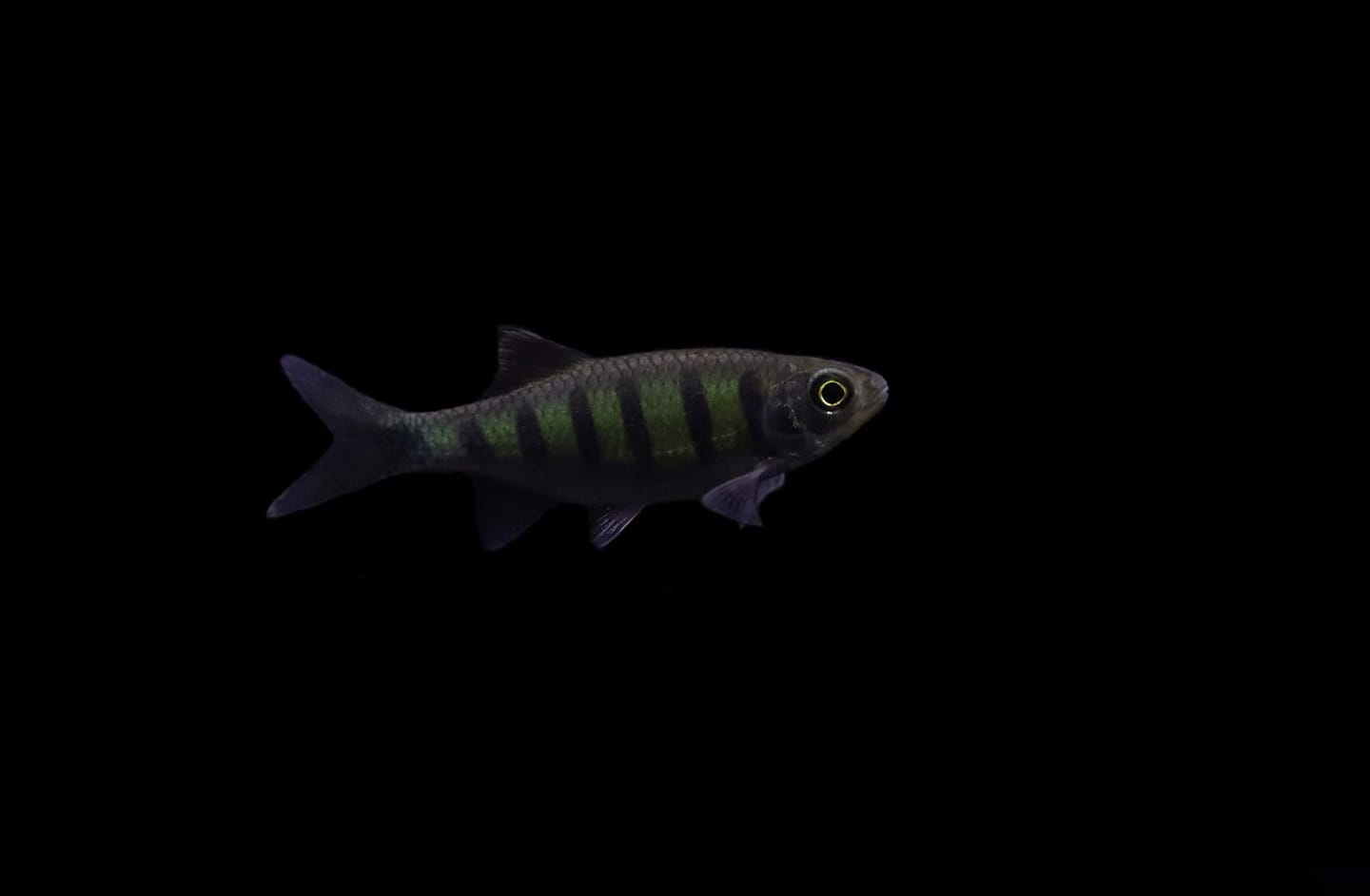
- Opsarius bernatziki juvenile

Conservation status
- Least Concern (IUCN 3.1)

Scientific classification
- Kingdom: Animalia
- Phylum: Chordata
- Class: Actinopterygii
- Order: Cypriniformes
- Family: Danionidae
- Subfamily: Chedrinae
- Genus: Opsarius
- Species: O. bernatziki

Binomial name
- Opsarius bernatziki (Koumans, 1937)

Synonyms
- Barilius bernatziki Koumans, 1937

= Opsarius bernatziki =

Species of fish

Opsarius bernatziki is a fish in the Opsarius genus of the family Danionidae. It is found in Thailand, Southeast Myanmar, and the Malay Peninsula. It is associated with a freshwater habitat and can grow up to 9.1 cm.

== Etymology ==
The fish is named in honor of Hugo Bernatzik (1897–1953), an Austrian anthropologist, photographer and a travel writer, who collected the holotype specimen.
