= Pseudolaguvia inornata =

Conservation status
- Data Deficient (IUCN 3.1)

Scientific classification
- Kingdom: Animalia
- Phylum: Chordata
- Class: Actinopterygii
- Order: Siluriformes
- Family: Sisoridae
- Genus: Pseudolaguvia
- Species: P. inornata

Binomial name
- Pseudolaguvia inornata H. H. Ng, 2005

Species of catfish

Pseudolaguvia inornata is a species of sisorid catfish in the family Erethistidae. It is found in the Feni River drainage of Bangladesh.

== Description ==
Pseudolaguvia inornata reaches a length of 2.7 cm (1.1 in).
