= Opsarius caudiocellatus =

Conservation status
- Data Deficient (IUCN 3.1)

Scientific classification
- Kingdom: Animalia
- Phylum: Chordata
- Class: Actinopterygii
- Order: Cypriniformes
- Family: Danionidae
- Genus: Opsarius
- Species: O. caudiocellatus

Binomial name
- Opsarius caudiocellatus (X. L. Chu, 1984)

Synonyms
- Barilius caudiocellatus X. L. Chu, 1984

Species of fish

Opsarius caudiocellatus is a species of freshwater ray-finned fish belonging to the family Danionidae. This fish is found in China.
