= Barilius mesopotamicus =

Conservation status
- Least Concern (IUCN 3.1)

Scientific classification
- Kingdom: Animalia
- Phylum: Chordata
- Class: Actinopterygii
- Order: Cypriniformes
- Family: Danionidae
- Genus: Barilius
- Species: B. mesopotamicus

Binomial name
- Barilius mesopotamicus L. S. Berg, 1932

Species of fish

Barilius mesopotamicus, the Mesopotamian minnow or Mesopotamian barilius, is a species of fish in the family Cyprinidae. It is found in rivers, streams and irrigation ditches, usually with some flow and water temperatures from 12 to 24 °C (54–75 °F), in the Tigris-Euphrates basin of Iran, Iraq, Syria and Turkey. It reaches a length of about 7 cm (2.8 in).
