= Pseudolaguvia assula =

Scientific classification
- Domain: Eukaryota
- Kingdom: Animalia
- Phylum: Chordata
- Class: Actinopterygii
- Order: Siluriformes
- Family: Erethistidae
- Genus: Pseudolaguvia
- Species: P. assula

Binomial name
- Pseudolaguvia assula H. H. Ng & Conway, 2013

Species of catfish

Pseudolaguvia assula is a species of catfish in the family Erethistidae. It is found in the Reu River in the Chitwan Valley near the confluence with the East Rapti River in the Ganges drainage of Nepal.
