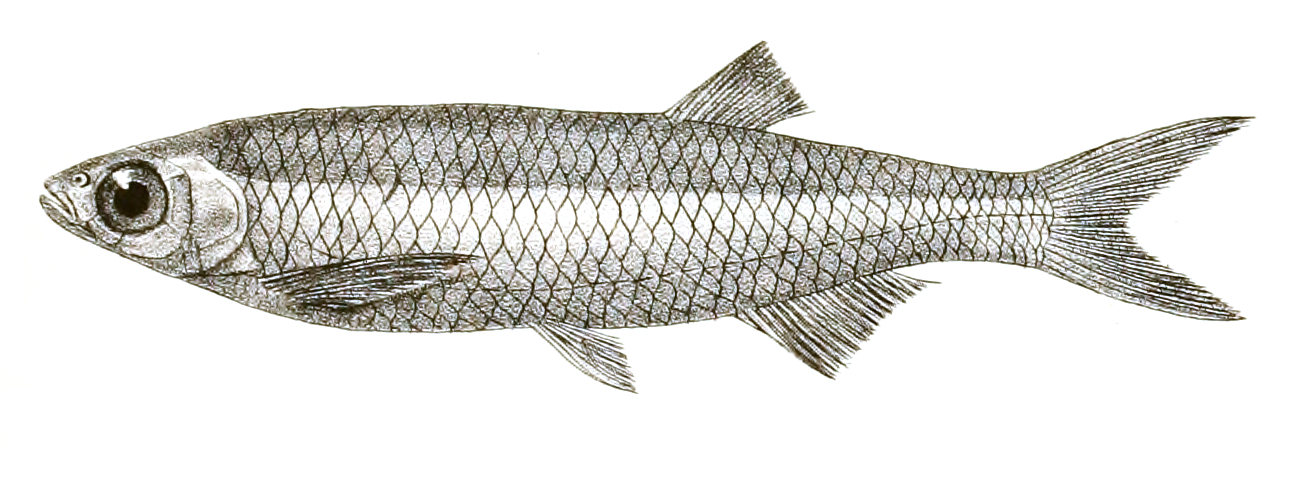

Conservation status
- Data Deficient (IUCN 3.1)

Scientific classification
- Kingdom: Animalia
- Phylum: Chordata
- Class: Actinopterygii
- Order: Cypriniformes
- Family: Danionidae
- Genus: Barilius
- Species: B. evezardi

Binomial name
- Barilius evezardi F. Day, 1872

= Day's baril =

Species of fish

Barilius evezardi is a fish in genus Barilius of the family Danionidae. It is found in Maharashtra of India, specifically in the upper reaches of rivers on hills.

== Physiology ==
All species of Barilius carp are described as having somewhat stretched bodies, with B. evezardi reaching from around 11 to 18 centimeters in length. Their bodies resemble a rounded, compressed imperfect cylinder. Their heads, by contrast, are quite acute, with especially edged snouts. They have large eyes, and a mouth that's directed upwards, with their lower jaw being smaller than their upper jaw. They also have 3 rows of pharyngeal teeth. Their caudal fin is also forked, and their air bladder is free, large, and it encompasses the whole breadth of the abdomen.

The Day's baril has several unique characteristics among its Barilius brethren. It is the only Barilius fish to have a lateral band. It is also described as having "large & well developed" tubercles on its head, while other Barilius carps are described as either having "poor, undeveloped" tubercles, or simply large tubercles on different areas. It also has absent barbels, and although that's not unique to only this Barilius, over half of the Barilius species have barbels.

== Etymology ==
The fish is named in honor of Col. George C. Evezard (1826-1901) of the Bombay Staff Corps, who assisted in the collection of natural specimens in Puna, India.
