= Opsarius barnoides =

Conservation status
- Least Concern (IUCN 3.1)

Scientific classification
- Kingdom: Animalia
- Phylum: Chordata
- Class: Actinopterygii
- Order: Cypriniformes
- Family: Danionidae
- Subfamily: Chedrinae
- Genus: Opsarius
- Species: O. barnoides

Binomial name
- Opsarius barnoides Vinciguerra, 1890

Synonyms
- Barilius barnoides Vinciguerra, 1890; Danio monshiensis Yang & Hwang, 1964; Opsarius chatricensis (Selim & Vishwanath, 2002)

Species of fish

Opsarius barnoides is a fish in genus Opsarius of the family Danionidae. It is found in Myanmar and China.
