= Opsarius radiolatus =

Conservation status
- Data Deficient (IUCN 3.1)

Scientific classification
- Kingdom: Animalia
- Phylum: Chordata
- Class: Actinopterygii
- Division: Teleostei
- Order: Cypriniformes
- Family: Danionidae
- Genus: Opsarius
- Species: O. radiolatus

Binomial name
- Opsarius radiolatus (Günther, 1868)

Synonyms
- Barilius radiolatus Günther, 1868; Barilius nelsoni Barman, 1988; Opsarius nelsoni (Barman, 1988)

Species of fish

Opsarius radiolatus is a species of freshwater ray-finned fish belonging to the family Danionidae. This species inhabits clear, gravelly streams in central India and Nepal. The maximum published total length for this species is 10 cm (3.9 in).
