= Pseudolaguvia virgulata =

Conservation status
- Data Deficient (IUCN 3.1)

Scientific classification
- Kingdom: Animalia
- Phylum: Chordata
- Class: Actinopterygii
- Order: Siluriformes
- Family: Sisoridae
- Genus: Pseudolaguvia
- Species: P. virgulata

Binomial name
- Pseudolaguvia virgulata H. H. Ng & Lalramliana, 2010

Species of catfish

Pseudolaguvia virgulata is a species of catfish in the family Erethistidae. It is found in the Barak River drainage in Mizoram, India.

== Description ==
Pseudolaguvia virgulata reaches a standard length of 2.9 cm (1.1 in).
