= Pseudolaguvia magna =

Scientific classification
- Domain: Eukaryota
- Kingdom: Animalia
- Phylum: Chordata
- Class: Actinopterygii
- Order: Siluriformes
- Family: Erethistidae
- Genus: Pseudolaguvia
- Species: P. magna

Binomial name
- Pseudolaguvia magna Tamang & Sinha, 2014

Species of catfish

Pseudolaguvia magna is a species of catfish in the family Erethistidae. It is found in the Jiya stream in Arunachal Pradesh, India.

== Description ==
Pseudolaguvia magna reaches a standard length of 4.7 cm (1.9 in).
