= Pseudolaguvia nubila =

Scientific classification
- Domain: Eukaryota
- Kingdom: Animalia
- Phylum: Chordata
- Class: Actinopterygii
- Order: Siluriformes
- Family: Erethistidae
- Genus: Pseudolaguvia
- Species: P. nubila

Binomial name
- Pseudolaguvia nubila H. H. Ng, Lalramliana, Lalronunga & Lalnuntluanga, 2013

Species of sisorid catfish

Pseudolaguvia nubila is a species of catfish in the family Erethistidae. It is found in the Kaladan River drainage system in southern Mizoram, India.

== Description ==
Pseudolaguvia nubila reaches a standard length of 3.3 cm (1.3 in).
