= Opsarius koratensis =

Conservation status
- Least Concern (IUCN 3.1)

Scientific classification
- Kingdom: Animalia
- Phylum: Chordata
- Class: Actinopterygii
- Order: Cypriniformes
- Family: Danionidae
- Subfamily: Chedrinae
- Genus: Opsarius
- Species: O. koratensis

Binomial name
- Opsarius koratensis (Smith, 1931)

Synonyms
- Barilius koratensis Smith, 1931; Barilius nanensis Smith, 1945; Danio menglaensis He & Chen, 1994

Species of fish

Opsarius koratensis is a fish in genus Opsarius of the family Danionidae. It is found in the Mekong and Chao Phraya basins and can reach 10 cm (3.9 in) standard length (SL).
