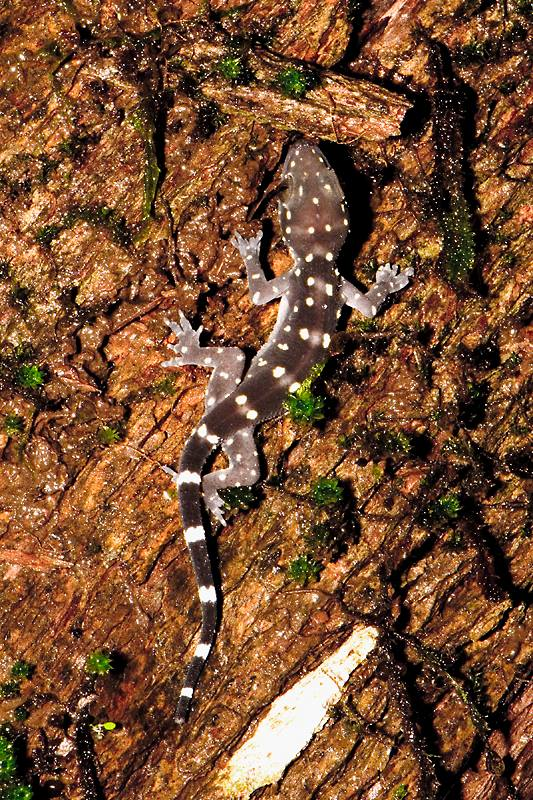

Conservation status
- Least Concern (IUCN 3.1)

Scientific classification
- Kingdom: Animalia
- Phylum: Chordata
- Class: Reptilia
- Order: Squamata
- Suborder: Gekkota
- Family: Gekkonidae
- Genus: Hemidactylus
- Species: H. prashadi

Binomial name
- Hemidactylus prashadi M.A. Smith, 1935

= Hemidactylus prashadi =

Species of lizard

Hemidactylus prashadi, also known commonly as the Bombay leaf-toed gecko or Prashad's gecko, is a species of lizard in the family Gekkonidae. The species is endemic to the Western Ghats of India.

== Etymology ==
The specific name, prashadi, is in honor of Indian zoologist Baini Prashad (1894–1969).

== Geographic range ==
H. prashadi is found in India (former Bombay Presidency).

Type locality: "neighbourhood of Jog, N. Kanara district, Bombay Presidency".

== Habitat ==
The natural habitat of H. prashadi is forest at altitudes of 15–1,500 m (49–4,921 ft).

== Description ==
H. prashadi may attain a snout-to-vent length (SVL) of 9.5 cm (3.7 in), with a tail length of 12 cm (4.7 in).

== Reproduction ==
H. prashadi is oviparous.
