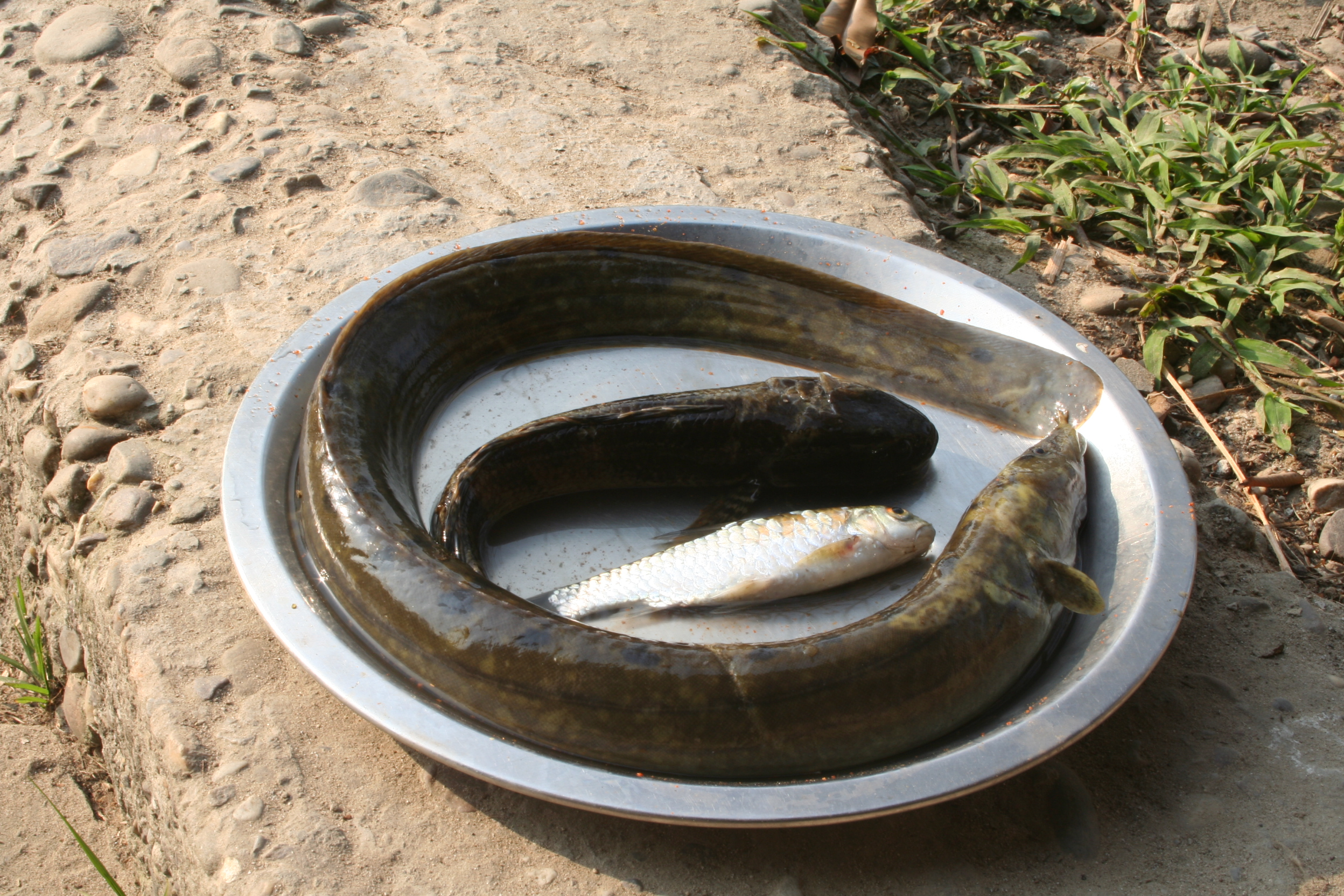

Scientific classification
- Kingdom: Animalia
- Phylum: Chordata
- Class: Actinopterygii
- Order: Anguilliformes
- Family: Anguillidae
- Genus: Anguilla
- Species: A. bengalensis
- Subspecies: A. b. bengalensis

Trinomial name
- Anguilla bengalensis bengalensis (J. E. Gray, 1831)

= Anguilla bengalensis bengalensis =

Indian mottled eel

Subspecies of fish

Anguilla bengalensis bengalensis, the Indian mottled eel, is a subspecies of eel in the genus Anguilla. It is found throughout the Indian subcontinent and neighbouring regions including the East Indies. The Indian mottled eel is valued as a food fish. The mucus of this eel is used in a medicine for arthritis. It is known by numerous common names in the native languages of the regions it inhabits.

== Description ==
Showing the typical characteristics of the Anguillidae, this species grows to 1.2 m and as much as 6 kg. Dorsal fin soft rays number 250–305, anal fin soft rays 220–250, vertebrae between 106 and 112 in number. They have a fecundity of about 0.33-1.72 x 10^6.

== Habitat ==
Anguilla bengalensis bengalensis primarily lives in freshwater habitats, but can be found in estuaries and marine waters during early life and near maturity.

== Other names ==
In Telugu, it is known as "maluguchaapa." In Malayalam, it is known as "Mananjil." In Nepali, it is known as "Raj Baam." In Marathi, it is known as "Vaamb." In Tamil, it is known as "vealangu meen". In Bengali it is known as Baam maach or Tambu maach.
