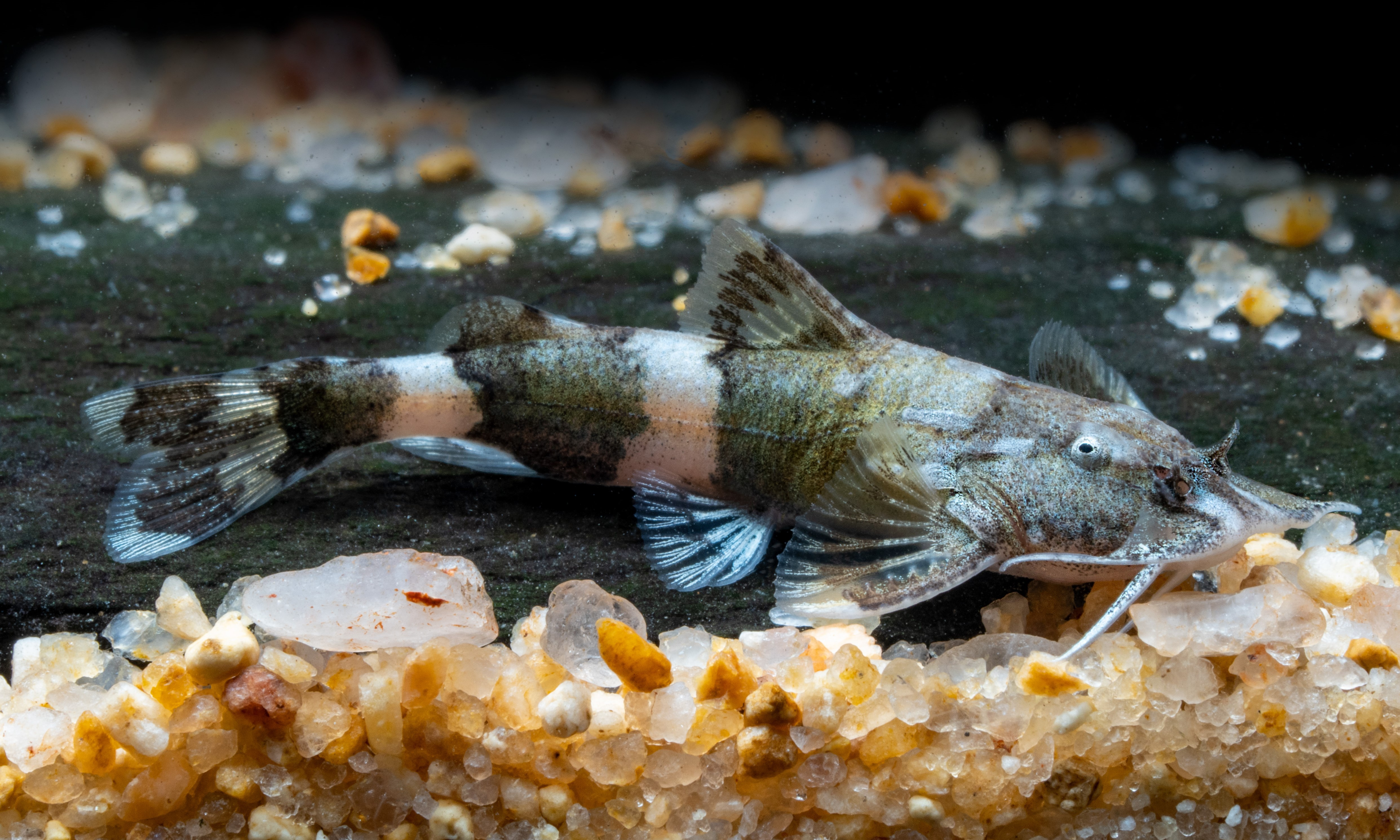

Conservation status
- Least Concern (IUCN 3.1)

Scientific classification
- Kingdom: Animalia
- Phylum: Chordata
- Class: Actinopterygii
- Order: Siluriformes
- Family: Sisoridae
- Genus: Pseudolaguvia
- Species: P. shawi

Binomial name
- Pseudolaguvia shawi (Hora, 1921)

Synonyms
- Laguvia shawi Hora, 1921; Glyptothorax shawi (Hora, 1921)

= Pseudolaguvia shawi =

Species of fish

Pseudolaguvia shawi is a species of catfish in the family Erethistidae. It is found in the waters of Darjeeling, Siliguri Terai and Sikkim in India.

== Description ==
Pseudolaguvia shawi reaches a total length of 3.8 cm (1.5 in).

== Etymology ==
The species epithet is named in honour of naturalist G. E. Shaw, who collected the type specimen.
