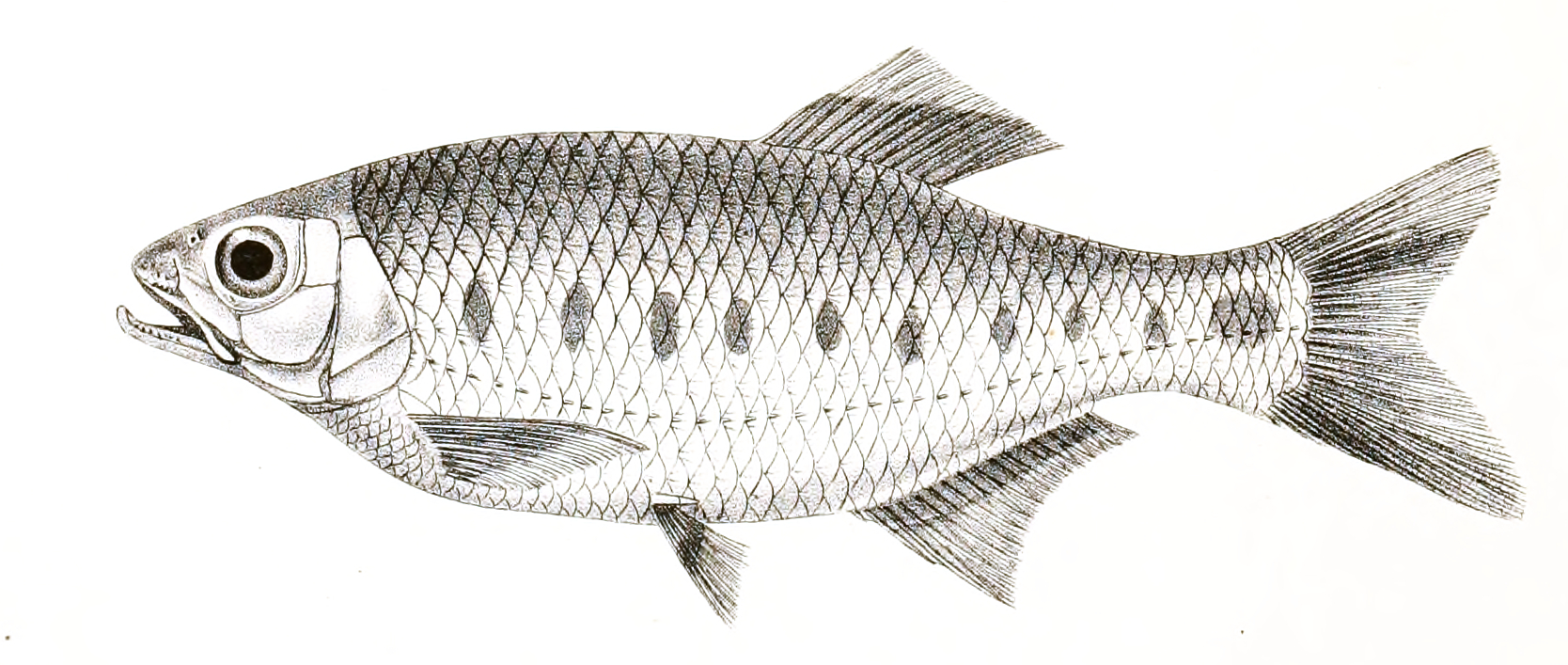

Conservation status
- Least Concern (IUCN 3.1)

Scientific classification
- Kingdom: Animalia
- Phylum: Chordata
- Class: Actinopterygii
- Order: Cypriniformes
- Family: Danionidae
- Genus: Opsarius
- Species: O. bakeri

Binomial name
- Opsarius bakeri (F. Day, 1865)

Synonyms
- Barilius bakeri

= Opsarius bakeri =

Species of fish

Opsarius bakeri is a fish in genus Opsarius of the family Danionidae.

== Distribution ==
It is found in many small mountain streams in Western Ghats of Kerala, as well as Indira Gandhi Wildlife Sanctuary in Karnataka, and the Chittar, Periyar, and Pampa river basins in Tamil Nadu.

== Description ==
The flanks are marked by a single row of bluish-green blotches along the length of the body, which get smaller as the fish ages. Dorsal and anal fins have a white margin. Males develop orange colouration below the lateral line, and nuptial tubercles on the head. Max length is 15 cm (5.9 in).

== Etymology ==
The fish is named in honor of British missionary Henry Baker, Jr. (1819–1878), who supplied several specimens from Mundikyum, Cochin, India.
