= Pseudolaguvia ribeiroi =

Conservation status
- Least Concern (IUCN 3.1)

Scientific classification
- Kingdom: Animalia
- Phylum: Chordata
- Class: Actinopterygii
- Order: Siluriformes
- Family: Sisoridae
- Genus: Pseudolaguvia
- Species: P. ribeiroi

Binomial name
- Pseudolaguvia ribeiroi (Hora, 1921)

Synonyms
- Laguvia ribeiroi Hora, 1921; Glyptothorax ribeiroi (Hora, 1921); Laguvia ribeiroi ribeiroi Hora, 1921; Glyptothorax riberoi (Hora, 1921); Laguvia rebeiroi Hora, 1921

Species of catfish

Pseudolaguvia ribeiroi, the painted catfish, is a species of catfish in the family Erethistidae. It is found in Nepal and India.

== Description ==
This species reaches a total length of 10 cm (4 in).

== Etymology ==
The species epithet is named for entomologist Sydney H. Ribeiro, of the Zoological Survey of India, who collected the type specimen.
