= Pseudolaguvia muricata =

Conservation status
- Data Deficient (IUCN 3.1)

Scientific classification
- Kingdom: Animalia
- Phylum: Chordata
- Class: Actinopterygii
- Order: Siluriformes
- Family: Sisoridae
- Genus: Pseudolaguvia
- Species: P. muricata

Binomial name
- Pseudolaguvia muricata H. H. Ng, 2005

Species of catfish

Pseudolaguvia muricata is a species of sisorid catfish in the family Erethistidae. It is found in the Brahmaputra River drainage of Bangladesh.

== Description ==
Pseudolaguvia muricata reaches a standard length of 2.6 cm (1 in).
