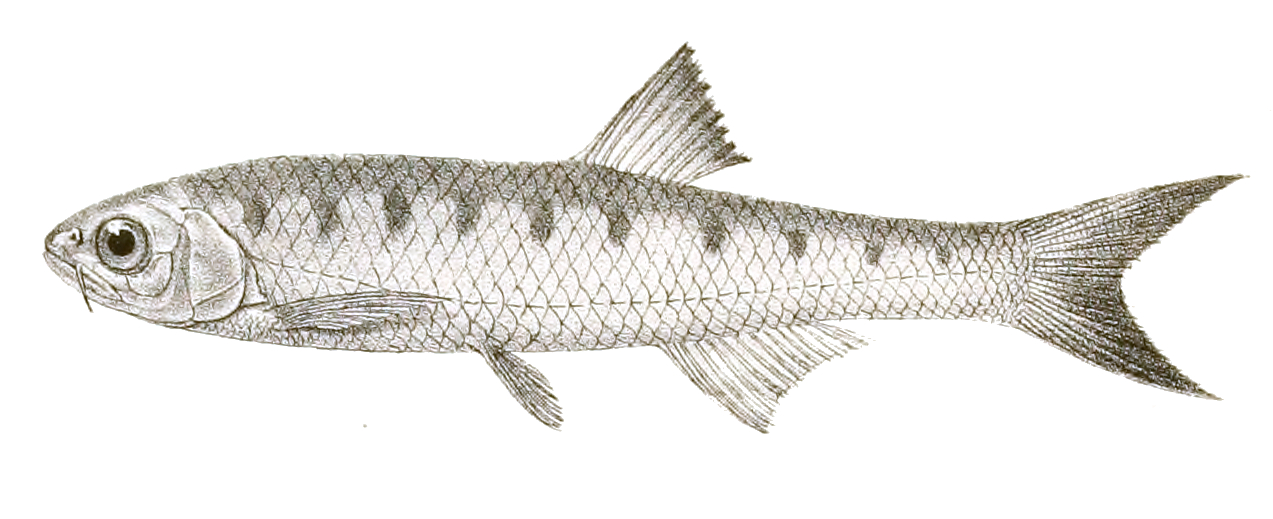

Conservation status
- Least Concern (IUCN 3.1)

Scientific classification
- Kingdom: Animalia
- Phylum: Chordata
- Class: Actinopterygii
- Order: Cypriniformes
- Family: Danionidae
- Genus: Barilius
- Species: B. vagra

Binomial name
- Barilius vagra (F. Hamilton, 1822)

= Barilius vagra =

Species of fish

Barilius vagra is a fish in genus Barilius of the family Cyprinidae.

== Description ==
This fish can grow to around 12.5 cm and is found in gravelly hill streams in Afghanistan, Pakistan, India, Nepal, Bangladesh and Sri Lanka.
