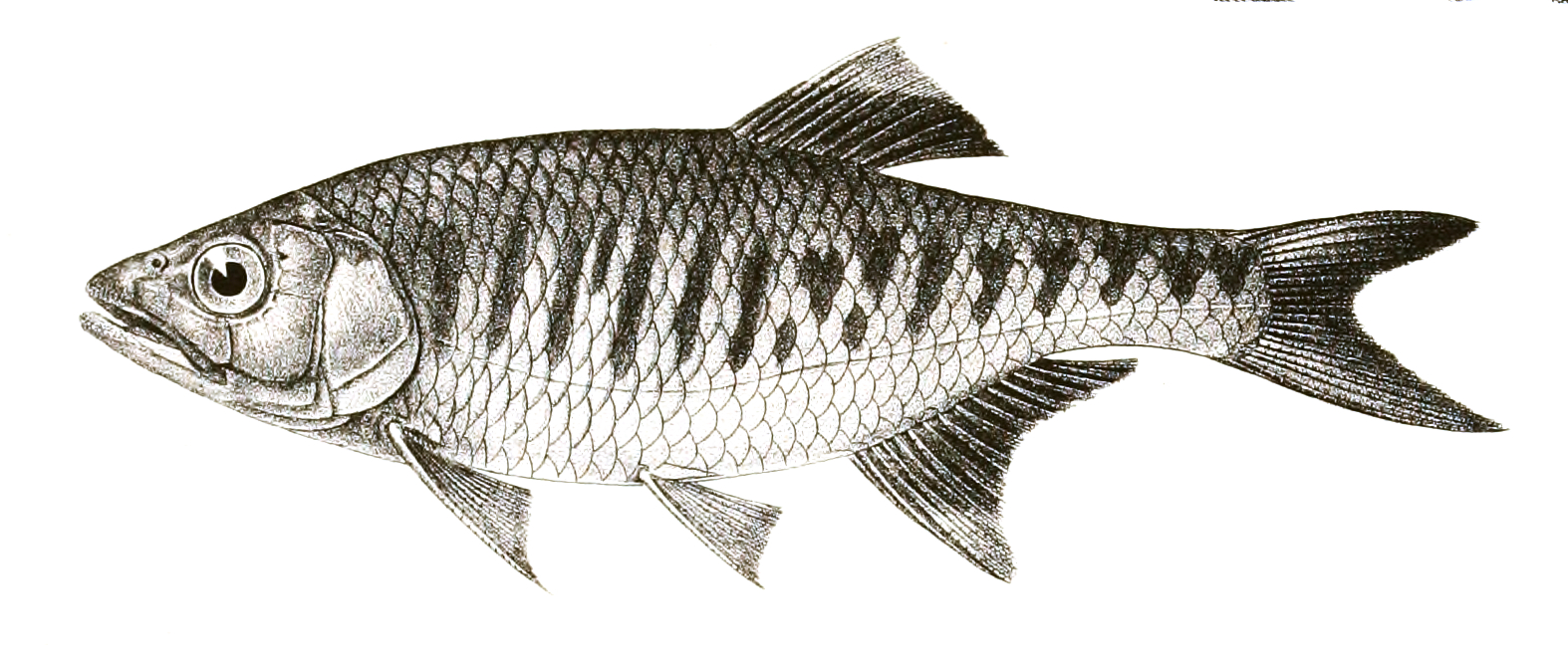

Conservation status
- Least Concern (IUCN 3.1)

Scientific classification
- Kingdom: Animalia
- Phylum: Chordata
- Class: Actinopterygii
- Order: Cypriniformes
- Family: Danionidae
- Genus: Opsarius
- Species: O. gatensis

Binomial name
- Opsarius gatensis (Valenciennes, 1844)

Synonyms
- Barilius gatensis Valenciennes, 1844

= Opsarius gatensis =

Species of fish

Opsarius gatensis, the Malabar baril, is a species of ray-finned fish belonging to the family Danionidae. This species is found in the Western Ghats in southern India.
