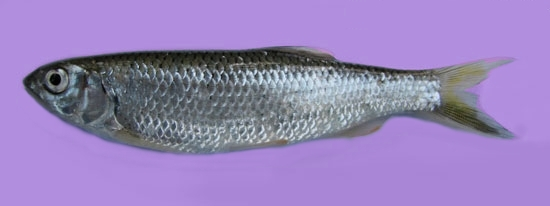

Conservation status
- Least Concern (IUCN 3.1)

Scientific classification
- Kingdom: Animalia
- Phylum: Chordata
- Class: Actinopterygii
- Order: Cypriniformes
- Family: Danionidae
- Genus: Barilius
- Species: B. barila

Binomial name
- Barilius barila (F. Hamilton, 1822)

= Barilius barila =

Species of fish

Barilius barila, Baraalee (Bengali: বারালি) is a tropical fish in genus Barilius of the family Cyprinidae. It is commercially very important due to its superior taste. It is found in the Asian countries of India, Nepal, Bangladesh and Myanmar. Normally found in clear streams in the foothills. Its maximum length is 10 cm.
