= Opsarius malabaricus =

Scientific classification
- Kingdom: Animalia
- Phylum: Chordata
- Class: Actinopterygii
- Order: Cypriniformes
- Family: Danionidae
- Genus: Opsarius
- Species: O. malabaricus

Binomial name
- Opsarius malabaricus (Jerdon, 1849)

Synonyms
- Barilius malabaricus Jerdon, 1849

Species of fish

Opsarius malabaricus is a species of freshwater ray-finned fish belonging to the family Danionidae. It is found in the Payaswini and Vallapattanam rivers in India.
