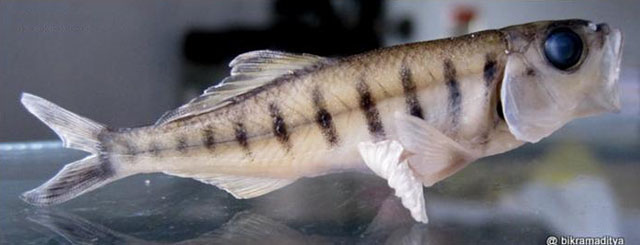

Conservation status
- Least Concern (IUCN 3.1)

Scientific classification
- Kingdom: Animalia
- Phylum: Chordata
- Class: Actinopterygii
- Order: Cypriniformes
- Family: Danionidae
- Subfamily: Chedrinae
- Genus: Opsarius
- Species: O. barna

Binomial name
- Opsarius barna (F. Hamilton, 1822)

Synonyms
- Cyprinus barna Hamilton, 1822; Barilius barna (Hamilton, 1822); Leuciscus barna (Hamilton, 1822); Opsarius acanthopterus McClelland, 1839; Leuciscus acanthopterus (McClelland, 1839); Opsarius fasciatus McClelland, 1839; Opsarius latipinnatus McClelland, 1839; Barilius papillatus Day, 1869; Barilius jayarami Barman, 1985

= Barna baril =

Species of fish

The Barna baril (Opsarius barna) is a fish in genus Opsarius of the family Danionidae. It is found in India, Nepal, Bangladesh and Myanmar.

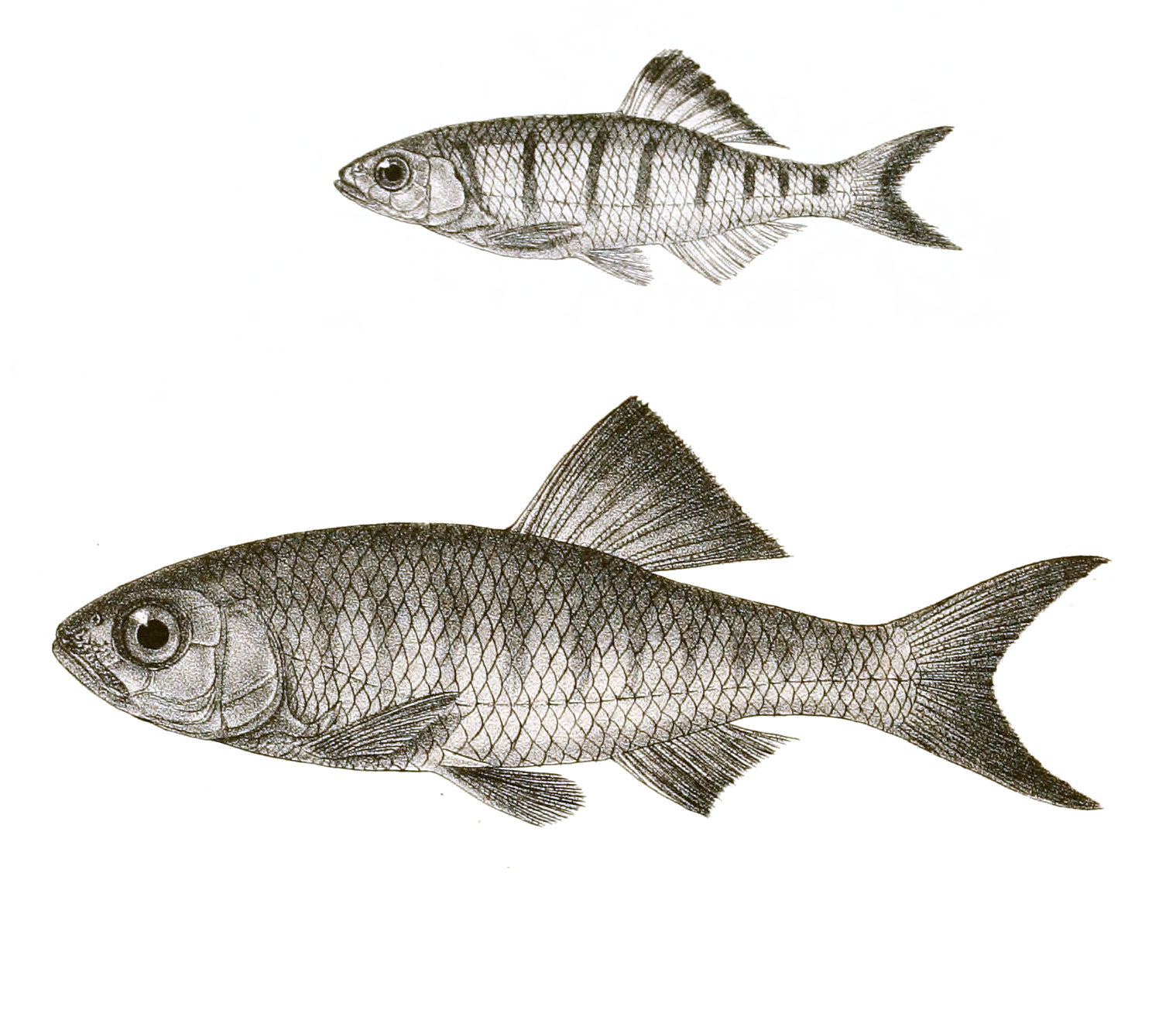

== Description ==
This species can grow to around 15 cm and inhabits clear gravelly hill streams.
