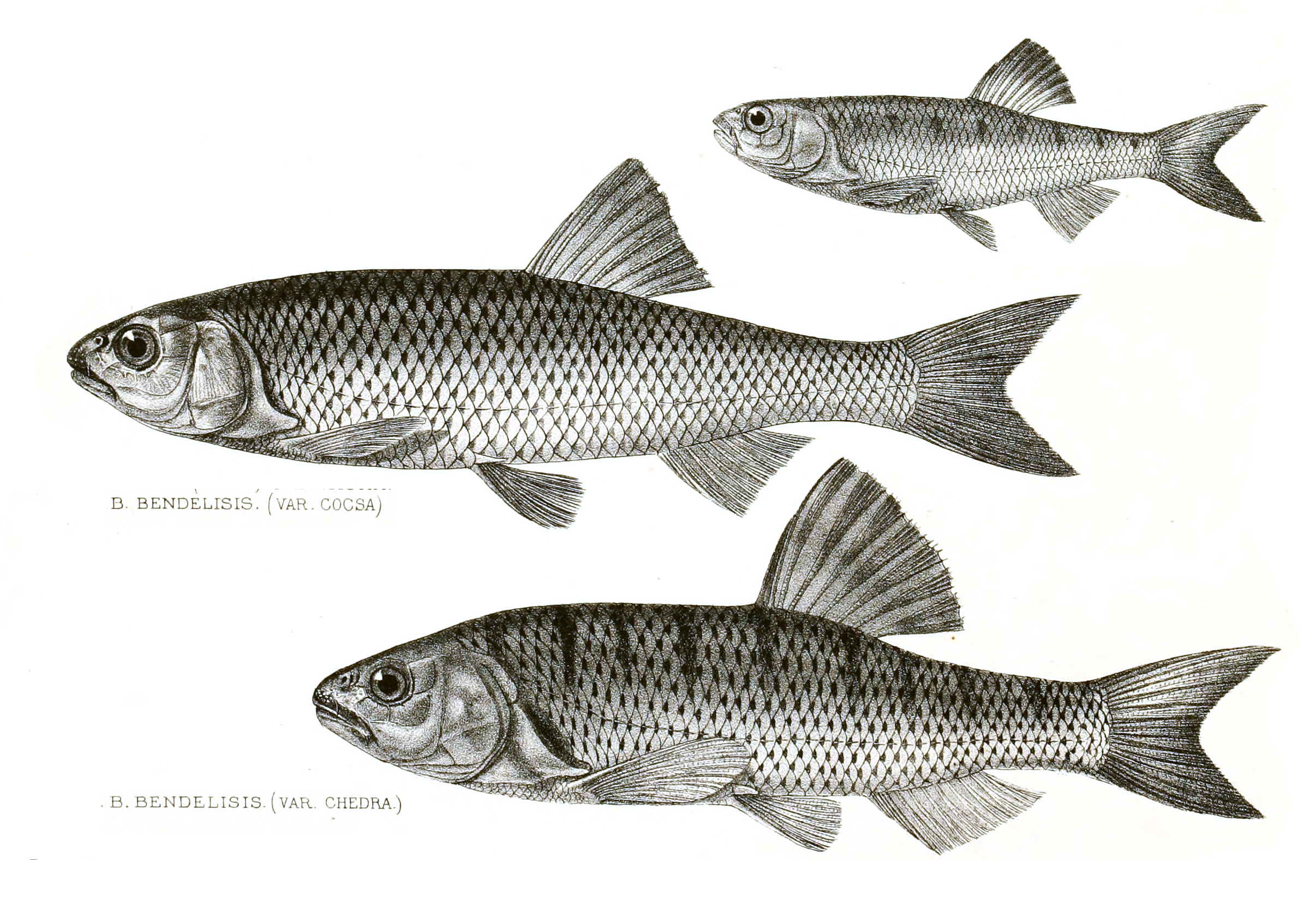

Conservation status
- Least Concern (IUCN 3.1)

Scientific classification
- Kingdom: Animalia
- Phylum: Chordata
- Class: Actinopterygii
- Order: Cypriniformes
- Family: Danionidae
- Genus: Opsarius
- Species: O. bendelisis

Binomial name
- Opsarius bendelisis (Hamilton, 1807)

Synonyms
- Barilius bendelisis Hamilton, 1807

= Opsarius bendelisis =

Species of fish

Opsarius bendelisis is a fish in genus Opsarius of the family Danionidae. It is found in Pakistan, India, Nepal, Bangladesh, Sri Lanka, Bhutan and Myanmar.
