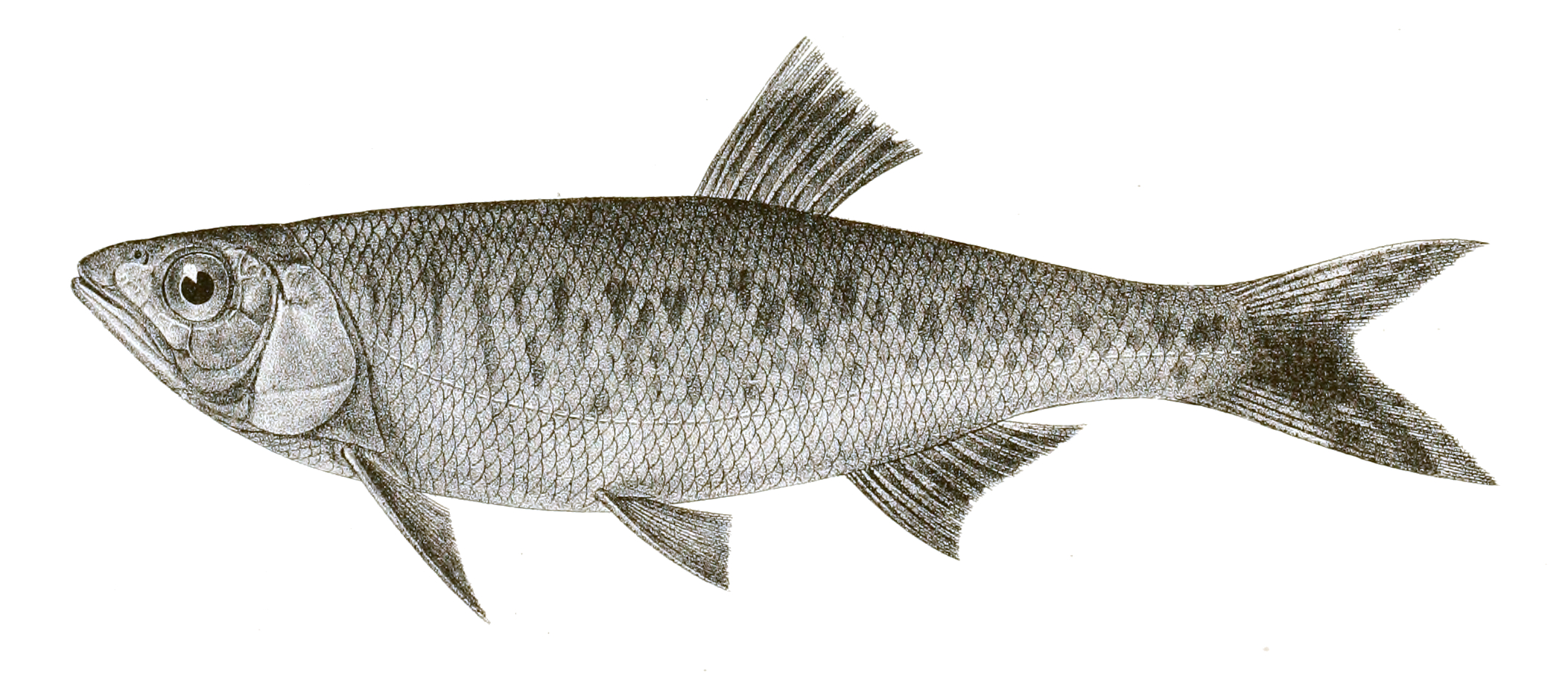

Conservation status
- Least Concern (IUCN 3.1)

Scientific classification
- Kingdom: Animalia
- Phylum: Chordata
- Class: Actinopterygii
- Order: Cypriniformes
- Family: Danionidae
- Subfamily: Chedrinae
- Genus: Opsarius
- Species: O. tileo

Binomial name
- Opsarius tileo (F. Hamilton, 1822)

Synonyms
- Cyprinus tileo Hamilton, 1822; Barilius tileo (Hamilton, 1822); Opsarius brachialis McClelland, 1839; Leuciscus brachialis (McClelland, 1839); Barilius menoni Sen, 1976

= Opsarius tileo =

Species of fish

Opsarius tileo is a species of freshwater ray-finned fish belonging to the family Danionidae. This fish is found in India, Bangladesh and Nepal, and probably Myanmar.
