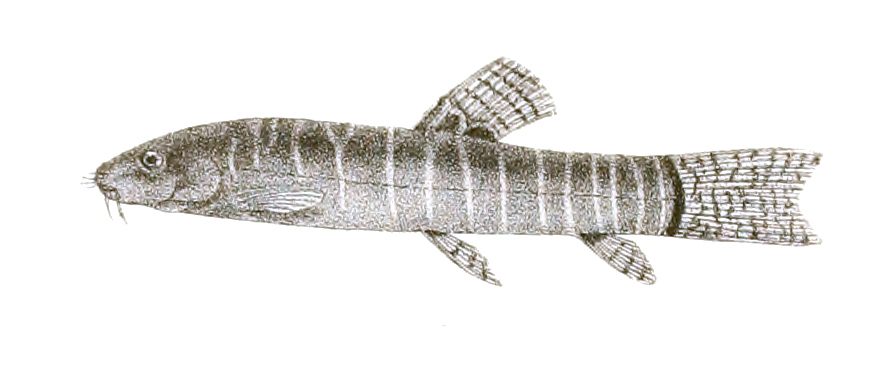

Conservation status
- Least Concern (IUCN 3.1)

Scientific classification
- Kingdom: Animalia
- Phylum: Chordata
- Class: Actinopterygii
- Division: Teleostei
- Order: Cypriniformes
- Family: Nemacheilidae
- Genus: Acoura; Swainson, 1839
- Species: A. obscura

Binomial name
- Acoura obscura (F. Hamilton, 1822)

Synonyms
- Cobitis savona Hamilton, 1822; Nemacheilus savona (Hamilton, 1822); Noemacheilus savona (Hamilton, 1822); Schistura savona (Hamilton, 1822); Cobites (Acoura) obscura Swainson, 1839

= Acoura =

Species of fish

Acoura savona is a species of ray-finned fish in the family Nemacheilidae. It is found along the eastern Himalaya in the Tista drainage at Darjeeling through Nepal, to Ghaghara and Kali drainages in Uttar Pradesh where it occurs in fast flowing hill streams with gravel beds. The specific name savona is a latinisation and contraction of the Bengali name for this species savon khorka. The genus was resurrected from synonymy with Schistura as a monotypic genus in 2026.
