= Baini Prashad =

Indian zoologist (1894–1969)

Sunder Lal Hora FRSE FLS

Director of the Zoological Survey of India
- In office May 1947 – December 1955
- Preceded by: R.B.S. Sewell
- Succeeded by: Sundar Lal Hora

Personal details
- Born: 13 March 1894 Kirtarpur, British Punjab
- Died: 18 January 1969 (aged 74) Calcutta, West Bengal, India
- Occupation: Ichthyologist

Baini Prashad OBE FRSE (13 March 1894 – 18 January 1969) was an Indian zoologist who specialized chiefly in malacology and ichthyology. He served as the first Indian director of the Zoological Survey of India, succeeding R.B.S. Sewell. He was also a scholar of Persian and took an interest in the history of zoology.

Prashad was born at Kirtarpur to Rai Sahib Devi Das, who was an administrative officer in the government in Punjab. His paternal grandfather Rai Sahib Gopal Das had been a commissioner. Prashad studied in Lahore and graduated from the Government College in Lahore in 1913 followed by a MSc in 1914. He worked on a Ph.D. under J. Stephenson, a specialist on annelids and professor of Zoology and was the first person to receive a non-honorary D.Sc. degree from Punjab University in 1918. His research was on the calciferous glands of earthworms. In 1927 he also received a D.Sc. from the University of Edinburgh. He was appointed to the department of fisheries in Calcutta in 1918 during which time he collaborated with T. Southwell on research on the Indian shad Hilsa ilisha and its parasites. Prashad became the third permanent director of the ZSI and the first Indian to hold the position following the retirement of Lieutenant-Colonel Sewell in 1934. In 1942, while Prashad was director, Calcutta was threatened by a Japanese air attack and the specimen collections were shifted to Varanasi, but some of the fish and insect specimens were damaged due to floods during September 1943. Prashad worked on a wide range of taxa including substantial work on the termite fauna of India. Prashad became an advisor to the government of India in 1947 and was succeeded by Sundar Lal Hora as director of the Zoological Survey of India.

Prashad also helped translate The Maathir-Ul-Umarâ, a biography of Timurid rulers from Persian to English. Prashad was a Stephenson Research Gold Medallist and a recipient of the Joy Gobind Law Gold Medal of the Asiatic Society of Bengal. He was appointed an Officer of the Order of the British Empire (OBE) in the 1942 Birthday Honours. Prashad is commemorated in the scientific name of a species of Indian gecko, Hemidactylus prashadi.

His grandson is the historian and journalist Vijay Prashad.

== Publications ==
A partial list of publications includes the following:

- Prashad, B. (1918). "Studies on the anatomy of Indian Mollusca No. 2. The marsupium and glochidium of some Unionidae and on the Indian species hitherto assigned to the genus Nodularia ". Records of the Indian Museum 15: 143-148.
- Prashad, B. (1918). "The description and life-history of a new species of Anopheles that breeds in holes in trees". Rec. Indian Mus. 15: 123-127.
- Prashad, B. (1918). "The Anatomy of a Chironomid larvae of the genus Polypedilum ". Rec. Indian Mus. 14: 71-74.
- Prashad, B. (1918). "The middle ear of Indian frogs". Rec. Indian Mus. 15: 97-104.
- Prashad, B. (1918). "Contribution to the anatomy of aquatic Diptera No. 1". Rec. Indian Mus. 15: 153-158
- Prashad, B. (1919). "On the generic position of some Asiatic Unionidae". Rec. Indian Mus. 16: 403-411.
- Prashad, B. (1919). "On a new species of Discognathus from the Kangra Valley". Rec. Indian Mus. 16: 163-165.
- Prashad, B.; Southwell, T. (1919). "Notes from the Bengal Fisheries Laboratory No. 6. Embryological and development studies of Indian fishes". Rec. Indian Mus. 16: 215-240.
- Prashad, B. (1919). "Studies on the anatomy of Indian Mollusca No. 3. The soft parts of some Indian Unionidae". Rec. Indian Mus. 16: 289-296.
- Prashad, B. (1920). "The gross anatomy of Corbicula fluminalis (Müller)". Rec. Indian Mus. 18: 209-211.
- Prashad, B.; Southwell, T. (1920). "A revision of the Indian Species of the genus Phyllobothrium ". Rec. Indian Mus. 19: 1-8.
- Prashad, B. (1920). "Notes from the Bengal Fisheries Laboratory No. 7. On some Indian Torpedinidae from the Orissa Coast". Rec. Indian Mus. 19: 97-106.
- Prashad, B. (1920). "Notes on Lamellibranchs in the Indian Museum, Nos. 1-2". Rec. Indian Mus. 19: 165-174.
- Prashad, B. (1921). "Notes on Lamellibranchs in the Indian Museum, No. 3". Rec. Indian Mus. 22: 111-120.
- Prashad, B. (1921). "Notes on Lamellibranchs in the Indian Museum, Nos. 4 & 5". Rec. Indian Mus. 22: 137-149.
- Prashad, B. (1921). "Report on a collection of Sumatran Molluscs from fresh and brackish water". Rec. Indian Mus. 22: 461-508.
- Prashad, B. (1922). "A revision of the Burmese Unionidae". Rec. Indian Mus. 24: 91-111.
- Prashad, B. (1928). "Recent and fossil viviparidae. A study in distribution, evolution and palaeogeography" (PDF). Memoirs of the Indian Museum. 8: 153–251.
- Prashad, B. (1932). "Some Noteworthy Examples of Parallel Evolution in the Molluscan Faunas of South-eastern Asia and South America". Proceedings of the Royal Society of Edinburgh 51: 42-53. doi:10.1017/S0370164600022987
- Prashad, B. (1933). "A revision of the Indian Nuculidae". Archiv für Naturgeschichte, Neue Floge 2: 124-135.
- Prashad, B. (1936). "Animal remains from Harappa". No. 51. Archaeological Survey of India.
- Prashad, B. (editor) (1938). The Progress of Science in India during the Past Twenty-Five Years. Indian Science Congress Association.

== Taxa described by him ==
- See Category:Taxa named by Baini Prashad

== Taxa named in his honor ==
- A loach, Schistura prashadi Hora, 1921
- the Bombay leaf-toed gecko, Hemidactylus prashadi, also known commonly as or Prashad's gecko.
