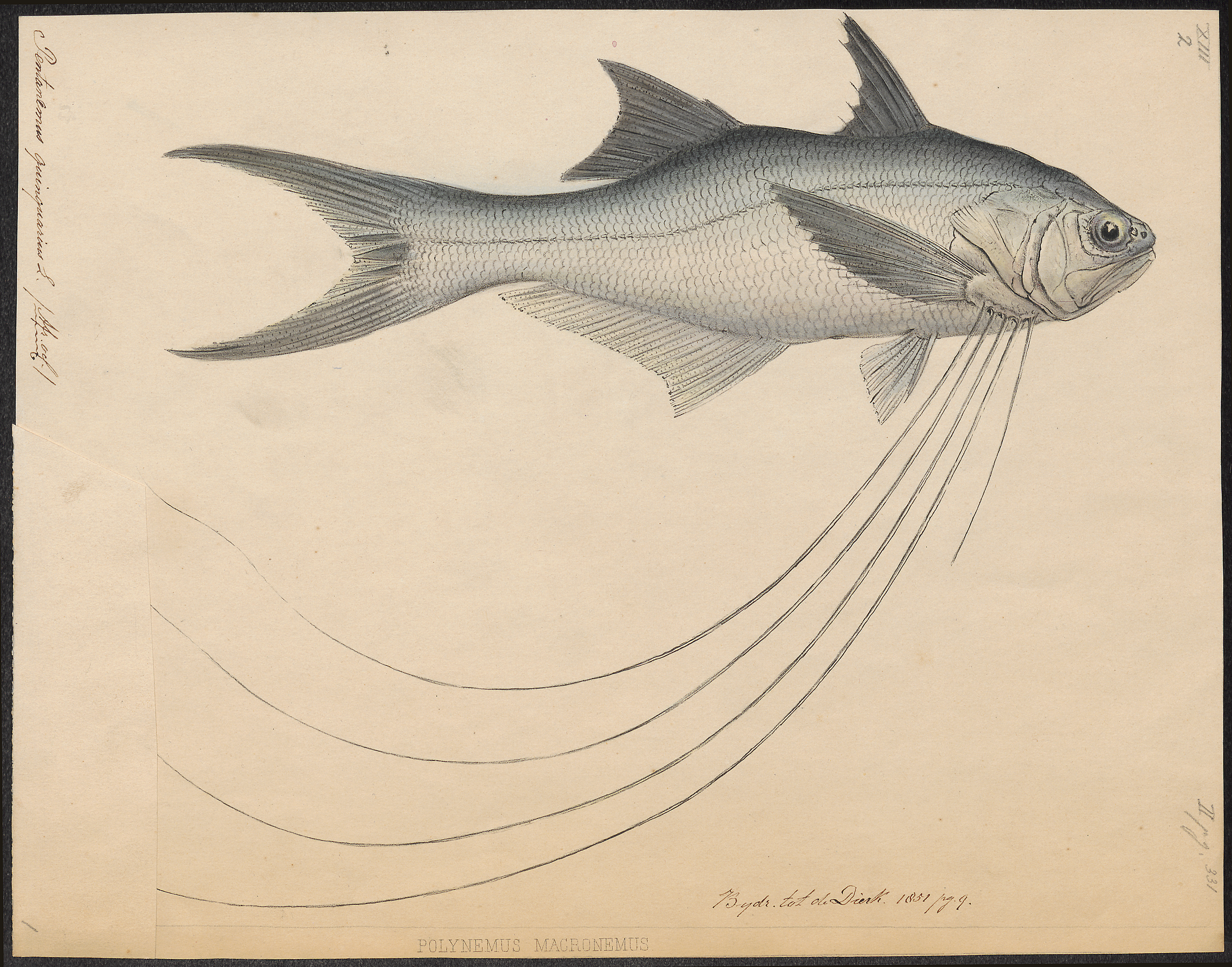

Conservation status
- Vulnerable (IUCN 3.1)

Scientific classification
- Kingdom: Animalia
- Phylum: Chordata
- Class: Actinopterygii
- Division: Teleostei
- Order: Carangiformes
- Suborder: Pleuronectoidei
- Family: Polynemidae
- Genus: Pentanemus
- Species: P. quinquarius

Binomial name
- Pentanemus quinquarius (Linnaeus, 1758

Synonyms
- Polynemus quinquarius Linnaeus, 1758; Polynemus artedii Bennett, 1831; Polynemus macronemus Pel, 1851; Polynemus peli Njock, 1990

= Royal threadfin =

Species of fish

The royal threadfin (Pentanemus quinquarius) is a species of ray-finned fish, a threadfin from the family Polynemidae, the threadfins. It is found in the eastern Atlantic Ocean along the western coast of Africa.

== Description ==
The royal threadfin is a medium-sized threadfin species reaching a maximum total length of 35 centimetres (14 in), although a more normal length is 25 centimetres (9.8 in). It has two separate dorsal fins, the first dorsal fin has 8 spines and the second dorsal fin has a single spine and 14 or 15 soft rays. The anal fin contains 3 spines and 24 to 30 soft rays, with a base which is longer than that of the second dorsal-fin. The pectoral fin has 14 to 16 unbranched rays and is 30% to 42% of the fish's standard length with its tip extending to or just short of the centre of the base of the anal fin. The pectoral fin is situated far below the midline of body. There are 5 pectoral filaments, the first being the shortest and this filament just reaches to or extends beyond the start of the anal fin. The remaining pectoral filaments reach well past the ends of lobes of the caudal fins with the third filament being the longest being 2.5-3 times the standard length. The caudal fin is deeply forked and the lobes are not fialmented, the length of the upper lobe is 36% to 46% of the standard length and lower lobe is 38 %to 47% of the standard length. There are 68-76 pored scales in the simple lateral line which extends from upper end of gill opening to the middle of the caudal fin fork. The upper sides of its head and body tinged with gold, this changes to silver on the lower flanks. The margins of both dorsal fins and the caudal fins are black, the rest of these fins are blackish while pelvic and anal fins are white. The pectoral fin is yellow with melanophores. The base of pectoral filaments is white, darkening towards their tips.

== Distribution ==
The royal threadfin is found in the eastern Atlantic Ocean where it occurs along the western coast of Africa from Senegal to Angola. It has been recorded from Cape Verde and Mauritania. A record from Cuba of a half grown fish from the mid-nineteenth century remains the only record from the western Atlantic Ocean.

== Habitat and biology ==
The royal threadfin occurs over muddy substrates in shallow coastal waters between 10 and 70 metres (33 and 230 ft) in depth. It is also often recorded in estuaries and lagoons. It is a carnivorous fish and its diet consists of crustaceans and small fish. Spawning takes place off Lagos throughout the year but peaks in the dry season and nearly stops altogether during the rainy season. Unlike other threadfins this species has a small proportion of the population which are hermaphroditic. It is also relatively short lived and few fish survive beyond 2 years of age.

== Fisheries ==
The royal threadfin is mainly taken as by-catch off Lagos by shrimp beam trawlers, but it is still commercially important. Most of the fish caught are subadults and this pattern is likely replicated throughout West Africa where it is one of the most important commercial species in this region> It is caught using trawls, but also by gillnet and beach seine. In Senegal, it is regarded as less valuable due to its smaller size and lower abundance than the lesser African threadfin.
