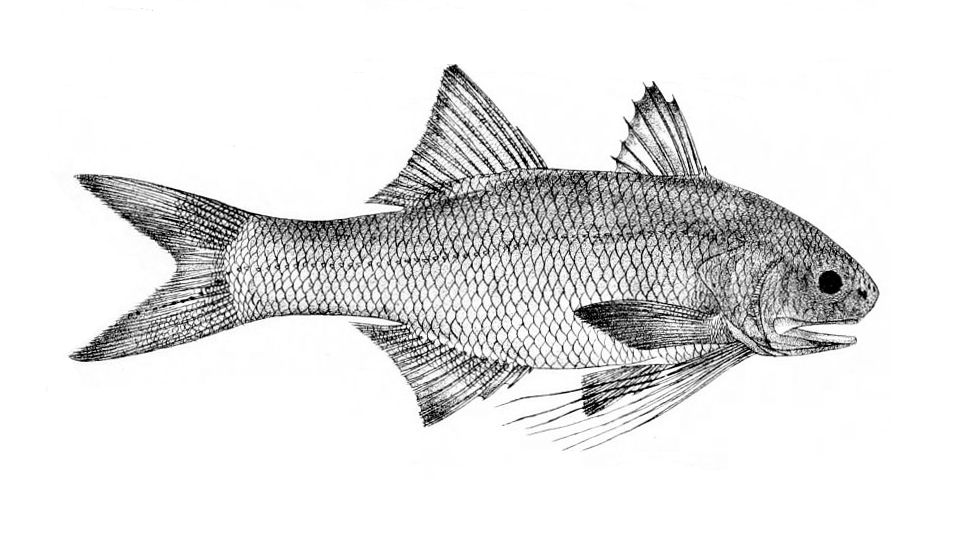
- Filimanus heptadactyla

Scientific classification
- Kingdom: Animalia
- Phylum: Chordata
- Class: Actinopterygii
- Order: Carangiformes
- Suborder: Pleuronectoidei
- Family: Polynemidae
- Genus: Filimanus; Myers, 1936

Type species
- Filimanus perplexa Feltes, 1991

= Filimanus =

Genus of fishes

Filimanus is a genus of marine ray-finned fishes, threadfins from the family Polynemidae.

== Features ==
The fishes of the genus Filimanus have a body which is oblong to moderately deep and compressed. They have a well developed adipose eyelid and the diameter of the eye is longer than the length of the snout. They have a well developed lip on their lower jaws and the teeth on the dentary bone are restricted to its dorsal surface. There are narrow bands of villiform teeth on their jaws, palatine bone and ectopterygoids. The rear joint of the mouth extends past the level of rear margin of the adipose eyelid. The rear margin of the gill cover is serrated. They have two dorsal fins with the first dorsal fin having 8 spines and the second dorsal fin has a single spine and 11 to 13 soft rays while the anal fin has 3 spines and 10 to 15 soft rays. The base of the anal fin is shorter than the length of the head. The pectoral fin contains 13 to 16 unbranched rays and it is placed below the midline of body. The caudal fin is deeply forked but its lobes do not have filaments.

== Distribution and habitat ==
Filimanus species are found in the Indian and western Pacific Ocean, where they are found in waters of depths of 1 to 80 metres (3.3 to 262.5 ft) in depth over sandy and muddy substrates, often found in estuaries.

== Species ==
The following species are classified as within the genus Filimanus:

- Filimanus heptadactyla (Cuvier, 1829) (Sevenfinger threadfin)
- Filimanus hexanema (Cuvier 1829) (Javanese threadfin)
- Filimanus perplexa Feltes 1991 (Splendid threadfin)
- Filimanus sealei (Jordan & Richardson, 1910) (Eightfinger threadfin)
- Filimanus similis Feltes 1991 (Indian sevenfinger threadfin)
- Filimanus xanthonema (Valenciennes, 1831) (Yellowthread threadfin)

== Type species ==
Filimanus was described as new genus by George S. Myers in 1936 with its only species being based on a single specimen which he identified as Polynemus melanochir but which was subsequently found to be a misidentification and P. melanochir is a valid species now classified in the genus Polydactylus which meant that Myers specimen remained undescribed. Subsequently Ross M. Feltes described it as Filimanus perplexa and added 5 other species to this new genus. Opinion 1761 of the International Commission on Zoological Nomenclature confirmed F. perplexa as the type species of Myers's genus.
