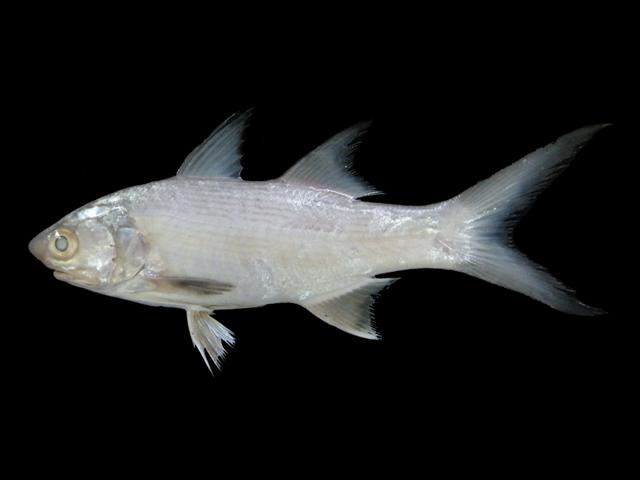
- Filistriatus plebeius

Scientific classification
- Kingdom: Animalia
- Phylum: Chordata
- Class: Actinopterygii
- Order: Carangiformes
- Suborder: Pleuronectoidei
- Family: Polynemidae
- Genus: Filistriatus; Girard et al., 2025

= Filistriatus =

Genus of ray-finned fishes

Filistriatus is a genus of marine ray-finned fish from the family Polynemidae, the threadfins. Members of the genus are found across the Indo-Pacific, from the coast of East Africa to Hawaii. They were previously included in the genus Polydactylus, but were moved to a separate genus by Girard and Chovanec in 2025, because Polydactylus is otherwise non-monophyletic.

== Species ==
- Filistriatus bifurcus (Motomura et al., 2001) (Slender fivefinger threadfin)
- Filistriatus plebeius (Broussonet, 1782) (Striped threadfin)
- Filistriatus sexfilis (Valenciennes, 1831) (Sixfinger threadfin) (Type)
- Filistriatus siamensis (Motomura et al., 2001) (Largemouth striped threadfin)
