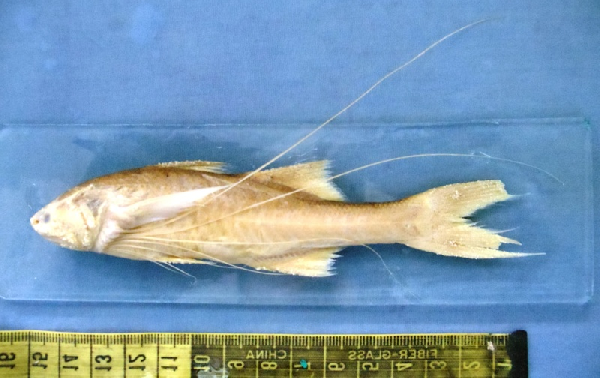
- preserved specimen Pakistan

Conservation status
- Least Concern (IUCN 3.1)

Scientific classification
- Kingdom: Animalia
- Phylum: Chordata
- Class: Actinopterygii
- Division: Teleostei
- Order: Carangiformes
- Suborder: Pleuronectoidei
- Family: Polynemidae
- Genus: Polynemus
- Species: P. paradiseus

Binomial name
- Polynemus paradiseus Linnaeus 1758

Synonyms
- Polynemus risua Hamilton, 1822; Polynemus aureus Hamilton, 1822; Polynemus toposui Hamilton, 1822; Polynemus longifilis Cuvier, 1829

= Paradise threadfin =

Species of fish

Paradise threadfins swimming in captivity.

The paradise threadfin (Polynemus paradiseus) is a species of catadromous ray-finned fish, a threadfin from the family Polynemidae which is found in south and southeast Asia in freshwater rivers where it is a valued food fish.

== Description ==
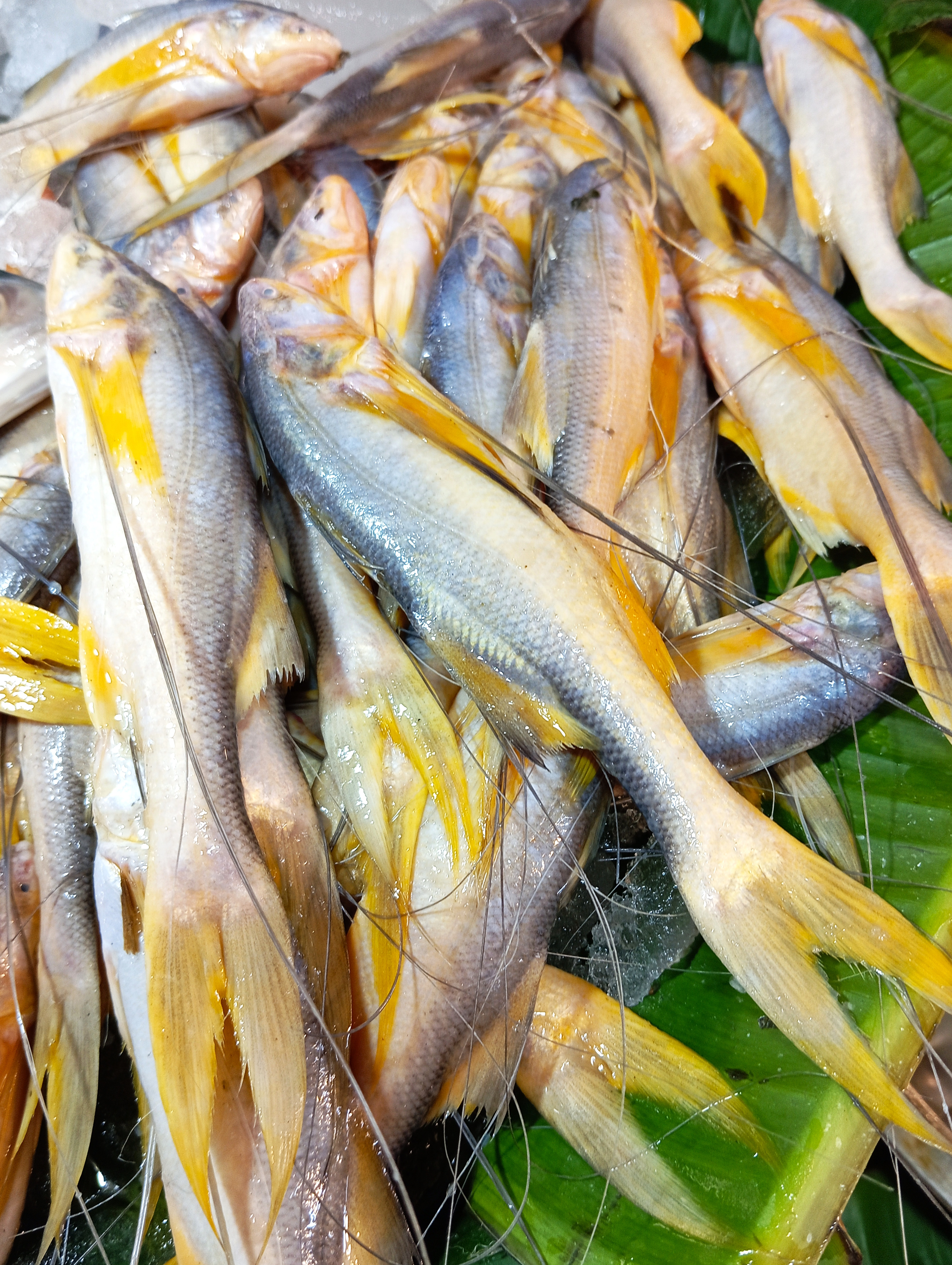
Paradise threadfin (Polynemus paradiseus) selling in Kolkata market, West Bengal, India

The paradise threadfin is a medium-sized species of threadfin which attains a maximum length of 30 centimetres (12 in), although the type of measurement used was not given, a more normal length is a total length of 17 centimetres (6.7 in). It has a pointed snout and the head's dorsal profile is almost horizontal. There are two separate dorsal fins, the first dorsal fin has 8 spines with each one having a base of a similar size to the others. The second dorsal fin contains a single spine and 14 or 15 soft rays. The anal fin has 2 spines and normally has 12 soft rays, its base is shorter in length than the base of the second dorsal-fin. The pectoral fins contain 15 to 18 unbranched rays and its tip almost reaches to the origin of the anal fin origin, although it is relatively longer in juvenile. There are 7 pectoral filaments the longest being up to 2.5 times the standard length. The caudal fin is deeply forked and neither of its lobs are filamentous. The lateral-line is simple and runs from the upper end of the gill slit to the middle of the rear margin of the caudal fin, the lateral line contains 66-71 pored scales. The head and body are greyish-black above and yellow below, The front parts of both dorsal fins are greyish black with the rest of the fins being pale yellow. The pectoral and pelvic fins are completely a vivid yellow. The pectoral filaments are bright yellow at their base fading to whitish yellow at their tips. The anal fin is wholly coloured yellow. The rear edge of the caudal fin is yellow and the rest of the tail is greyish black.

== Distribution ==
The paradise threadfin is found in the Indo-Pacific region. It occurs from Pakistan, on both coasts of India, the Bay of Bengal and the Philippines. It countries it has been recorded from include Pakistan, India, Sri Lanka, Bangladesh, Myanmar, Thailand, Cambodia, Vietnam, Indonesia and the Philippines. In India it is found in the basins of the Brahmaputra and the Ganges and in Indonesia it has only been recorded from Sumatra, although these needs confirmation. Its presence in Malaysia is uncertain.

== Habitat and biology ==
The paradise threadfin occurs where there are sand substrates in estuaries and in offshore waters down to depths of 27 metres (89 ft) but it breeds in fresh water so it has to regularly migrate into rivers. It is a carnivorous species which feeds on crustaceans, small fishes and benthic organisms. This species has separate sexes and there is no evidence of hermaphroditism. It is thought that paradise threadfins in the Hooghly River spawn from April to September and females sampled during October are almost all spent.

== Fisheries ==
The paradise threadfin is one of the most important species for fisheries in eastern India and in Myanmar.
