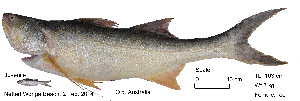

Scientific classification
- Kingdom: Animalia
- Phylum: Chordata
- Class: Actinopterygii
- Order: Carangiformes
- Suborder: Pleuronectoidei
- Family: Polynemidae
- Genus: Polydactylus
- Species: P. macrochir

Binomial name
- Polydactylus macrochir (Günther, 1867)

Synonyms
- Polynemus macrochir Günther, 1867; Polynemus sheridani Macleay, 1884; Polydactylus sheridani (Macleay, 1884)

= King threadfin =

Species of fish

The king threadfin (Polydactylus macrochir), also known as the blind salmon, blink tassel-fish, burnett salmon, gold threadfin, king salmon, kingfish, Sheridan threadfin, striped tassel fish, or threadfin salmon, is a species of marine ray-finned fish, a threadfin from the family Polynemidae which is found in southern New Guinea and northern Australia.

== Description ==
The king threadfin is a large threadfin which can attain a maximum total length of 170 centimetres (67 in) and a maximum published weight of 45 kilograms (99 lb), although the more common total length is 48 centimetres (19 in). It has a pointed snout and the dorsal profile of the head is almost flat in young fish and concave in adults. There are two separate dorsal fins, the first dorsal fin has 8 spines and the second spine is thicker than others. The second dorsal fin has a single spine and 11 to 13 soft rays. The anal fin has 3 spines and 10 to 12 soft rays, the base of the anal fin base is roughly equal in length to the base of the second dorsal fin base. The pectoral fin has 14 or 15 unbranched rays, and has a length equivalent to roughly a quarter of the standard length with its tip just falling short or just reaching the tip of the pelvic fin. There are 5 pectoral filaments with first filament being the shortest, reaching past the level of origin of the pelvic fin. The second pectoral filament extends to past the tip of the pelvic fin. The third and fifth pectoral filaments extend past the level of the origin of the anal fin. The fourth pectoral filament is the longest, having a length equivalent to 40 to 53% of the standard length and this filament extends far beyond the level of the origin of the anal fin. The caudal fin is deeply forked with neither of its lobes being filamentous. There are 60-76 pored scales on its lateral line which is simple In form and extends from the upper end of the gill slit to the upper end of lower caudal fin lobe. The upper sides of head and the flanks are tinged golden silver, becoming silvery on the lower flanks. Both dorsal fins are pale brown, the pectoral and pelvic fins are vivid yellow. The front portion of the anal fin is yellow, the remainder being yellowish white. The pectoral filaments are white or yellowish white. The tail is greyish with a greyish black rear margin.

== Distribution ==
The king threadfin is found in the eastern Indian Ocean and the western Pacific Ocean. It is found in southern New Guinea and northern Australia. In Australia its range extends from Eighty Mile Beach in Western Australia to the Brisbane River in Queensland. In New Guinea its range extends along the southern coast from Western New Guinea, Indonesia, to the Gulf of Papua in Papua New Guinea.

== Habitat and biology ==
King threadfin occur in shallow, turbid waters such as coastal waters, estuaries, mangrove creeks, and mangrove-lined rivers, over sandbanks and mud substrates. It normally aggregates into loose schools, however, the larger individuals are more frequently recorded as pairs or as individuals. This is a carnivorous species which feeds on prawns and fish. It is a protandrous hermaphrodite and fish between fork lengths of 70 and 100 centimetres (28 and 39 in) appear to be transitional hermaphrodites in that they have mature male and immature female reproductive organs, and they function reproductively as males. King threadfins in the process of transitioning are most frequently recorded from June to September. The females spawn pelagic eggs but little is known about the larvae although the nursery areas are inshore, shallow and of low salinity.

== Fisheries ==
The king threadfin is one of the most important species in the fisheries in the Northern Territory, Queensland and Western Australia and it is caught mostly using coastal set gillnets, and also using fixed tidal traps, beach seines, ring nets and handlines. The fishery in the southern part of the Gulf of Carpentaria is dominated by males in the age range 3-6 years old. In the Gulf of Carpentaria between 1980 and 1987 the gillnet fishery landings of this species equalled an average 30% by weight of total landings. It is a popular sport fishing quarry too and in Queensland and Western Australia there are minimum sizes which can be taken and a bag limit.

== Species description ==
Polydactylus macrochir was first formally described as Polynemus macrochir in 1867 by Albert Günther who gave the type locality as New South Wales, thought to be an error for Queensland.
