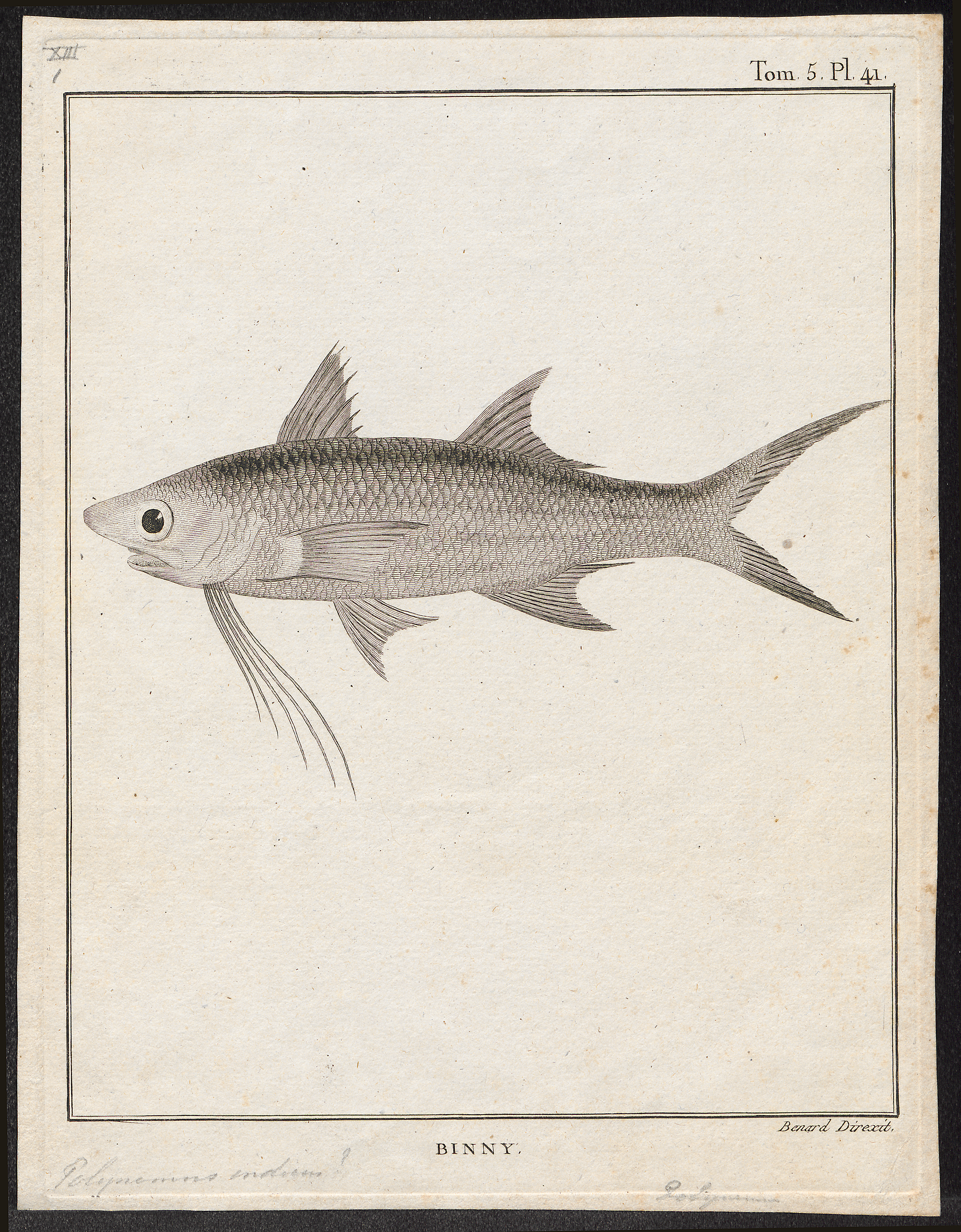

Scientific classification
- Kingdom: Animalia
- Phylum: Chordata
- Class: Actinopterygii
- Order: Carangiformes
- Suborder: Pleuronectoidei
- Family: Polynemidae
- Genus: Leptomelanosoma; Motomura & Iwatsuki, 2001
- Species: L. indicum

Binomial name
- Leptomelanosoma indicum (Shaw, 1804)

Synonyms
- Polynemus indicus Shaw, 1804; Polydactylus indicus (Shaw, 1804); Trichidion indicum (Shaw, 1804); Trichidion indicus (Shaw, 1804); Polynemus sele Hamilton, 1822; Polynemus uronemus Cuvier, 1829; Polynemus gelatinosus McClelland, 1843

= Indian threadfin =

Species of fish

The Indian threadfin (Leptomelanosoma indicum) is a species of marine ray-finned fish from the family Polynemidae, the threadfins. It is a coastal species from south-east Asia which has been recorded in Papua New Guinea.

== Description ==
The Indian threadfin is a large species with an elongated head and body. Its eye is roughly the same size as the length of its snout. The joint of the jaws is to the rear of the eyelid. It has two separated dorsal fins, the first dorsal fin contains 8 spines while the second dorsal fin has a single spine and 12 or 13 soft rays. The anal fin has 3 spines and 10 or 11 soft rays. The base of the anal-fin is shorter than that of the second dorsal-fin. The pectoral fin has 12 to 14rays and has a length equivalent to 19 to 22% of the standard length, its tip not reaching to the tip of the pelvic fin. The pectoral fin is situated well below the body's midline. There are five pectoral filaments, the first one being the shortest and does not extend to the pelvic fin while the fifth filament is the longest with a length equivalent 28 to 45% of standard length and extending well beyond the posterior tip of the pelvic fin. The caudal fin is deeply forked with the upper and lower lobes being extremely long and filamentous. It has 69 to 72 pored scales in its simple lateral line which extends from the upper end of gill opening to upper end of lower lobe of the caudal-fin lobe. The head and upper flanks are tinted slightly blackish brown, darkening on the lower flanks. The snout and abdomen are blackish. The membranes of first and second dorsal fins and caudal fin are blackish with their outer portions being black. The membrane of the pectoral fin is deep black with the base of the filaments being dusky yellow, darkening to the rear. The pelvic fin is also dusky yellow at its base and dirty white on its other parts. This species can attain a length of 142 centimetres (56 in) but most specimens will be around 50 centimetres (20 in).

== Distribution ==
The Indian threadfin has been confirmed as occurring in the coastal waters of southern Asia from Pakistan to Borneo. In Papua New Guinea there is a single record of a specimen taken in Kerema Bay in the Gulf of Papua. Records from Africa are unconfirmed and not now regarded to be of this species.

== Habitat and ecology ==
The Indian threadfin is found over shallow muddy and sandy substrates on the continental shelf, especially in the vicinity of estuaries and it is known to enter rivers. It is carnivorous and the largest part of its diet is small benthic crustaceans, such as prawns and crabs, and small fishes. The amount of fishes taken increases as the fishes grow larger. It has been taken from as deep as 100 metres (330 ft) but rarely below 55 metres (180 ft). In a sample taken off India 40% of the fish caught were hermaphrodites, 19.3% were males and 41% were females. They spawn in two main periods, April to June and October to November, with the main breeding season being April to June. However, in southern India spawning was in October and November.

== Fisheries ==
The Indian threadfin is one of the most important quarries for fisheries of a number of Asian nations< They are caught with gill nets, trawls, handlines and beach seines. The flesh is used fresh or preserved by freezing, drying and smoking and is prepared by baking, steaming, frying or broiling.

== Species description and taxonomy ==
This species was first formally described by as Polynemus indicum in 1804 by the Irish naturalist George Shaw from a drawing by Russell and he gave the location of the type as Vizagapatam. It was reclassified into the monospecific genus Leptomelanosoma in 2001.
