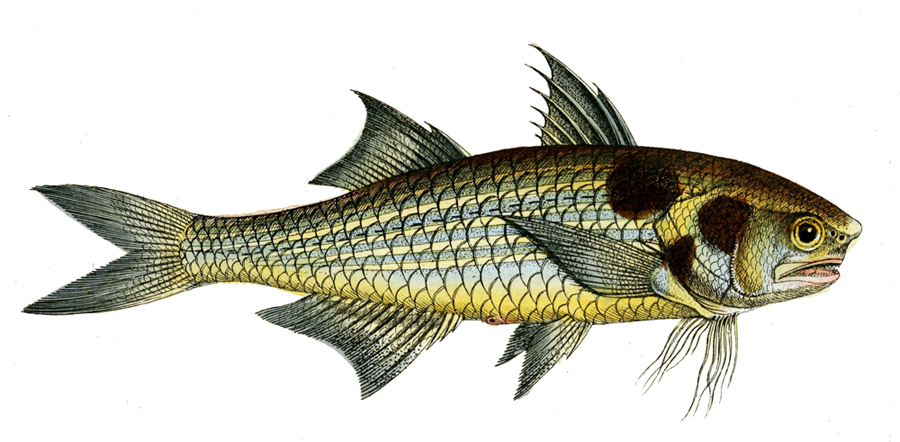

Scientific classification
- Kingdom: Animalia
- Phylum: Chordata
- Class: Actinopterygii
- Order: Carangiformes
- Suborder: Pleuronectoidei
- Family: Polynemidae
- Genus: Polydactylus
- Species: P. sextarius

Binomial name
- Polydactylus sextarius (Bloch & Schneider, 1801)

Synonyms
- Polynemus sextarius Bloch & Schneider, 1801; Trichidion sextarius (Bloch & Schneider, 1801)

= Polydactylus sextarius =

Species of fish

Polydactylus sextarius, the blackspot threadfin, is a species of marine ray-finned fish, a threadfin from the family Polynemidae which is native to the western Pacific and eastern Indian Oceans.

== Description ==
Polydactylus sextarius is a small- to medium-sized threadfin which attains a maximum total length of 30 centimetres (12 in) but 20 centimetres (7.9 in) is more common. It has a pointed snout with the dorsal profile of the head being almost straight. There are two separate dorsal fins, the first with 8 similar spines and the second dorsal fin has a single spine and 12 or 13 soft rays. The anal fin has 3 spines and 11 to 13 soft rays, with the anal fin base being roughly the same length as the base of the second dorsal fin. The pectoral fin contains 13 to 15 rays most if which are solid lacking branches, with the exception of the highest 1 or 2, the tip of the pectoral fin does not extend as far as the tip of the pelvic fin. There are six pectoral filaments with the first being the shortest and the sixth being the longest, at more than a quarter of the standard length but not reaching to the tip of the pectoral fin. The caudal fin is deeply forked, with its long lobes lacking filaments, the length of both lobes reaching a maximum of 41% of standard length. The simple lateral line has 45 to 51 pored scales and extends from the upper end of the gill slit to the upper end of lower caudal fin lobe. The head and upper flanks are dark with a silver tinge paler on the lower flanks. It has a semi transparent snout. Both dorsal fins and the caudal fin are translucent with a sooty rear margin. The anal fin is blackish with a whitish tip. The pectoral fin membrane is white with scattered black spots. The pectoral filaments are whitish. The front of the pelvic fin is yellowish white, paler towards the rear, There is a large black spot on lateral line just behind the upper part of the gill opening.

== Distribution ==
Polydactylus sextarius is found in the Eastern Indian Ocean and Western Pacific. Its range extends from southwestern India to Papua New Guinea, north to Japan. It is rare in the Philippines, eastern Indonesia, and Papua New Guinea.

== Habitat and biology ==
Polydactylus sextarius is found where there are sandy and muddy bottoms on the continental shelf and it appears to favour depths of 16 to 73 metres (52 to 240 ft). This carnivorous species has its diet dominated by shrimps of less than 20 millimetres (0.79 in) length and amphipods but it has also been recorded feeding on crabs, mysids, fishes and polychaetes. Sampling of the population in the Bay of Bengal off India found that a large proportion of the fish are hermaphrodites and that these fell within the range of standard length of 50 to 149 millimetres (2.0 to 5.9 in), with a smaller proportion of females with standard lengths of between 100 and 105 millimetres (3.9 and 4.1 in). The hermaphrodites with comparatively large testes were counted as mature males and these measured 90 to 134 millimetres (3.5 to 5.3 in) standard length) while the fish with granulated ova of 0.3 to 0.5 millimetres (0.012 to 0.020 in) diameter were considered to be mature females and these fell within the standard length range of 105 to 149 millimetres (4.1 to 5.9 in). The species undergoes a protandrous sex change starting as juveniles, becoming hermaphrodites and ending as females progression. They first reach sexual maturity as hermaphrodites which function as males and there is no evidence which suggests that females develop directly from juveniles.

== Fisheries ==
Polydactyus sextarius is an important species for commercial fisheries in the Bay of Bengal and off Thailand where it is caught using trawls.

== Species description ==
Polydactylus sextarius was first formally described as Polynemus sextarius in 1801 by Marcus Elieser Bloch and John Gottlob Schneider with the type locality given as Tranquebar in India.
