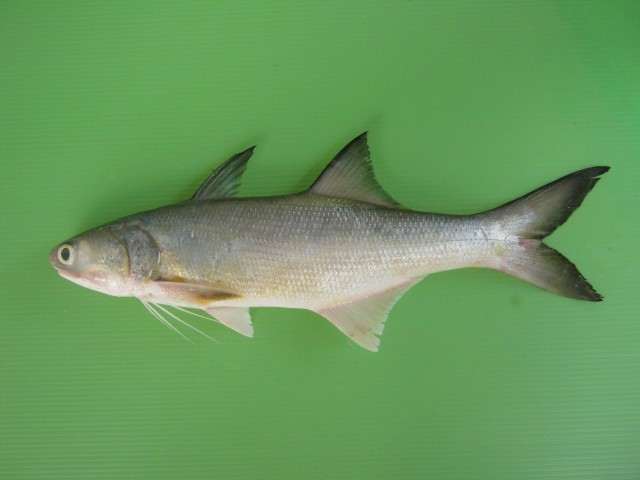
- Eleutheronema tetradactylum

Scientific classification
- Kingdom: Animalia
- Phylum: Chordata
- Class: Actinopterygii
- Order: Carangiformes
- Suborder: Pleuronectoidei
- Family: Polynemidae
- Genus: Eleutheronema; Bleeker, 1862

Type species
- Polynemus tetradactylus Shaw, 1804

= Eleutheronema =

Genus of ray-finned fishes

Eleutheronema is a genus of marine ray-finned fish from the family Polynemidae, the threadfins. These fishes occur in the Indian Ocean and the western Pacific Ocean.

== Species ==
The following species are classified within the genus Eleutheronema:

- Eleutheronema rhadinum (Jordan & Evermann, 1902) (East Asian fourfinger threadfin)
- Eleutheronema tetradactylum (Shaw, 1804) (Fourfinger threadfin)
- Eleutheronema tridactylum (Bleeker, 1849) (Threefinger threadfin)
