= Dwarf paradise fish =

Scientific classification
- Kingdom: Animalia
- Phylum: Chordata
- Class: Actinopterygii
- Order: Carangiformes
- Suborder: Pleuronectoidei
- Family: Polynemidae
- Genus: Parapolynemus; Feltes, 1993
- Species: P. verekeri

Binomial name
- Parapolynemus verekeri (Saville-Kent), 1899

Synonyms
- Polynemus verekeri Saville-Kent, 1899

Species of fish

The dwarf paradise fish (Parapolynemus verekeri), also known as the streamer threadfin or streamered tasselfish, is a species of ray-finned fish from a family Polynemidae, the threadfins. It is the only species in the genus Parapolynemus and it is found in Australia and New Guinea.

== Description ==
The dwarf paradise fish is the smallest species of threadfin which has an elongated body with a large oblique and turned down mouth. It has two separate dorsal fins, the first of which has 8 spines and the second which has a single spine and 11-14 soft rays while the anal fin has 3 spines and 10 -12 soft rays. The base of the anal fin is shorter than that of the second dorsal fin. The caudal fin has long lobes with the lower usually being the longest; normally it is longer than the distance from the snout to the start of the second dorsal fin. The pectoral fins have 12 to 14 simple rays and are located near the midline of the body and may extend beyond the rear end of the anal fin's base. It has 6 or 7 pectoral filaments; with the fifth filament, the farthest back, being the longest, sometimes reaching past the end of the caudal fin. The pelvic fins reach beyond the anus. There are 50 to 60 (mean 56) scales in the lateral line which ends between the centre of the fork of the caudal fin and its first lower ray. This species has its body and head coloured yellow, shading to black on the back, with bright orange fins. The pectoral filaments are deep vermilion in colour. The maximum standard length of 11 centimetres (4.3 in).

== Distribution ==
The dwarf paradise fish is found in the eastern Indian Ocean and the south-western Pacific Ocean in Australia and New Guinea. In New Guinea it is found in the south of the island from Maro River in Western New Guinea to the Gulf of Papua in Papua New Guinea. The Australian distribution extends from Cambridge Gulf in Western Australia to Point Stuart in the Northern Territory.

== Habitat and biology ==
Adult dwarf paradise fish occur in muddy estuaries and the lower part of rivers. There is evidence that the take part in mass spawning as hundreds of adults in near breeding condition were taken at the Medusa Banks by a trawl in January or February 1968.
