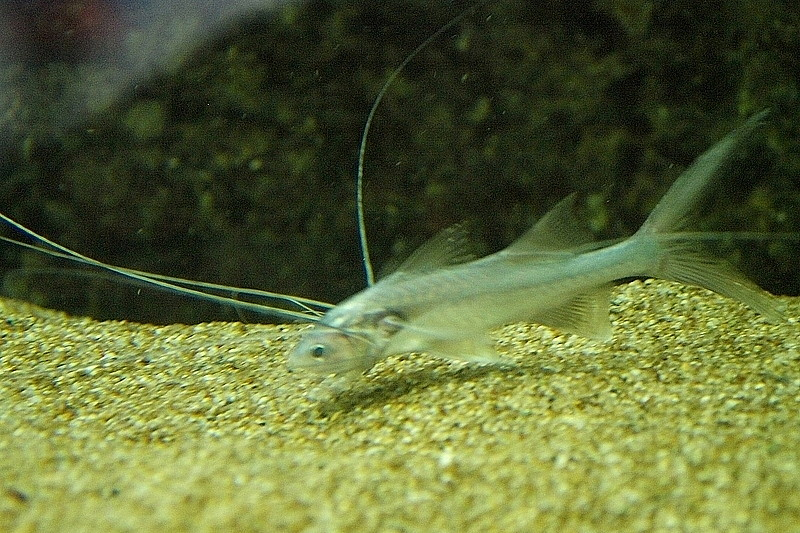
- Polynemus multifilis

Scientific classification
- Kingdom: Animalia
- Phylum: Chordata
- Class: Actinopterygii
- Order: Carangiformes
- Suborder: Pleuronectoidei
- Family: Polynemidae
- Genus: Polynemus; Linnaeus, 1758

Type species
- Polynemus paradiseus Linnaeus, 1758

= Polynemus =

Genus of ray-finned fishes

Polynemus is a genus of threadfins (family Polynemidae). They are native to South and Southeast Asia and, depending on the species, occur in freshwater, brackish, and/or marine environments.

The family Polynemidae is characterized by the pectoral fin that is divided into two sections; the upper one with rays that are attached whereas the lower rays are long and unattached ("threads"). In Polynemus, the unattached rays number 14–15, in contrast to 3–7 in other genera.

== Species ==
There are eight recognized species in this genus:

- Polynemus aquilonaris Motomura, 2003 (Northern paradise fish)
- Polynemus bidentatus Motomura & Tsukawaki, 2006
- Polynemus dubius Bleeker, 1854 (Eastern paradise fish)
- Polynemus hornadayi Myers, 1936 (Hornaday's paradise fish)
- Polynemus kapuasensis Motomura & van Oijen, 2003 (Kapuas elegant paradise fish)
- Polynemus melanochir Valenciennes, 1831 (Blackhand paradise fish)
  - Polynemus melanochir melanochir — Blackhand paradise fish
  - Polynemus melanochir dulcis — Lake blackhand paradise fish
- Polynemus multifilis Temminck & Schlegel, 1843 (Elegant paradise fish)
- Polynemus paradiseus Linnaeus, 1758 (Paradise threadfin)
