= Polynemus aquilonaris =

Conservation status
- Least Concern (IUCN 3.1)

Scientific classification
- Kingdom: Animalia
- Phylum: Chordata
- Class: Actinopterygii
- Order: Carangiformes
- Suborder: Pleuronectoidei
- Family: Polynemidae
- Genus: Polynemus
- Species: P. aquilonaris

Binomial name
- Polynemus aquilonaris Motomura, 2003

Species of fish

Polynemus aquilonaris, commonly known as the northern paradise fish, is a fish of the threadfin family Polynemidae. It is native to the large rivers of mainland Southeast Asia.

== Description ==
Polynemus aquilonaris is a medium-sized species of threadfin which attains a maximum total length of 15.8 centimetres (6.2 in). It has a pointed snout and a dorsal profile which is nearly straight. There are two separate dorsal fins, the first dorsal fin with 8 spines in which the bases of the spines have a similar thickness and the second dorsal fin has a single spine and 15 to 19 soft rays. The anal fin has 3 spines and 11 to 13 soft rays and it has a base that is shorter than the base of the second dorsal-fin base. The pectoral fin has 15 to 17 unbranched rays and has a length equivalent to 34 to 41% of the standard length with its tip falling just short of or reaching slightly beyond the origin of the anal fin. It has 7 pectoral filaments the shortest being the first which does not reach the tip of the pelvic fin and the longest extends well past the tips of the tail. The caudal fin is deeply forked, with long lobes neither of them being filamentous. The lateral line is simple, extends from the upper part of the gill slit to the tail. The head and body are greyish silver on the back and silver below. The front margin of the first dorsal fin and the rear margin of the second dorsal fin are blackish, they are otherwise translucent. The pectoral fins are also translucent. The bases of the pectoral filaments are white, becoming blackish on their tips, The pelvic fin is translucent with its base and its rear edge being white. The white anal fin has a translucent posterior margin with a similar pattern on the tail.

== Distribution ==
Polynemus aquilonaris is found in south-east Asia in the countries of Thailand, Cambodia, Laos and Vietnam where it is found in the drainage basins of the Chao Phraya and Mekong including Tonle Sap and its associated rivers.

== Habitat and biology ==
Polynemus aquilonaris occurs where there are sandy or muddy bottoms in freshwater rivers and estuaries where it feeds on small crustaceans, small fishes, and benthic organisms. This species has not been found to have any hermaphroditic phases and it is thought that it has separate sexes.

== Fisheries ==
Polynemus aquilonaris is esteemed as a food fish within its range. It is exported to Japan as an ornamental species.

== Species description and taxonomy ==
Polynemus aquilonaris was first formally described in 2003 by Hiroyuku Motomura from a specimen purchased at Samyan Fish Market which had been caught in the Chao Phraya. It had previously been considered that the paradise fish in north of Malaya were populations of the Polynemus dubius but Motomura showed that they were a separate species.
