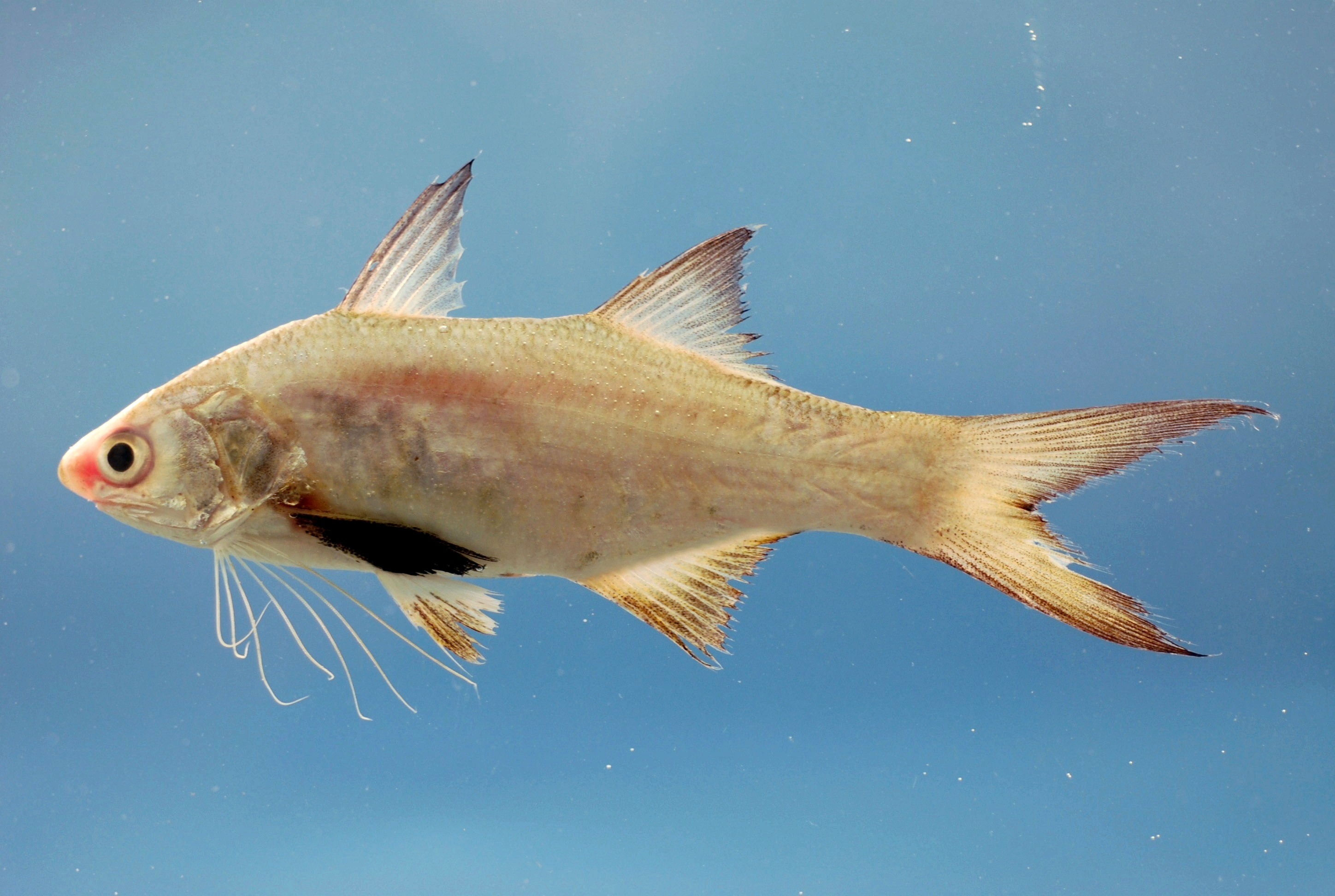

Conservation status
- Least Concern (IUCN 3.1)

Scientific classification
- Kingdom: Animalia
- Phylum: Chordata
- Class: Actinopterygii
- Order: Carangiformes
- Suborder: Pleuronectoidei
- Family: Polynemidae
- Genus: Polydactylus
- Species: P. octonemus

Binomial name
- Polydactylus octonemus (Girard, 1858)

Synonyms
- Polynemus octonemus Girard, 1858; Trichidion octofilis Gill, 1861

= Atlantic threadfin =

Species of fish

The Atlantic threadfin (Polydactylus octonemus) is a species of ray-finned fish, a threadfin from the family Polynemidae native to subtropical and temperate waters of the western Atlantic Ocean and the Gulf of Mexico.

== Description ==
The Atlantic threadfin is a medium-sized species of threadfin which grows to a maximum total length of 30 centimetres (12 in), although most fish have a total length of around 25 centimetres (9.8 in). It has a pointed snout and an almost straight dorsal profile on its head.

There are two separate dorsal fins; the first dorsal fin contains eight spines whose bases are of similar thickness, and the second dorsal fin has a single spine and 11 to 13 soft rays. The anal fin has three spines and 12 to 14 soft rays. The base of the anal fin is longer than that of the second dorsal fin. The pectoral fin has 14 to 16 unbranched rays and has a length equivalent to 24 to 29% of the standard length. Its tip does not reach the tip of the pelvic fins. There are eight pectoral filaments, sometimes nine, and the first pectoral filament is the shortest, extending beyond the level of the front of the pelvic fins while the second to fifth pectoral filaments reach slightly farther and the sixth filament may extend slightly beyond the tip of the pelvic fins. The seventh pectoral filament does not extend as far as the anal-fin origin. The eighth pectoral filament is the longest and it has a length equivalent to 39 to 51% of the standard length. The filaments tend to be longer in adults than they are in young fish. The caudal fin is deeply forked with its upper and lower caudal-fin lobes not bearing filaments. There are 56 to 64 pored scales in the lateral line which is forked on the caudal fin, with branches reaching onto the rear margin of the lobes of the tail.

The upper sides of the head and the flanks are tinged with a slight darkish silver shade, lightening on the lower flanks. It has a semi-translucent snout. The first and second dorsal fins are coloured dusky yellow; the pectoral fin is black while the pectoral filaments are translucent. The dusk-yellow anal fin has a white rear margin. The caudal fin is dusky yellowish with a black rear margin.

== Distribution ==
The Atlantic threadfin is found in the western Atlantic where it occurs from New Smyrna Beach in Florida south and west into the Gulf of Mexico coast of the United States to the Yucatan Peninsula in Mexico. It is absent from the northern part of the Yucatan Peninsula and from Cuba. Vagrants stray as far north as Long Island.

== Habitat and biology ==
The Atlantic threadfin occurs over sandy or muddy bottoms and on beaches, commonly being observed in the surf zone. It occurs at depths between 5 and 66 metres (16 and 217 ft) in the Gulf of Mexico but peak numbers are found at depths of 5 to 16 metres (16 to 52 ft). Young specimens, of lengths less than 66 millimetres (2.6 in) have been taken from the surface of the Gulf of Mexico where the sea was 1,035 to 2,736 metres (3,396 to 8,976 ft). Sexual maturity is reached at total lengths between 165 and 210 millimetres (6.5 and 8.3 in), when they are around 7 to 9 months of age. Spawning probably occurs in the Gulf of Mexico, off Louisiana and Texas and mainly takes place between mid-December and mid-March and lasts between 45 and 120 days overall. The 2–4 month old larvae live in waters shallower than 16 metres (52 ft), dispersing towards deeper waters in the early summer. They typically live no longer than 1 year but may be longer in fish that survive their first pelagic spawning.

== Species description ==
The Atlantic threadfin was originally formally described as Polynemus octonemus in 1858 by Charles Frédéric Girard with the type locality of Brazos Santiago, and Galveston, Texas.
