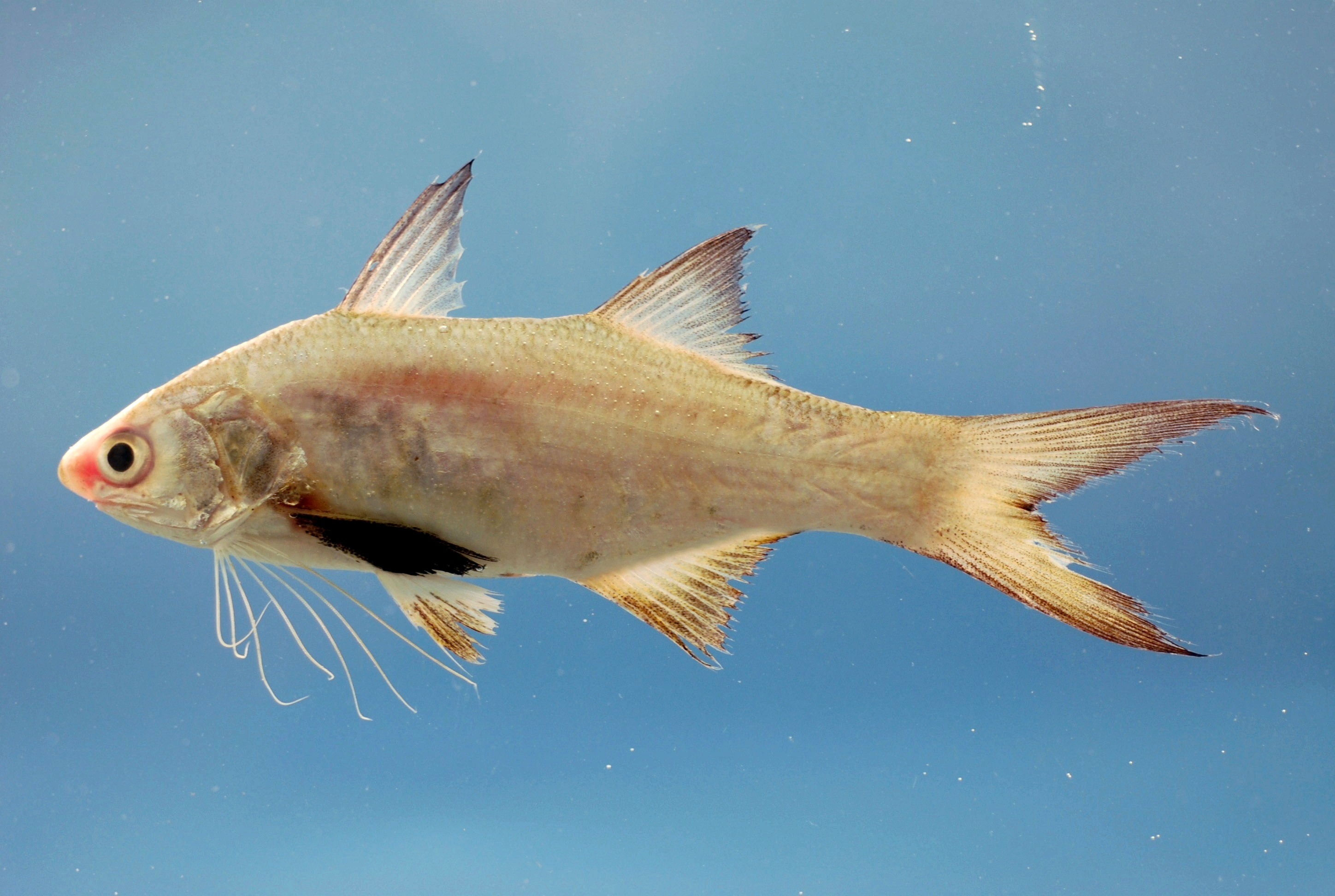
- Atlantic threadfin, Polydactylus octonemus

Scientific classification
- Kingdom: Animalia
- Phylum: Chordata
- Class: Actinopterygii
- Order: Carangiformes
- Suborder: Pleuronectoidei
- Family: Polynemidae; Rafinesque, 1815

Genera
- See text

= Threadfin =

Family of ray-finned fishes

Threadfins are silvery grey ray-finned fish of the family Polynemidae. Found in tropical to subtropical waters throughout the world, the threadfin family contains nine genera and about 40 species. A distantly related species sometimes known by the name threadfin, Scyris indica, is properly the Indian threadfish (family Carangidae).

Ranging in length from 11 cm (4.5 in) in the dwarf threadfin (Parapolynemus verekeri) to 2 m (6.6 ft) in fourfinger threadfin (Eleutheronema tetradactylum) and giant African threadfin (Polydactylus quadrifilis), threadfins are both important to commercial fisheries as a food fish, and popular among anglers. Their habit of forming large schools makes the threadfins a reliable and economic catch.

== Description ==
Their bodies are elongated and fusiform, with spinous and soft dorsal fins widely separated. Their tail fins are large and deeply forked, indicating speed and agility. The mouth is large and inferior; a blunt snout projects far ahead. The jaws and palate possess bands of villiform (fibrous) teeth. Their most distinguishing feature is their pectoral fins: they are composed of two distinct sections, the lower of which consists of three to seven long, thread-like independent rays. Polynemus species may have up to 15 of these modified rays.

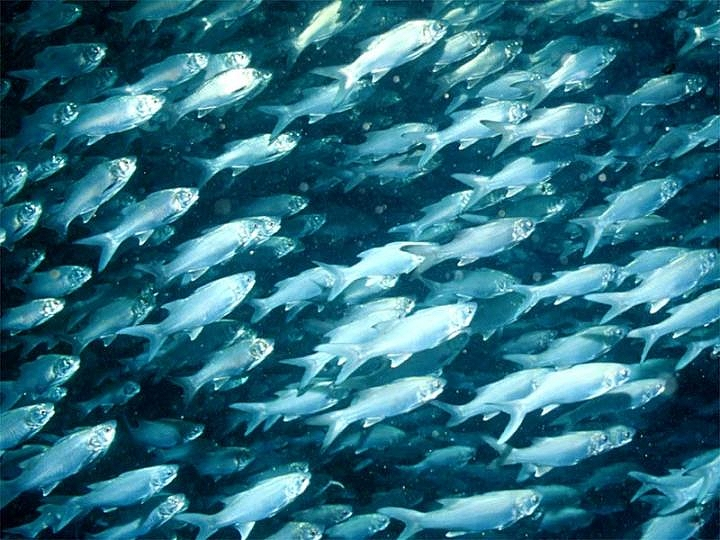
Filistriatus sexfilis or moi (sixfinger threadfins), were reserved for Hawaiian royalty or the aliʻi.

In some species, such as the royal threadfin (Pentanemus quinquarius), the thread-like rays may extend well past the tail fin. This feature explains both the common name threadfin and the family name Polynemidae, from the Greek poly meaning "many" and nema meaning "filament." Similar species, such as the mullets (family Mugilidae) and milkfish (family Chanidae), can be easily distinguished from threadfins by their lack of filamentous pectoral rays.

== Distribution and habitat ==
Threadfins frequent open, shallow water in areas with muddy, sandy, or silty bottoms; they are rarely seen at reefs. Their pectoral rays are thought to serve as tactile structures, helping to find prey within the sediments. Noted for being euryhaline, threadfins can tolerate a wide range of salinity levels. This attribute allows threadfins to enter estuaries and even rivers. They feed primarily on crustaceans and smaller fish.

== Reproduction ==
Presumed to be pelagic spawners, threadfins probably release many tiny, buoyant eggs into the water column, which then become part of the plankton. The eggs float freely with the currents until hatching.

== Cuisine ==
Threadfin has been used to create crab stick.

== Mariculture ==
In Hawaii, sixfinger threadfins are the subject of commercial open-ocean cage mariculture.

== Genera and species ==
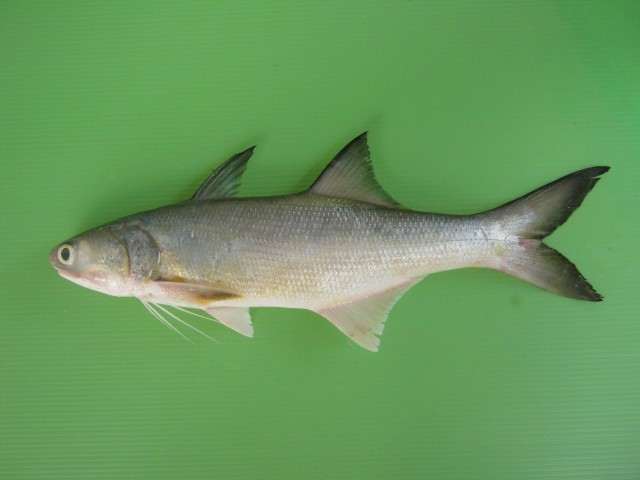
Fourfinger threadfin (Eleutheronema tetradactylum)

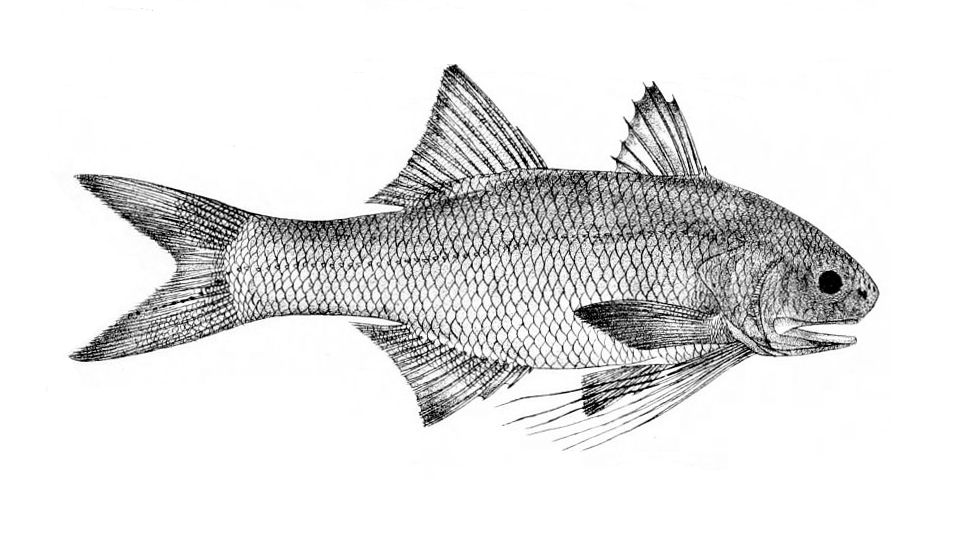
Sevenfinger threadfin (Filimanus heptadactyla)

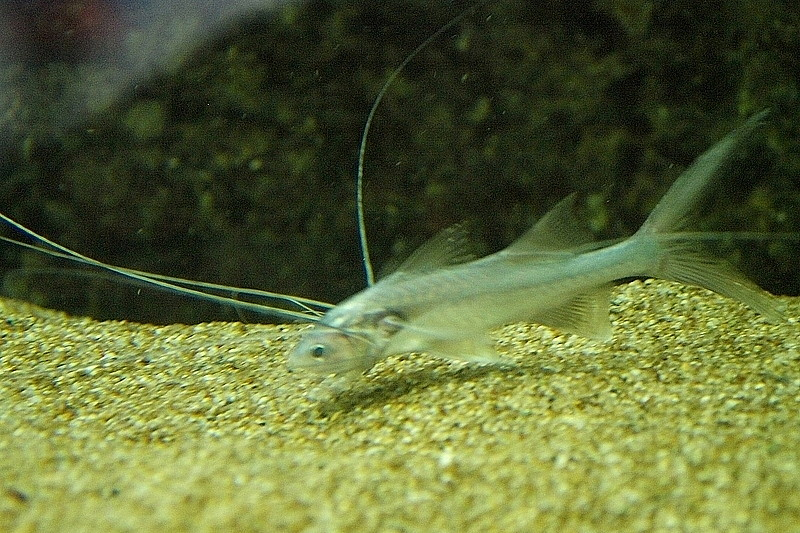
Elegant paradise fish (Polynemus multifilis)

The family includes 43 species in nine genera:

- Genus Eleutheronema
  - Eleutheronema rhadinum (Jordan & Evermann, 1902) (East Asian fourfinger threadfin)
  - Eleutheronema tetradactylum (Shaw, 1804) (Fourfinger threadfin)
  - Eleutheronema tridactylum (Bleeker, 1849) (Threefinger threadfin)
- Genus Filimanus
  - Filimanus heptadactyla (Cuvier, 1829) (Sevenfinger threadfin)
  - Filimanus hexanema (Cuvier 1829) (Javanese threadfin)
  - Filimanus perplexa Feltes 1991 (Splendid threadfin)
  - Filimanus sealei (Jordan & Richardson, 1910) (Eightfinger threadfin)
  - Filimanus similis Feltes 1991 (Indian sevenfinger threadfin)
  - Filimanus xanthonema (Valenciennes, 1831) (Yellowthread threadfin)
- Genus Filistriatus
  - Filistriatus bifurcus (Motomura, Kimura & Iwatsuki, 2001) (Slender fivefinger threadfin)
  - Filistriatus plebeius (Broussonet, 1782) (Striped threadfin)
  - Filistriatus sexfilis (Valenciennes, 1831) (Sixfinger threadfin)
  - Filistriatus siamensis (Motomura, Iwatsuki & Yoshino, 2001) (Largemouth striped threadfin)
- Genus Galeoides
  - Galeoides decadactylus (Bloch, 1795) (Lesser African threadfin)
- Genus Leptomelanosoma
  - Leptomelanosoma indicum (Shaw, 1804) (Indian threadfin)
  - Leptomelanosoma longipes (Motomura, Okamoto & Iwatsuki, 2001) (Long-limb threadfin)
- Genus Parapolynemus
  - Parapolynemus verekeri (Saville-Kent, 1889) (Dwarf paradise fish)
- Genus Pentanemus
  - Pentanemus quinquarius (Linnaeus, 1758) (Royal threadfin)
- Genus Polydactylus (likely not monophyletic)
  - Polydactylus approximans (Lay & Bennett, 1839) (Blue bobo)
  - Polydactylus luparensis Lim, Motomura & Gambang, 2010 (Sarawak giant threadfin)
  - Polydactylus macrochir (Günther, 1867) (King threadfin)
  - Polydactylus macrophthalmus (Bleeker, 1858) (River threadfin)
  - Polydactylus malagasyensis Motomura & Iwatsuki, 2001 (African blackspot threadfin)
  - Polydactylus microstomus (Bleeker, 1851) (Smallmouth threadfin)
  - Polydactylus mullani (Hora, 1926) (Arabian blackspot threadfin)
  - Polydactylus multiradiatus (Günther, 1860) (Australian threadfin)
  - Polydactylus nigripinnis Munro, 1964 (Blackfin threadfin)
  - Polydactylus octonemus (Girard, 1858) (Atlantic threadfin)
  - Polydactylus oligodon (Günther, 1860) (Littlescale threadfin)
  - Polydactylus opercularis Seale & Bean, 1907 (Yellow bobo)
  - Polydactylus persicus Motomura & Iwatsuki, 2001 (Persian blackspot threadfin)
  - Polydactylus quadrifilis (Cuvier, 1829) (Giant African threadfin)
  - Polydactylus sextarius (Bloch & Schneider, 1801) (Blackspot threadfin)
  - Polydactylus virginicus (Linnaeus, 1758) (Barbu)
- Genus Polynemus
  - Polynemus aquilonaris Motomura, 2003 (Northern paradise fish)
  - Polynemus bidentatus Motomura & Tsukawaki, 2006
  - Polynemus dubius Bleeker, 1854 (Eastern paradise fish)
  - Polynemus hornadayi Myers, 1936 (Hornaday's paradise fish)
  - Polynemus kapuasensis Motomura & van Oijen, 2003 (Kapuas elegant paradise fish)
  - Polynemus melanochir Valenciennes, 1831 (Blackhand paradise fish)
  - Polynemus multifilis Temminck & Schlegel, 1843 (Elegant paradise fish)
  - Polynemus paradiseus Linnaeus, 1758 (Paradise threadfin)

== Phylogeny ==
The following cladogram is from Girard & Chovanec (2025):

- Polynemidae
  - "Polydactylus" quadrifilis
  - - Pentanemus quinquarius
    - - Galeoides decadactylus
      - - - - Polydactylus opercularis
            - - Polydactylus approximans
              - - Polydactylus virginicus
                - - Polydactylus octonemus
                  - Polydactylus oligodon
          - - - - Parapolynemus verekeri
                - "Polydactylus" macrochir
              - - "Polydactylus" multiradiatus
                - "Polydactylus" nigripinnis
            - - - Eleutheronema rhadinum
                - Eleutheronema tetradactylum
              - - Filistriatus bifurcus
                - - Filistriatus plebeius
                  - Filistriatus sexfilis
        - - - Polynemus multifilis
            - - Polynemus aquilonaris
              - - Polynemus melanochir
                - Polynemus paradiseus
          - - - Leptomelanosoma indicum
              - Leptomelanosoma macrophthalmus
            - - - Filimanus perplexa
                - - Filimanus similis
                  - - Filimanus sealei
                    - Filimanus xanthonema
              - - "Polydactylus" longipes
                - - "Polydactylus" mullani
                  - - "Polydactylus" microstomus
                    - - "Polydactylus" malagasyensis
                      - "Polydactylus" sextarius
