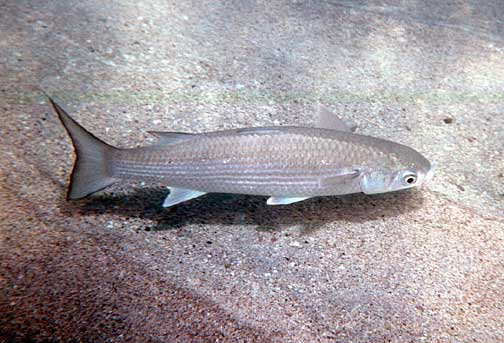

Scientific classification
- Kingdom: Animalia
- Phylum: Chordata
- Class: Actinopterygii
- Order: Carangiformes
- Suborder: Pleuronectoidei
- Family: Polynemidae
- Genus: Filistriatus
- Species: F. sexfilis

Binomial name
- Filistriatus sexfilis (Valenciennes, 1831)

Synonyms
- Polynemus sexfilis Valenciennes, 1831; Polydactylus sexfilis (Valenciennes, 1831); Polynemus kuru Bleeker, 1853; Polydactylus kuru (Bleeker, 1853)

= Filistriatus sexfilis =

Species of ray-finned fish

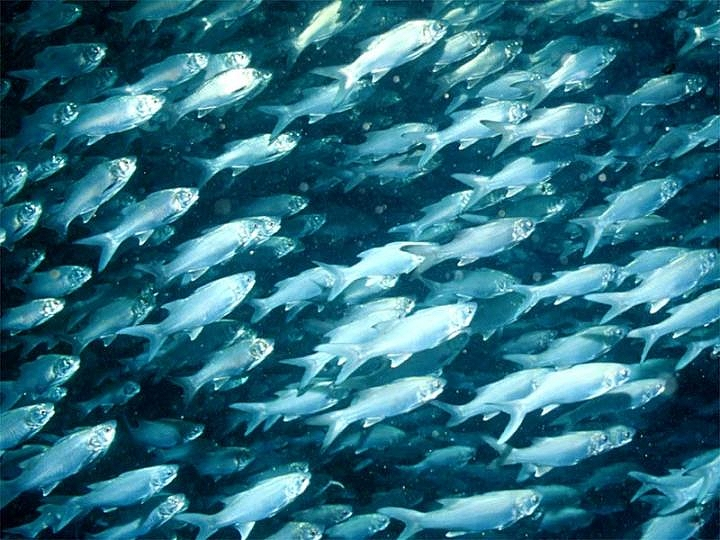
a school of Filistriatus sexfilis

Filistriatus sexfilis, the six-finger threadfin or yellowthread threadfin, is a species of marine ray-finned fish, a threadfin from the family Polynemidae which is found in the Indian and Pacific Oceans.

== Description ==
Filistriatus sexfilis is a medium-sized species, which attains a maximum total length of 61 centimetres (24 in) and a weight of 3.2 kilograms (7.1 lb). It has a pointed snout and the head has an almost horizontal profile. There are two separated dorsal fins, the first dorsal fin has 8 spines and the second dorsal fin contains a single spine and 12 or 13 soft rays. The anal fin has 3 spines and 11 or 12 soft rays, the base of the anal fin is roughly equal in length to the second dorsal-fin base. The pectoral fin has 15 or 16 rays, and this fin has a length which is equal to 20 to 23% of the standard length, and its tip does not reach the tip of pelvic fin; almost all the rays of the pectoral fin are unbranched except that in the largest specimens some of the rays may be branched. There are six pectoral filaments, the first is the shortest and does not reach the pelvic fin origin. The second to fifth filaments reach past the pelvic-fin origin and the sixth is the longest and reached to or just beyond the tip of the pelvic fin. The caudal fin is deeply forked and its lobes are non-filamentous, although they are long. The simple lateral line has 60 to 67 pored scales and runs from the upper end of the gill slit to the upper end of the lower lobe of the caudal fin. The head and flanks are tinged silvery brown dorsally, becoming silvery on their lower flanks. There are 7 to 9 prominent dark longitudinal stripes above the lateral line and 1 to 12 faint stripes below it, these may be absent in smaller fish. The first dorsal fin is black; the second dorsal fin is greyish with the last ray being white. The base of the pectoral fin is greyish black, darkening to black towards the rear. The pectoral filaments are greyish-black with white tips and bases. The front part of the pelvic fin is greyish black with the rest of it being coloured white. The anal fin is greyish-black with its last ray being white. The tail is uniformly greyish black.

== Distribution ==
Filistriatus sexfilis has an Indo-Pacific distribution. It tends to occur mainly around oceanic islands. It has been recorded from Mauritius, Seychelles, Kenya and a number of other islands in the northern Indian Ocean. It is also found from Indonesia north to the island groups of southern Japan and east to the Hawaiian Islands, French Polynesia and Pitcairn Island. It has not been collected from continental Australia but has occurred from Cocos (Keeling) Island.

== Habitat and biology ==
Filistriatus sexfilis is found in shallow water which are less than 50 metres (160 ft) along sandy and rocky coastal beaches, in lagoons and near reef areas near oceanic islands, often where the water is very turbulent. It feeds largely on crustaceans and fishes. They reach sexual maturity as males when they attain a fork length of 20–25 centimetres (7.9–9.8 in) and then changing sex to fertile females after an intermediate hermaphrodite stage when they reach a fork length of 30–40 centimetres (12–16 in). Spawning is governed by the phases of the moon.

== Fisheries ==
Filistriatus sexfilis is an important species for commercial fisheries in Hawaii where it is also used in aquaculture. In Hawaiian this species is called moi and in pre colonial Hawaii the moi was reserved for royalty. They were farmed in specially created ponds.

== Species description ==
Filistriatus sexfilis was first formally described in 1831 by Achille Valenciennes as Polynemus sexfilis with the type locality given as Mauritius.
