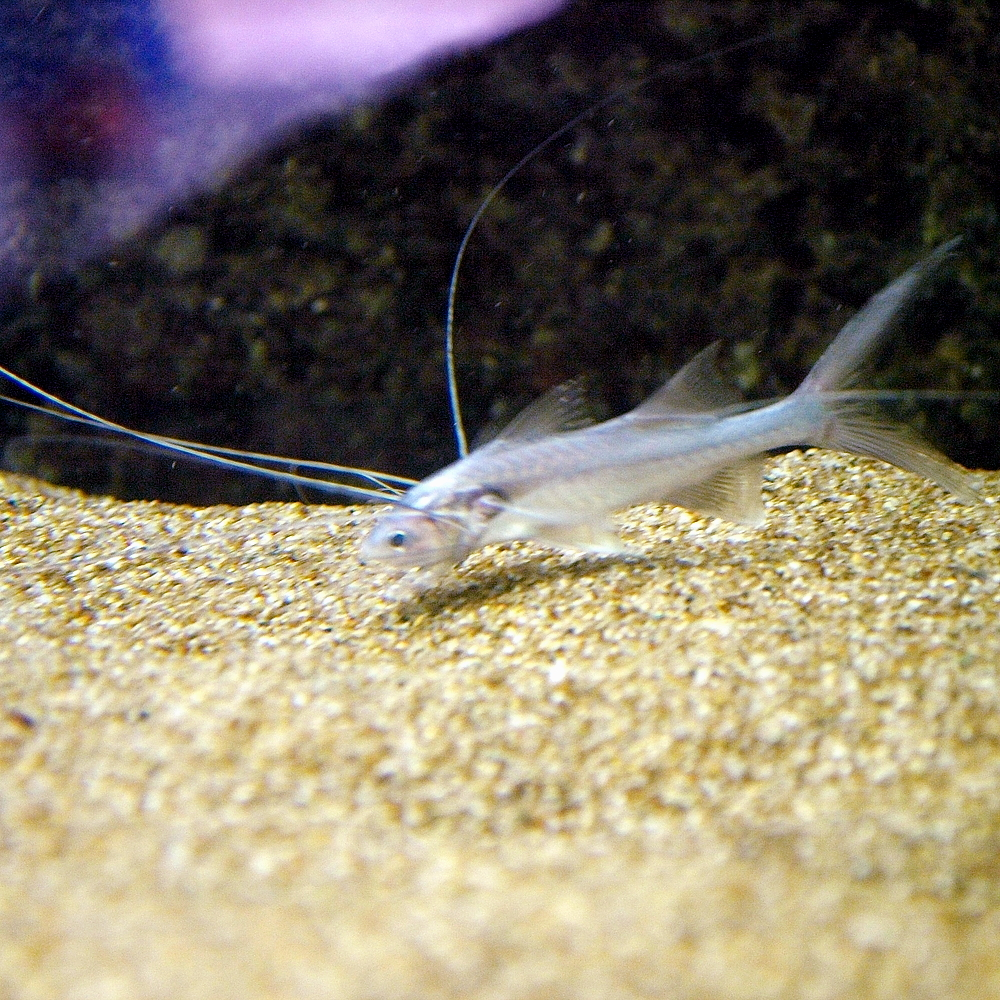

Conservation status
- Data Deficient (IUCN 3.1)

Scientific classification
- Kingdom: Animalia
- Phylum: Chordata
- Class: Actinopterygii
- Order: Carangiformes
- Suborder: Pleuronectoidei
- Family: Polynemidae
- Genus: Polynemus
- Species: P. multifilis

Binomial name
- Polynemus multifilis Temminck & Schlegel, 1843

Synonyms
- Polistonemus multifilis (Temminck & Schlegel, 1843); Polynemus quatordecimfilis Pel, 1851; Polynemus polydactylus Bleeker, 1852

= Polynemus multifilis =

Species of fish

Polynemus multifilis, the elegant paradise fish, is a species of ray-finned fish, a threadfin from the family Polynemidae which is found in rivers in southeast Asia.

== Description ==
Polynemus multifilis is a medium-sized species of threadfin which attains a maximum standard length of 28 centimetres (11 in). It has a pointed snout and the dorsal profile of the head is almost straight, There are two separate dorsal fins, the first dorsal fin contains 8 spines which are all of a similar thickness at their bases and the second dorsal fin has a single spine and 14-16 soft rats. The anal fin contains 3 spines and 11 to 13 soft rays and its base is shorter than that of the second dorsal fin. The pectoral fin has 14-16 unbranched soft rays and its tip reaches the origin of the anal fin. There are normally fourteen, rarely thirteen or fifteen, pectoral filaments on each side of the body and the count on each side is not necessarily symmetrical. The longest of these are longer than the total length of the fish. The lateral line contains 83-99 pored scales and is simple, it starts at the upper margin of the gill slit and extends to the middle of the caudal fin. The caudal fin is deeply forked but neither lobe bears any filaments. The upper head and upper body are dark purplish-blue and below this the fish is silver in colour. The bases of the dorsal, anal and caudal fins are greyish white while the forward margin of the pelvic fin white. The remaining parts of these fins are semi-transparent as is the pectoral fin.The pectoral filaments are white.

== Distribution ==
Polynemus multifilis has been recorded from the Chao Phraya River system in Thailand, the Musi and Batanghari rivers in southeastern Sumatra, Indonesia, and on Borneo in the Sampit and Barito rivers in southern Kalimantan, Indonesia. This species is absent from the Kapuas River where the endemic Polynemus kapuasensis appears to replace it.

== Habitat and biology ==
Polynemus multifilis is found in freshwater rivers where there is a sandy or muddy substrate. It is a carnivorous species which preys on crustaceans, small fishes and benthic invertebrates.

== Fisheries ==
Polynemus multifilis is highly regarded as a food fish, especially in Thailand. It is also caught for export to Japan as an ornamental fish.

== Species description ==
Polynemus multifilis was first formally described in 1843 by Coenraad Jacob Temminck and Hermann Schlegel with the type locality being given as near Banjarmasin on Borneo.
