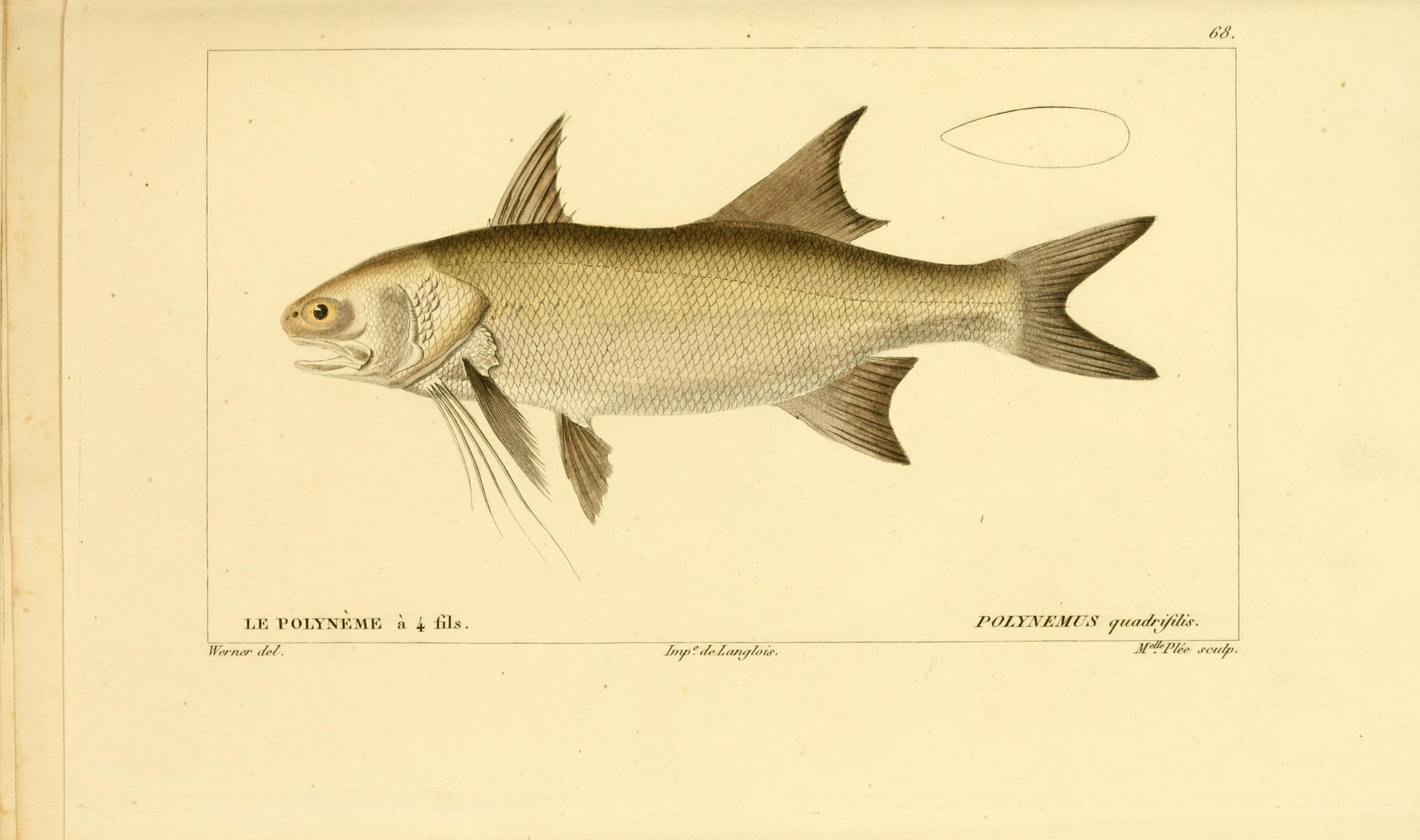
- Illustration

Conservation status
- Least Concern (IUCN 3.1)

Scientific classification
- Kingdom: Animalia
- Phylum: Chordata
- Class: Actinopterygii
- Order: Carangiformes
- Suborder: Pleuronectoidei
- Family: Polynemidae
- Genus: Polydactylus
- Species: P. quadrifilis

Binomial name
- Polydactylus quadrifilis (Cuvier, 1829)

Synonyms
- Trichidion quadrifilis (Cuvier, 1829); Polynemus quadrifilis (Cuvier, 1829)

= Giant African threadfin =

Species of ray-finned fish

The giant African threadfin (Polydactylus quadrifilis) is a species of ray-finned fish from the threadfin family Polynemidae. It is found in the eastern Atlantic Ocean off the west coast of Africa.

== Description ==
The giant African threadfin is, as its common name indicates, a large species of threadfin attaining a maximum total length of 200 centimetres (79 in), although the more common size is 150 centimetres (59 in). It has a pointed snout and an almost straight dorsal profile on the head. It has two separate dorsal fins; the first has eight spines with the second spine thicker than the rest, and the second dorsal fin contains a single spine and thirteen soft rays. The anal fin has three spines and eleven soft rays, its base approximately equal in length to the base of the second dorsal fin. The pectoral fin has twelve or thirteen unbranched rays, and measures 20 to 24% of the standard length of the fish, its tip not extending as far as the tip of the pelvic fin. There are four pectoral filaments with the first being the shortest; the first three filaments extend past the origin of the pelvic fin but not as far as its tip. The fourth pectoral filament is the longest, being 27 to 39% of the standard length and reaching at least to the tip of the pelvic fin. The caudal fin is deeply forked and has non-filamentous long lobes. There are 70*71 pored scales in the lateral line which is simple and runs from the upper end of the gill slit to the upper end of the lower lobe of the caudal fin. The head and upper flanks are silver with a blackish tint, paler on the lower flanks and white on the breast and belly. The snout is semi-transparent. The dorsal fins and caudal fin are pale with blackish rear margins. The pectoral fin is bright yellow and the pectoral filaments are white. The pelvic and anal fins are dusky with white on the front edge and at their bases.

== Distribution ==
The giant African threadfin occurs in the tropical eastern Atlantic Ocean off the coast of western Africa from Senegal to Congo. There is a single record from Mauritania.

== Habitat and biology ==
The giant African threadfin is found in shallow coastal waters where there are sandy and muddy bottoms and is occasionally recorded in brackish waters. It will enter estuaries, and is rarely taken in fresh water, but the largest individuals are only recorded from marine waters. This carnivorous fish eats crustaceans and fishes.

== Fisheries ==
The giant African threadfin is a highly sought after species for commercial and sport fisheries.

== Species description ==
The giant African threadfin was first formally described by Georges Cuvier in Histoire naturelle des poissons. Tome troisième. Suite du Livre troisième. Des percoïdes à dorsale unique à sept rayons branchiaux et à dents en velours ou en cardes co-authored with Achille Valenciennes. The name Cuvier gave it was Polynemus quadrifilis and the type locality was given as Senegal.
