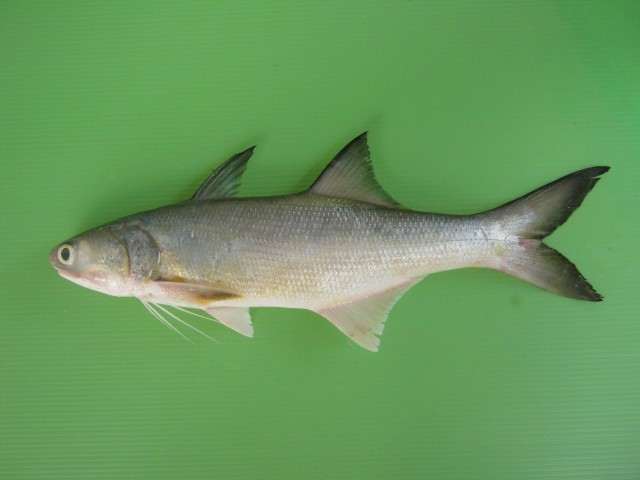

Conservation status
- Endangered (IUCN 3.1) (Persian Gulf)

Scientific classification
- Kingdom: Animalia
- Phylum: Chordata
- Class: Actinopterygii
- Order: Carangiformes
- Suborder: Pleuronectoidei
- Family: Polynemidae
- Genus: Eleutheronema
- Species: E. tetradactylum

Binomial name
- Eleutheronema tetradactylum (Shaw, 1804)

Synonyms
- Polynemus tetradactylus Shaw, 1804; Polynemus teria Hamilton, 1822; Polynemus coecus Macleay, 1878

= Eleutheronema tetradactylum =

Species of ray-finned fish

Eleutheronema tetradactylum, the fourfinger threadfin, known as rawas in India is a species of marine ray-finned fish, a threadfin from the family Polynemidae which occurs in the Indian and western Pacific Ocean.

== Description ==
Eleutheronema tetradactylum has two dorsal fins; the first has 9 spines and the second has 13–15 soft rays, with 13 being the mean. The anal fin has 3 spines and 14–19 soft rays. The pectoral fins have 16–18 rays, and there are 4 pectoral filaments. The upper sides of the head and body have a slight darkish silver tinge, lighting in the lower flanks. Both dorsal fins show a blackish anterior margin, with the remaining parts of the fins translucent and slightly dusky. The membranes of the pectoral fins are vivid yellow in smaller individuals, but in larger fish this becomes duskier. The pectoral filaments are white. The pelvic fins are white with a yellow front edge, while the caudal fin is blackish with a yellowish base. This species can attain a maximum total length of 2 metres (6.6 ft), although 50 centimetres (20 in) is a more normal size.

== Distribution ==
Eleutheronema tetradactylum has an Indo-Pacific distribution and ranges from the Persian Gulf to Australia and Papua New Guinea.

== Habitat and biology ==
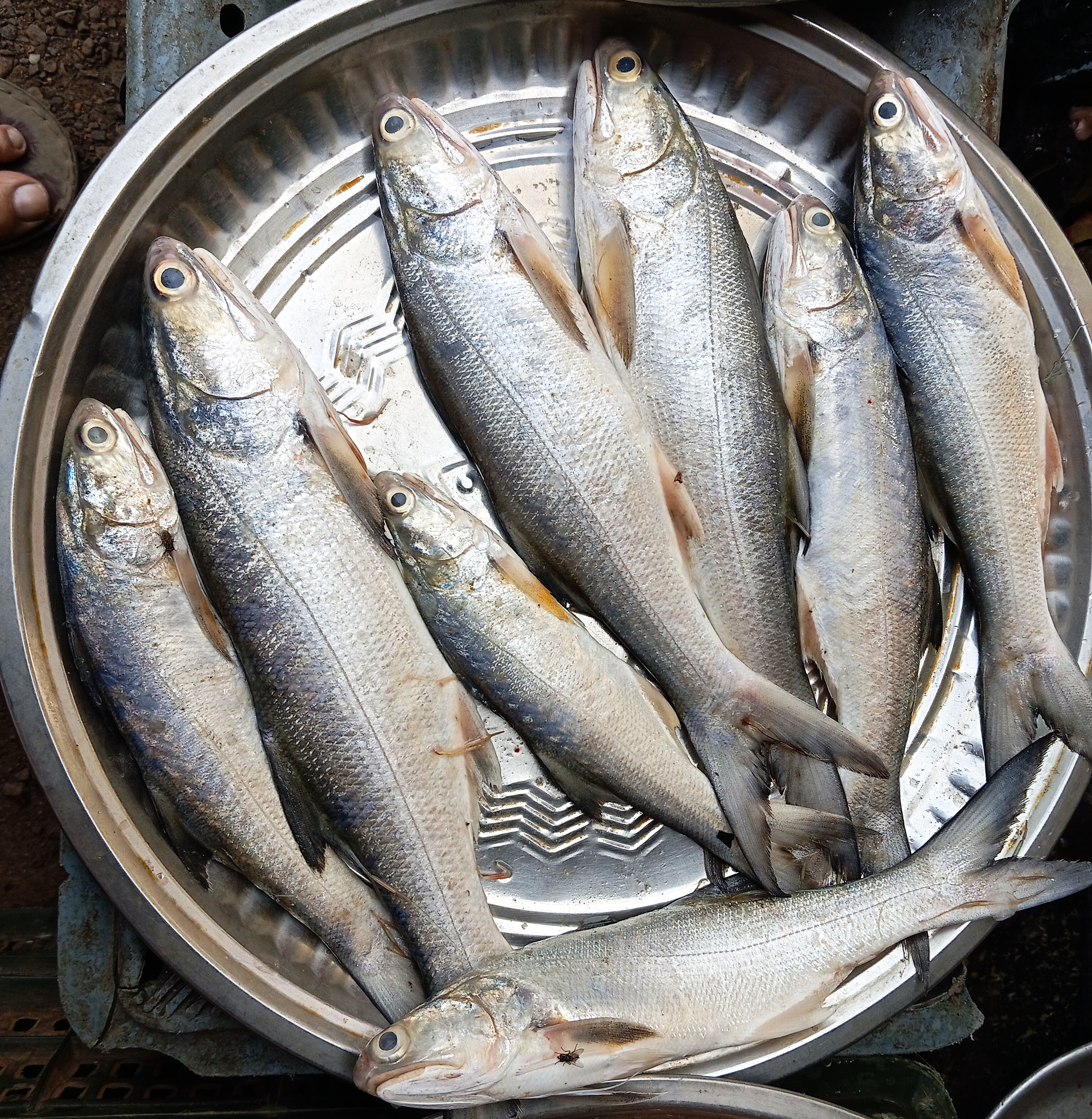
Indian Salmon (Eleutheronema tetradactylum), Kolkata, West Bengal, India

Eleutheronema tetradactylum adults show a preference for shallow muddy substrates in coastal waters and they may enter rivers. The juveniles occur in estuaries. In the winter the adults move up rivers. It is normally observed in loose schools, but larger fish are more often recorded as pairs or individuals. It is a carnivorous species which preys on prawns and fish. The fish preyed upon are mainly grey mullets, anchovies and drums, and they sometimes feed on polychaetes. The ratio of crustaceans to fish fed on varies with the season. The small larvae have a diet dominated by copepods and mysids although they also feed on small decapods while larger juveniles feed prawns and mysids. This species is a protandrous hermaphrodite and Australian studies found that they were males at fork length of 24–47 centimetres (9.4–18.5 in), hermaphrodites at fork lengths between 25–46 centimetres (9.8–18.1 in) FL and females are found at fork lengths of 28–72 centimetres (11–28 in). Off the northeast coast of Queensland, most of the fish with fork lengths greater than 45–50 centimetres (18–20 in) are females. The hermaphroditic fish form once they reach 1- to 2-year-old, and then females begin to appear at 2-3-years old. It is thought that the males change to hermaphrodites just after spawning in April and May and they remain in a hermaphroditic state until the next breeding season is over. They then progress from hermaphrodites to females before the breeding season after that. The larval stage is little known but it is known that lower estuaries, tidal swamps and lagoons, and the shallows along the foreshores are used as nursery areas.

== Usage ==
Eleutheronema tetradactylum is marketed fresh, frozen, and dried or salted. This species is also used in aquaculture. This species is one of an important commercial quarry for fisheries in Kuwait and the species is also taken as bycatch. They are one of the more expensive fish in the Kuwaiti and Iranian markets.

== Conservation ==
Eleutheronema tetradactylum has not had its global conservation status evaluated by the IUCN but it has been classified as Endangered in the Persian Gulf where the population appears to be in a rapid decline.

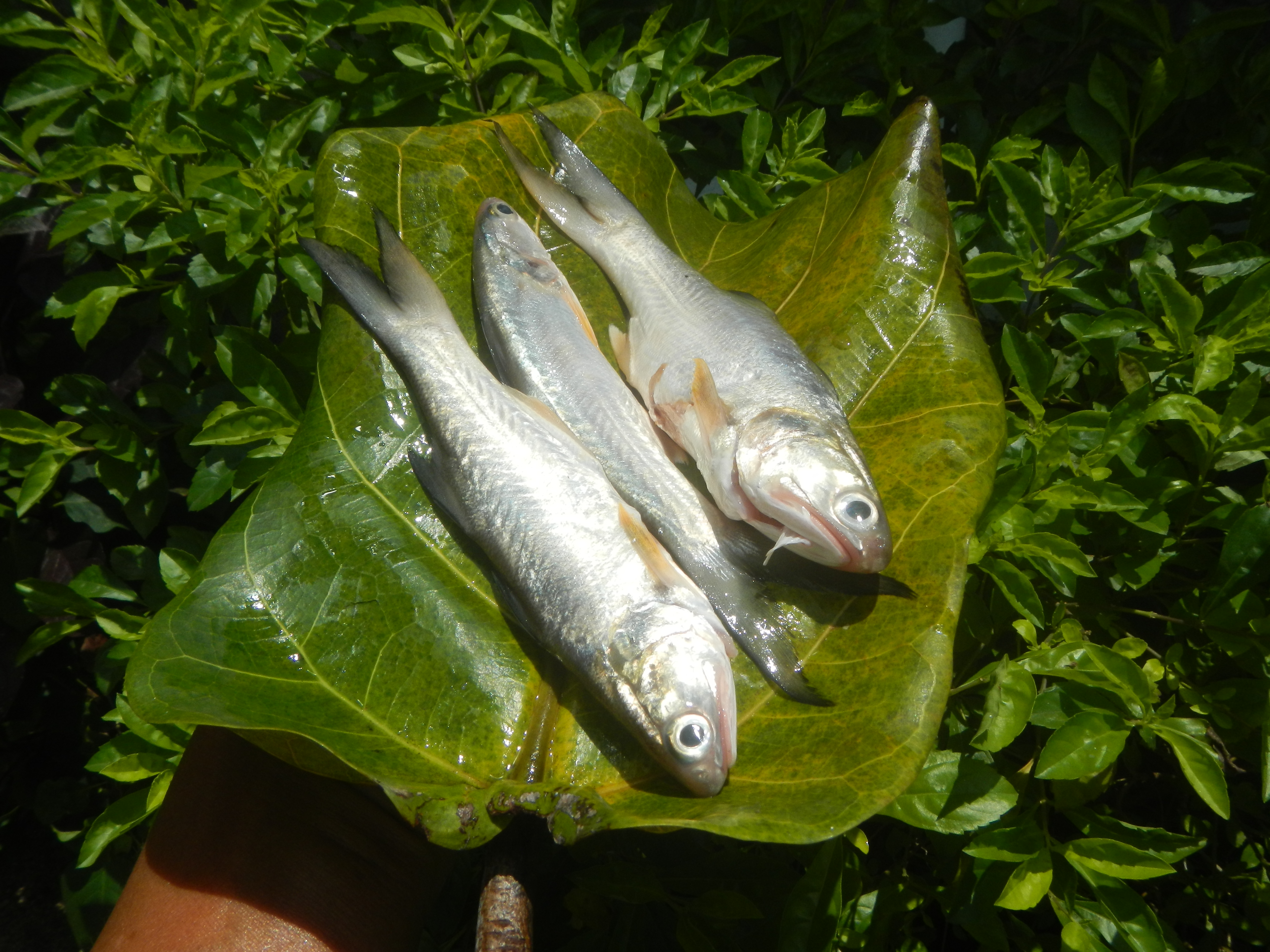
Juvenile "Bikaw" Philippines

== Common names ==
Eleutheronema tetradactylum is a widespread and commercially important species and, as such, has a number of English common names, other than the fourfinger threadfin. In Australia it is known as the blue threadfin, although other names include blind tassel-fish, blue salmon, bluenose salmon, blunt-nosed salmon, burnett salmon, Colonial salmon, Cooktown salmon, giant threadfin, kingfish, Rockhampton kingfish, Rockhampton salmon, tassel-fish and threadfin. In India names used include Gurjali fish in Bengali, Indian salmon, white salmon, row ball and horse's friend.
