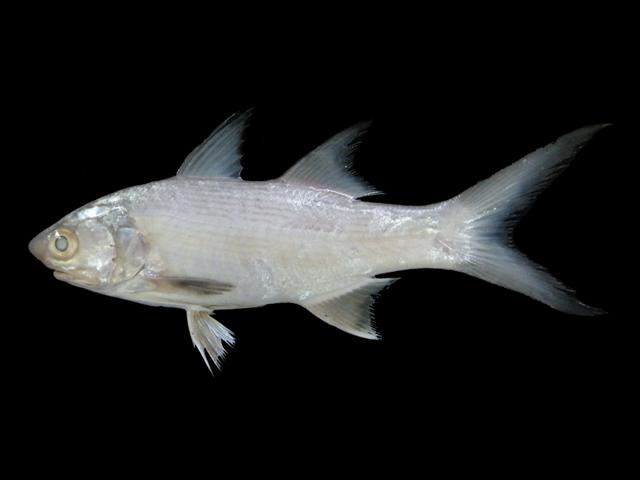

Scientific classification
- Kingdom: Animalia
- Phylum: Chordata
- Class: Actinopterygii
- Division: Teleostei
- Order: Carangiformes
- Suborder: Pleuronectoidei
- Family: Polynemidae
- Genus: Filistriatus
- Species: F. plebeius

Binomial name
- Filistriatus plebeius (Broussonet, 1782)

Synonyms
- Polynemus plebeius Broussonet, 1782; Polydactylus plebeius (Broussonet, 1782); Trichidion plebejum (Broussonet, 1782); Polynemus lineatus Lacépède, 1803; Polynemus emoi Lacepède, 1803; Polynemus niloticus Shaw, 1804; Polynemus commersonii Shaw, 1804; Polynemus taeniatus Günther, 1860; Polynemus lineatus Günther, 1860; Polydactylus agonasi Jordan & McGregor, 1906; Polynemus agonasi (Jordan & McGregor, 1906); Polynemus lydiae Curtiss, 1938

= Filistriatus plebeius =

Species of ray-finned fish

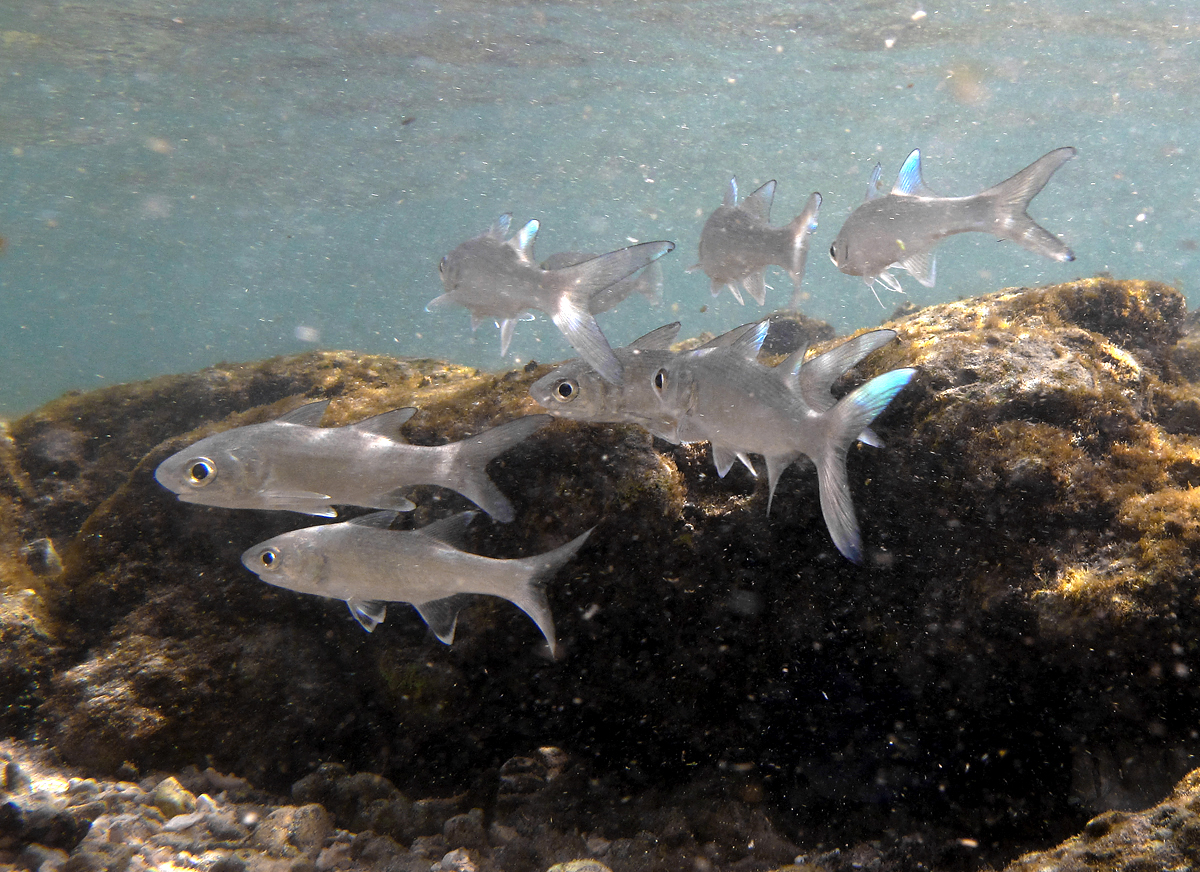
Juveniles, Reunion

Filistriatus plebeius, the striped threadfin, also known as the common threadfin, Northern threadfin or puttynose, is a species of marine fish native to the Indo-Pacific.

== Description ==
Filistriatus plebeius is a medium-sized threadfin which attains a maximum total length of 45 centimetres (18 in) but is more commonly 30 centimetres (12 in). It has a pointed snout and the dorsal profile of the head is nearly straight. There are two separate dorsal fins, the first containing 8 spines which all have a base of similar thickness and the second dorsal fin has a single spine and 12 or 13 soft rays. The anal fin has 3 spines and 11 or 12 soft rays and has a base which is roughly equal in length to that of the second dorsal fin. The pectoral fin has 16 to 18 unbranched rays and has a mean length of one fifth of the standard length and its tip does not extend to the tip of the pelvic fin. This species has 5 pectoral filaments, the first is the shortest and it extends to a point just short of or equal to the origin of the pelvic fin. The second to fourth pectoral filaments do not extends as far as the tip of pelvic fin. The fifth pectoral filament is the longest, having a mean length equivalent to one-third of the standard length and it extends beyond the tip of pelvic fin. The caudal fin is deeply forked with both long caudal fin lobes lacking filaments. There are 60-68 pored scales in the lateral line which is simple and extends from the upper end of gill slit to upper end of the lower lobe of the caudal-fin. The head and upper flanks of the body are silver with a slight blackish tinge. The colour lightens on the lower flanks and the underside is white. The snout is semi-transparent. The first and second dorsal fins, as well as the caudal fin, are pale with blackish rear margins. The membrane of the pectoral fin is blackish. The pectoral filaments are white. The forward margins and origins of the pelvic and anal fins are white, while their other parts are a dusky yellowish white. This species also has 7 or 8 prominent horizontal dark stripes above the lateral line with 7 to 9 faint stripes below it.

== Distribution ==
Filistriatus plebeius is found in the Indo-Pacific from the coast of East Africa where it occurs as far south as South Africa through the Indian Ocean and into the Pacific Ocean as far east as French Polynesia, extending south to northern New South Wales and north to Japan. It is absent from the Red Sea and the Persian Gulf.

== Habitat and biology ==
Filistriatus plebeius occurs over muddy substrates on the continental shelf, in estuaries and off coastal beaches down to depths no greater than 122 metres (400 ft). It gathers in loose schools. It feeds on small crustaceans, fishes and other benthic organisms.

== Fisheries ==
Filistriatus plebeius is an important species for fisheries in South Asia, Southeast Asia, and particularly in Melanesia and Polynesia. It is fished using trawls, gill nets, handlines and beach seines.

== Species description ==
Filistriatus plebeius was first formally described as Polynemus plebeius by Pierre Marie Auguste Broussonet in 1782 with the type locality given as Tahiti.
