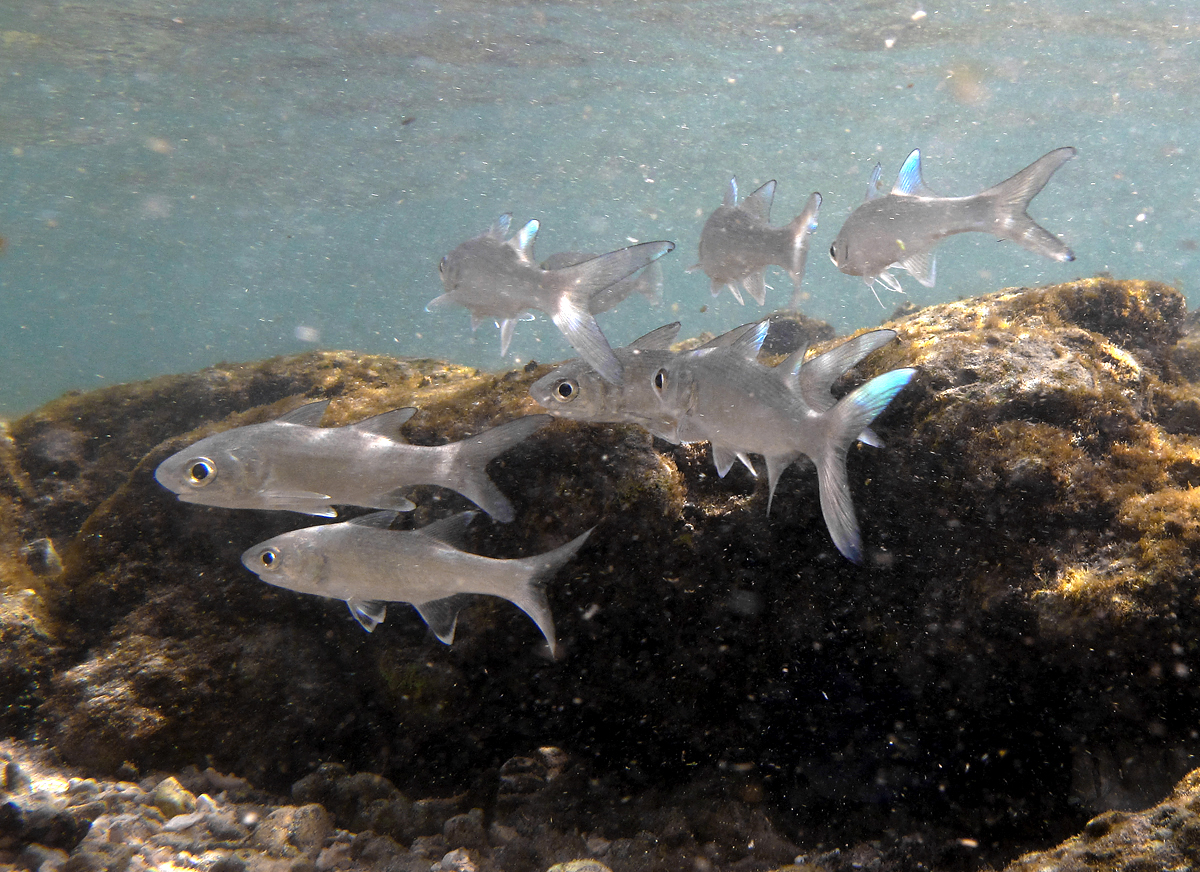
- Young Polydactylus plebeius

Scientific classification
- Kingdom: Animalia
- Phylum: Chordata
- Class: Actinopterygii
- Division: Teleostei
- Order: Carangiformes
- Suborder: Pleuronectoidei
- Family: Polynemidae
- Genus: Polydactylus; Lacépède, 1803

Type species
- Polydactylus plumierii, a synonym of Polydactylus virginicus Lacépède, 1803

= Polydactylus =

Polydactylus Temporal range: Middle Miocene–present

Genus of ray-finned fishes

Polydactylus is a genus of threadfin that mainly are native to the Indian, Atlantic and Pacific Oceans, especially in coastal or brackish waters (such as mangrove or estuaries). Some may even enter rivers and a single, P. macrophthalmus, is a freshwater fish from rivers in Borneo.

Most species do not surpass 72 cm (2.4 ft) in standard length, but two can reach up to 1.7–2 m (5.6–6.6 ft).

== Species ==
There are currently 21 species in the genus:

- Polydactylus approximans (Lay & Bennett, 1839) (Blue bobo)
- Polydactylus longipes Motomura, Okamoto & Iwatsuki, 2001 (Long-limb threadfin)
- Polydactylus luparensis Lim, Motomura & Gambang, 2010 (Sarawak giant threadfin)
- Polydactylus macrochir (Günther, 1867) (King threadfin)
- Polydactylus macrophthalmus (Bleeker, 1858) (River threadfin)
- Polydactylus malagasyensis Motomura & Iwatsuki, 2001 (African blackspot threadfin)
- Polydactylus microstomus (Bleeker, 1851) (Smallmouth threadfin)
- Polydactylus mullani (Hora, 1926) (Arabian blackspot threadfin)
- Polydactylus multiradiatus (Günther, 1860) (Australian threadfin)
- Polydactylus nigripinnis Munro, 1964 (Blackfin threadfin)
- Polydactylus octonemus (Girard, 1858) (Atlantic threadfin)
- Polydactylus oligodon (Günther, 1860) (Littlescale threadfin)
- Polydactylus opercularis Seale & Bean, 1907 (Yellow bobo)
- Polydactylus persicus Motomura & Iwatsuki, 2001 (Persian blackspot threadfin)
- Polydactylus quadrifilis (Cuvier, 1829) (Giant African threadfin)
- Polydactylus sextarius (Bloch & Schneider, 1801) (Blackspot threadfin)
- Polydactylus virginicus (Linnaeus, 1758) (Barbu)

The following fossil species are also known:

- †Polydactylus fossilis Daniltshenko, 1958 (Pliocene of Krasnodar, Russia)
- †Polydactylus frivolus Bannikov, 1989 (middle Miocene of North Caucasus, Russia)
