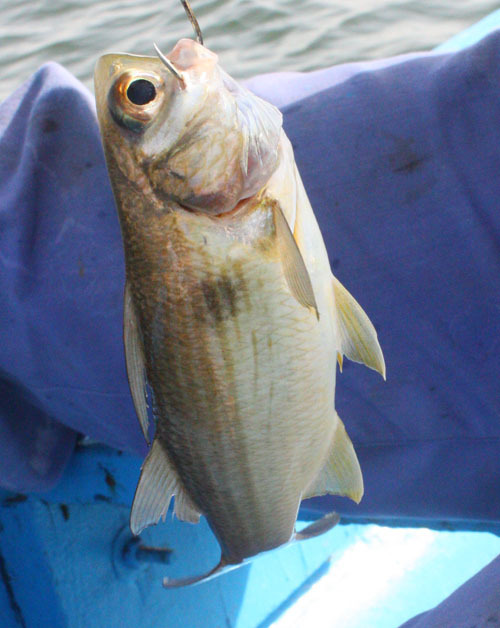

Conservation status
- Near Threatened (IUCN 3.1)

Scientific classification
- Kingdom: Animalia
- Phylum: Chordata
- Class: Actinopterygii
- Order: Carangiformes
- Suborder: Pleuronectoidei
- Family: Polynemidae
- Genus: Galeoides
- Species: G. decadactylus

Binomial name
- Galeoides decadactylus (Bloch, 1795)

Synonyms
- Polynemus decadactylus Bloch, 1795; Polynemus polydactylus Vahl, 1798; Galeoides polydactylus (Vahl, 1798); Polynemus enneadactylus Cuvier, 1829; Polynemus astrolabi Sauvage, 1881

= Lesser African threadfin =

Species of fish

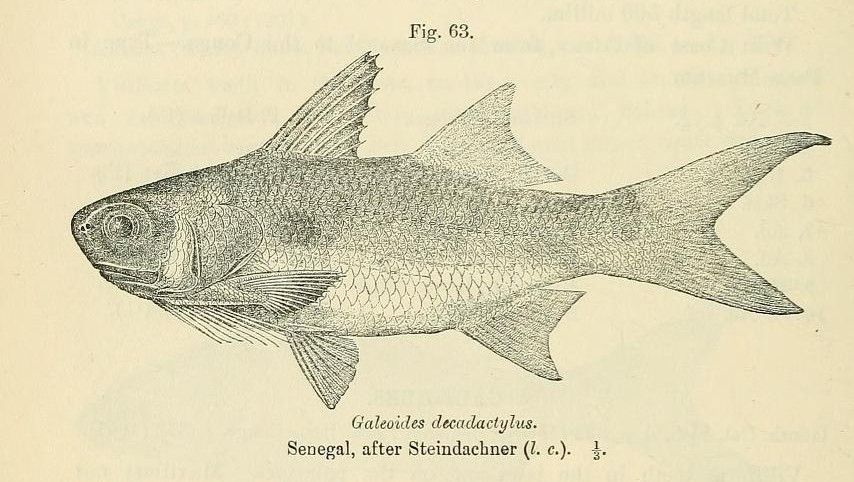
Galeoides decadactylus

The lesser African threadfin (Galeoides decadactylus) is a species of marine ray-finned fish, a threadfin from the family Polynemidae which is found in the eastern Atlantic Ocean off the western coast of Africa.

== Description ==
The lesser African threadfin has a rather compress, moderately elongated body with has a depth which is around one thirds of the standard length. The mouth has an inferior position and is overhung by the blunt snout. The jaws extend past the eye. It has two dorsal fins which are widely separated, the first dorsal fin has 8 weak spines and the second has a single spine and 13 or 14 soft rays while the anal fin has 3 spines and 11 or 12 soft rays. The second dorsal fin and anal fin have bases which are approximately equal in length. The pectoral fins are positioned low on the body, this fin has 9 or 10 detached threadlike lower rays. It has a count scales in the lateral line of 45–46. This species is a dull silvery colour, with a brownish to green tint in the back fading to whitish on the breast and belly. There is a large, round, dusky blotch directly below the first dorsal fin which sits beneath the lateral line at level of first dorsal fin, this blotch is similar in size to the eye. The lesser African threadfin can attain a total length of 50 centimetres (20 in) but 30 centimetres (12 in) is more normal.

== Distribution ==
The lesser African threadfin is found in the eastern Atlantic Ocean from Morocco south as far as Angola. It is also found around the Canary Islands and Cape Verde Islands and has been recorded off Namibia and in the Mediterranean Sea off Algeria.

== Habitat and biology ==
The lesser African threadfin occurs over muddy bottoms in shallow coastal waters at depths between 10 and 70 metres (33 and 230 ft), and they are often observed in estuaries and lagoons. Its diet is dominated by crustaceans but it will feed on small fishes. The stomach contents of specimens taken from the open sea had almost no detritus while those taken in estuaries had 31% of their stomach contents made up of detritus In a study near Lagos in Nigeria it was found that 25% of the females present had developed from the juvenile stage, i.e. had not been males, while the remainder had passed through a hermaphroditic phase having been males. Hermaphroditic fish are not reproductively functional. The sex composition of that population was 63.73% male, 22.22% hermaphroditic and 14.3% female. Spawning occurs throughout the year but peaks in the dry season and almost ceasesd during the rains. Most of these fish will not survive past the age of four years old.

== Human usage ==
The lesser African threadfin is an important quarry species in the commercial trawl fishery of the eastern Atlantic, and it makes up between 10 and 20% of the total landings by weight. In 2000-2006 the annual catch from western Africa averaged 15,600 tonnes, with the largest catches being landed in Nigeria, Ghana, and Gabon. In Senegal, it is regarded as an important coastal resource. Fishermen use beach seines, gillnets and shallow haul nets to catch this species. This species is highly regarded and is marketed fresh, dried salted or smoked.
