= List of fishes of the Red Sea =

The Red Sea is known for its richness and biodiversity.

== Demersal species ==
- Ambassidae
  - Ambassis gymnocephalus, bald glassy
  - Ambassis urotaenia, banded-tail glassy perchlet
- Apistidae
  - Apistus carinatus, ocellated waspfish
- Aploactinidae
  - Cocotropus steinitzi
  - Ptarmus gallus
- Apogonidae
  - Apogon gularis
  - Apogon hungi
  - Apogon micromaculatus
  - Apogon quadrifasciatus, twostripe cardinal
  - Apogon smithi, Smith's cardinalfish
  - Apogon spongicolus
  - Cheilodipterus novemstriatus, Indian Ocean twospot cardinalfish
  - Cheilodipterus pygmaios
  - Fowleria abocellata
  - Fowleria aurita
  - Fowleria isostigma
  - Fowleria marmorata
  - Fowleria variegata
  - Siphamia tubifer (S. permutata, synonym)
- Ariidae
  - Arius thalassinus, giant seacatfish
- Ariommatidae
  - Ariomma dollfusi
- Balistidae
  - Abalistes stellaris, starry triggerfish
- Batrachoididae
  - Thalassothia cirrhosa
- Belonidae
  - Tylosurus choram (Rüppell, 1837), Red Sea houndfish
  - Tylosurus crocodilus (Péron & Lesueur, 1821)
    - T. c. crocodilus (Péron & Lesueur, 1821), hound needlefish
- Blenniidae
  - Alloblennius jugularis, jugular blenny
  - Alloblennius pictus
  - Alticus kirkii, Kirk's blenny
  - Alticus saliens, leaping blenny
  - Antennablennius adenensis, Aden blenny
  - Antennablennius australis, moustached rockskipper
  - Antennablennius hypenetes, Arabian blenny
  - Ecsenius dentex
  - Entomacrodus epalzeocheilos, fringelip rockskipper
  - Hirculops cornifer, highbrow rockskipper
  - Istiblennius flaviumbrinus
  - Istiblennius pox, scarface rockskipper
  - Istiblennius unicolor, pallid rockskipper
  - Omobranchus fasciolatus, Arab blenny
  - Omobranchus steinitzi
  - Parablennius cyclops
  - Petroscirtes ancylodon, Arabian fangblenny
  - Xiphasia matsubarai, Japanese snake blenny
  - Xiphasia setifer, hairtail blenny
- Bothidae
  - Bothus myriaster, Indo-Pacific oval flounder
  - Bothus tricirrhitus
  - Engyprosopon hureaui, Hureau's flounder
  - Engyprosopon latifrons
  - Engyprosopon macrolepis
  - Engyprosopon maldivensis, olive wide-eyed flounder
- Callionymidae
  - Callionymus bentuviai
  - Callionymus erythraeus, smallhead dragonet
  - Callionymus filamentosus, blotchfin dragonet
  - Callionymus gardineri, longtail dragone
  - Callionymus marleyi, sand dragonet
  - Callionymus muscatensis, Muscat dragonet
  - Callionymus oxycephalus
  - Diplogrammus infulatus, sawspine dragonet
  - Diplogrammus randalli
  - Synchiropus sechellensis
- Caproidae
  - Antigonia indica
- Carcharhinidae
  - Loxodon macrorhinus, sliteye shark
- Congridae
  - Diploconger polystigmatus
  - Gorgasia cotroneii
  - Gorgasia sillneri
  - Heteroconger balteatus
  - Uroconger lepturus, slender conger
- Creediidae
  - Limnichthys nitidus, sand submarine
- Cynoglossidae
  - Cynoglossus arel, largescale tonguesole
  - Cynoglossus bilineatus, fourlined tonguesole
  - Cynoglossus dollfusi
  - Cynoglossus gilchristi, ripplefin tonguesole
  - Cynoglossus kopsii, shortheaded tonguesole
  - Cynoglossus lachneri, Lachner's tonguesole
  - Cynoglossus lingua, long tongue sole
  - Cynoglossus pottii
  - Cynoglossus sealarki
- Cyprinodontidae
  - Aphanius dispar dispar
- Dactylopteridae
  - Dactyloptena peterseni, starry flying gurnard
- Dasyatidae
  - Dasyatis bennetti, Bennett's stingray
  - Himantura gerrardi, sharpnose stingray
  - Himantura imbricata, scaly whipray
- Gerreidae
  - Gerres filamentosus, whipfin silverbiddy
- Gobiesocidae
  - Lepadichthys erythraeus
- Gobiidae
  - Amblyeleotris triguttata, triplespot shrimpgoby
  - Amblygobius magnusi
  - Amoya signatus, tusk goby
  - Arcygobius baliurus
  - Callogobius amikami
  - Callogobius dori
  - Callogobius flavobrunneus, slimy goby
  - Coryogalops anomolus, anomalous goby
  - Coryphopterus humeralis
  - Cryptocentroides arabicus, Arabian goby
  - Favonigobius reichei, Indo-Pacific tropical sand goby
  - Fusigobius maximus
  - Gobius koseirensis
  - Gobius leucomelas
  - Hetereleotris diademata
  - Hetereleotris vulgaris, common goby
  - Opua elati
  - Pleurosicya prognatha
  - Pomatoschistus marmoratus, marbled goby
  - Psilogobius randalli
  - Silhouettea aegyptia, Red Sea goby
  - Silhouettea chaimi
  - Silhouettea insinuans, phantom goby
  - Trimma filamentosus
- Gymnuridae
  - Gymnura poecilura, longtail butterfly ray
- Haemulidae
  - Plectorhinchus faetela
  - Pomadasys argenteus, silver grunt
  - Pomadasys hasta
  - Pomadasys multimaculatum, cock grunter
  - Pomadasys punctulatus, lined grunt
- Hemigaleidae
  - Hemipristis elongata, snaggletooth shark
- Holocentridae
  - Sargocentron marisrubri
- Kraemeriidae
  - Kraemeria nuda
- Labridae
  - Cheilinus abudjubbe
  - Pteragogus pelycus, sideburn wrasse
  - Suezichthys caudavittatus, spottail wrasse
  - Suezichthys russelli, Russell's wrasse
  - Xyrichtys bimaculatus, two-spot razorfish
  - Xyrichtys javanicus
  - Xyrichtys niger
- Leiognathidae
  - Gazza minuta, toothpony
  - Leiognathus berbis, Berber ponyfish
  - Leiognathus bindus, orangefin ponyfish
  - Leiognathus elongatus, slender ponyfish
  - Leiognathus equulus, common ponyfish
  - Leiognathus fasciatus, striped ponyfish
  - Leiognathus klunzingeri
  - Leiognathus leuciscus, whipfin ponyfish
  - Leiognathus lineolatus, ornate ponyfish
  - Leiognathus splendens, splendid ponyfish
  - Secutor insidiator, pugnose ponyfish
  - Secutor ruconius, deep pugnose ponyfish
- Liparidae
  - Liparis fishelsoni
- Lophiidae
  - Lophiomus setigerus, blackmouth angler
- Lutjanidae
  - Pristipomoides multidens, goldbanded jobfish
- Malacanthidae
  - Branchiostegus sawakinensis, freckled tilefish
  - Hoplolatilus oreni
- Microdesmidae
  - Paragunnellichthys springeri
  - Brachaluteres baueri
  - Paraluteres arqat
  - Paramonacanthus frenatus, wedgetail filefish
  - Paramonacanthus oblongus, hair-finned filefish
  - Paramonacanthus pusillus
  - Stephanolepis diaspros, reticulated leatherjacket
- Mugilidae
  - Liza macrolepis, largescale mullet
  - Liza subviridis, greenback mullet
  - Liza tade, Tade mullet
  - Valamugil cunnesius, longarm mullet
- Mullidae
  - Upeneus pori, Por's goatfish
  - Upeneus sulphureus, sulphur goatfish
- Muraenesocidae
  - Congresox talabonoides, Indian pike conger
  - Muraenesox cinereus, daggertooth pike conger
- Muraenidae
  - Gymnothorax angusticauda
  - Gymnothorax griseus
  - Gymnothorax herrei
  - Gymnothorax johnsoni, whitespotted moray
  - Gymnothorax tile
  - Uropterygius genie
  - Uropterygius golanii
- Narcinidae
  - Heteronarce bentuviai, Elat electric ray
- Nemipteridae
  - Nemipterus bipunctatus, Delagoa threadfin bream
  - Nemipterus japonicus, Japanese threadfin bream
  - Nemipterus peronii, notchedfin threadfin bream
  - Nemipterus randalli, Randall's threadfin bream
  - Nemipterus zysron, slender threadfin bream
  - Parascolopsis aspinosa, smooth dwarf monocle bream
  - Parascolopsis eriomma, rosy dwarf monocle bream
  - Parascolopsis inermis, unarmed dwarf monocle bream
  - Parascolopsis townsendi, scaly dwarf monocle bream
- Nettastomatidae
  - Saurenchelys lateromaculatus
- Ophichthidae
  - Myrophis microchir
  - Skythrenchelys lentiginosa
  - Yirrkala tenuis, thin sand-eel
- Ophidiidae
  - Ophidion smithi
  - Sirembo jerdoni, brown-banded cusk-eel
- Opistognathidae
  - Stalix davidsheni
- Paralichthyidae
  - Pseudorhombus arsius, largetooth flounder
  - Pseudorhombus elevatus, deep flounder
- Pempheridae
  - Pempheris mangula, black-edged sweeper
- Pinguipedidae
  - Parapercis robinsoni, smallscale grubfish
  - Parapercis simulata
  - Parapercis somaliensis, Somali sandperch
- Platycephalidae
  - Grammoplites suppositus, spotfin flathead
  - Platycephalus micracanthus
  - Rogadius asper, olive-tailed flathead
  - Rogadius pristiger, thorny flathead
  - Sorsogona prionota, blackblotch flathead
- Plesiopidae
  - Plesiops mystaxus, moustache longfin
- Polynemidae
  - Polydactylus plebeius, striped threadfin
  - Polydactylus sextarius, blackspot threadfin
- Pomacentridae
  - Chromis axillaris, grey chromis
  - Neopomacentrus taeniurus, freshwater demoiselle
  - Neopomacentrus miryae
- Priacanthidae
  - Priacanthus sagittarius, arrow bulleye
- Pristidae
  - Pristis zijsron, longcomb sawfish
- Psettodidae
  - Psettodes erumei, Indian spiny turbot
- Pseudochromidae
  - Chlidichthys auratus
  - Chlidichthys rubiceps
- Ptereleotridae
  - Ptereleotris arabica
- Rhinobatidae
  - Rhinobatos granulatus, sharpnose guitarfish
  - Rhinobatos schlegelii, yellow guitarfish
- Samaridae
  - Samaris cristatus, cockatoo righteye flounder
- Scorpaenidae
  - Brachypterois serrulata
  - Scorpaenodes steinitzi
- Serranidae
  - Epinephelus epistictus, dotted grouper
  - Epinephelus latifasciatus, striped grouper
  - Epinephelus radiatus, oblique-banded grouper
  - Serranus cabrilla, comber
- Soleidae
  - Aseraggodes sinusarabici
  - Aseraggodes steinitzi
  - Brachirus orientalis, Oriental sole
  - Solea elongata, elongate sole
  - Synaptura commersonnii, Commerson's sole
- Sparidae
  - Acanthopagrus berda, picnic seabream
  - Acanthopagrus latus, yellowfin seabream
  - Argyrops megalommatus
  - Argyrops spinifer, king soldierbream
  - Crenidens crenidens, karenteen seabream
  - Lithognathus mormyrus, striped seabream
- Synanceiidae
  - Choridactylus multibarbus, orangebanded stingfish
  - Minous coccineus, onestick stingfish
  - Minous inermis, Alcock's scorpionfish
  - Minous monodactylus, grey stingfish
  - Synanceia nana, Red Sea stonefish
- Syngnathidae
  - Dunckerocampus boylei, broad-banded pipefish
  - Hippichthys cyanospilos, blue-spotted pipefish
  - Hippichthys spicifer, bellybarred pipefish
  - Hippocampus fuscus, sea pony
  - Hippocampus jayakari, Jayakar's seahorse
  - Hippocampus lichtensteinii, Lichtenstein's seahorse
  - Lissocampus bannwarthi
  - Siokunichthys herrei
  - Syngnathus macrophthalmus
  - Syngnathus safina
  - Trachyrhamphus longirostris
- Synodontidae
  - Synodus hoshinonis, blackear lizardfish
  - Synodus macrops, triplecross lizardfish
- Terapontidae
  - Terapon jarbua, jarbua terapon
- Tetraodontidae
  - Lagocephalus lunaris, green rough-backed puffer
  - Lagocephalus spadiceus, half-smooth golden pufferfish
- Tetrarogidae
  - Vespicula bottae
- Torpedinidae
  - Torpedo panthera, panther electric ray
  - Torpedo suessii
- Triakidae
  - Mustelus mosis, Arabian smooth-hound
- Trichonotidae
  - Trichonotus nikii
- Triglidae
  - Lepidotrigla bispinosa, bullhorn gurnard
  - Lepidotrigla spiloptera, spotwing gurnard
- Tripterygiidae
  - Enneapterygius clarkae, barred triplefin
  - Enneapterygius destai
  - Enneapterygius obscurus
  - Enneapterygius pusillus, highcrest triplefin
  - Helcogramma obtusirostris, hotlips triplefin
- Uranoscopidae
  - Uranoscopus bauchotae
  - Uranoscopus dahlakensis
  - Uranoscopus dollfusi, Dollfus' stargazer
  - Uranoscopus fuscomaculatus
  - Uranoscopus guttatus
  - Uranoscopus oligolepis

== Pelagic species ==
- Alopiidae
  - Alopias vulpinus, thintail thresher
- Belonidae
  - Platybelone argalus platura
  - Tylosurus choram, Red Sea houndfish
- Bregmacerotidae
  - Bregmaceros arabicus
  - Bregmaceros mcclellandi, spotted codlet
  - Bregmaceros nectabanus, smallscale codlet
- Carangidae
  - Alepes vari, herring scad
  - Carangoides ciliarius
  - Caranx sansun
  - Decapterus macarellus, mackerel scad
- Chirocentridae
  - Chirocentrus nudus, whitefin wolf-herring
- Clupeidae
  - Amblygaster leiogaster, smooth-belly sardinella
  - Dussumieria acuta, rainbow sardine
  - Dussumieria elopsoides, slender rainbow sardine
  - Etrumeus teres, round herring
  - Herklotsichthys lossei, gulf herring
  - Herklotsichthys punctatus, spotback herring
  - Hilsa kelee, kelee shad
  - Sardinella longiceps, Indian oil sardine
  - Spratelloides gracilis, silver-stripe round herring
- Coryphaenidae
  - Coryphaena equiselis, pompano dolphinfish
  - Coryphaena hippurus, common dolphinfish
- Echeneidae
  - Remora brachyptera, spearfish remora
  - Remorina albescens, white suckerfish
- Elopidae
  - Elops machnata, tenpounder
- Engraulidae
  - Engraulis encrasicolus, European anchovy
  - Stolephorus indicus, Indian anchovy
  - Thryssa setirostris, longjaw thryssa
- Exocoetidae
  - Cheilopogon cyanopterus, margined flyingfish
  - Cheilopogon pinnatibarbatus altipennis, smallhead flyingfish
  - Cypselurus oligolepis, largescale flyingfish
  - Exocoetus volitans, tropical two-wing flyingfish
  - Hirundichthys rondeletii, black wing flyingfish
  - Hirundichthys socotranus
  - Parexocoetus brachypterus, sailfin flyingfish
  - Parexocoetus mento, African sailfin flyingfish
- Hemiramphidae
  - Euleptorhamphus viridis, ribbon halfbeak
  - Hemiramphus marginatus, yellowtip halfbeak
  - Hyporhamphus xanthopterus, red-tipped halfbeak
- Istiophoridae
  - Istiophorus platypterus, Indo-Pacific sailfish
  - Makaira indica, black marlin
  - Tetrapturus audax, striped marlin
- Lactariidae
  - Lactarius lactarius, false trevally
- Leiognathidae
  - Leiognathus oblongus, oblong ponyfish
- Malacanthidae
  - Hoplolatilus geo
- Molidae
  - Mola mola, ocean sunfish
  - Ranzania laevis, slender sunfish
- Monodactylidae
  - Monodactylus argenteus, silver moony
- Mugilidae
  - Liza carinata, keeled mullet
- Myliobatidae
  - Manta ehrenbergii
  - Mobula thurstoni, smoothtail mobula
- Rhincodontidae
  - Rhincodon typus, whale shark
- Scombridae
  - Auxis rochei rochei, bullet tuna
  - Auxis thazard thazard, frigate tuna
  - Euthynnus affinis, kawakawa
  - Katsuwonus pelamis, skipjack tuna
  - Rastrelliger kanagurta, Indian mackerel
  - Sarda orientalis, striped bonito
  - Scomber japonicus, chub mackerel
  - Scomberomorus commerson, narrow-barred Spanish mackerel
  - Thunnus albacares, yellowfin tuna
  - Thunnus tonggol, longtail tuna
- Serranidae
  - Plectranthias klausewitzi
- Sphyraenidae
  - Sphyraena chrysotaenia, yellowstripe barracuda
  - Saurida macrolepis
- Xiphiidae
  - Xiphias gladius, swordfish

== See also ==
- List of sharks in the Red Sea
- List of deep water fish of the Red Sea
- List of reef fish of the Red Sea
