= Stinkfish =

Stinkfish may refer to several kinds of fish:

- Australian stinkfish (Callionymus australis)
- Bight stinkfish (Foetorepus phasis)
- Common stinkfish (Foetorepus calauropomus)
- Goodlad's stinkfish (Callionymus goodladi)
- Gross's stinkfish (Callionymus grossi)
- Queensland stinkfish (Callionymus moretonensis)

== See also ==
- The Siren Six!, an American ska band originally titled Stinkfish
