= Callionymus ogilbyi =

Scientific classification
- Kingdom: Animalia
- Phylum: Chordata
- Class: Actinopterygii
- Order: Syngnathiformes
- Family: Callionymidae
- Genus: Callionymus
- Species: C. ogilbyi

Binomial name
- Callionymus ogilbyi R. Fricke, 2002

Species of fish

Callionymus ogilbyi, the Eastern Australian longtail dragonet, is a species of dragonet endemic to the Pacific waters off of New South Wales, Australia. The specific name honours the Irish-Australian zoologist and taxonomist James Douglas Ogilby (1853-1925).
