= Callionymus whiteheadi =

Conservation status
- Data Deficient (IUCN 3.1)

Scientific classification
- Domain: Eukaryota
- Kingdom: Animalia
- Phylum: Chordata
- Class: Actinopterygii
- Order: Callionymiformes
- Family: Callionymidae
- Genus: Callionymus
- Species: C. whiteheadi

Binomial name
- Callionymus whiteheadi R. Fricke, 1981

Species of fish

Callionymus whiteheadi, Whitehead's deepwater dragonet, is a species of dragonet found in the Pacific waters around Indonesia. The specific name honours the ichthyologist Peter James Palmer Whitehead (1930-1992).
