= Callionymus stigmatopareius =

Scientific classification
- Kingdom: Animalia
- Phylum: Chordata
- Class: Actinopterygii
- Order: Syngnathiformes
- Family: Callionymidae
- Genus: Callionymus
- Species: C. stigmatopareius

Binomial name
- Callionymus stigmatopareius R. Fricke, 1981

Species of fish

Callionymus stigmatopareius, the Mozambique dragonet, is a species of dragonet only known from the Indian Ocean off of Mozambique.
