= Callionymus tethys =

Scientific classification
- Kingdom: Animalia
- Phylum: Chordata
- Class: Actinopterygii
- Order: Syngnathiformes
- Family: Callionymidae
- Genus: Callionymus
- Species: C. tethys

Binomial name
- Callionymus tethys R. Fricke, 1993

Species of fish

Callionymus tethys, the Tethys dragonet, is a species of dragonet native to the Pacific waters around New Caledonia.
