= Callionymus kanakorum =

Scientific classification
- Domain: Eukaryota
- Kingdom: Animalia
- Phylum: Chordata
- Class: Actinopterygii
- Order: Callionymiformes
- Family: Callionymidae
- Genus: Callionymus
- Species: C. kanakorum

Binomial name
- Callionymus kanakorum R. Fricke, 2006

Species of fish

Callionymus kanakorum is a species of dragonet endemic to the waters around New Caledonia where it is found at depths of from 110 to 800 metres (360 to 2,620 ft). This species grows to a length of 6.8 centimetres (2.7 in) SL.
