= Callionymus ochiaii =

Scientific classification
- Kingdom: Animalia
- Phylum: Chordata
- Class: Actinopterygii
- Order: Syngnathiformes
- Family: Callionymidae
- Genus: Callionymus
- Species: C. ochiaii

Binomial name
- Callionymus ochiaii R. Fricke, 1981

Species of fish

Callionymus ochiaii, the Japanese lowfin deepwater dragonet, is a species of dragonet found in the Pacific waters around Japan. The specific name honours the Japanese ichthyologist Akira Ochiai (born 1923).
