= Callionymus bleekeri =

Bleeker's deepwater dragonet

Scientific classification
- Domain: Eukaryota
- Kingdom: Animalia
- Phylum: Chordata
- Class: Actinopterygii
- Order: Callionymiformes
- Family: Callionymidae
- Genus: Callionymus
- Species: C. bleekeri

Binomial name
- Callionymus bleekeri R. Fricke, 1983

Species of fish

Callionymus bleekeri, Bleeker's deepwater dragonet, is a species of dragonet endemic to the Pacific Ocean waters around Indonesia. The specific name honours the Dutch ichthyologist and surgeon Pieter Bleeker (1819–1878).
