= Callionymus guentheri =

Scientific classification
- Domain: Eukaryota
- Kingdom: Animalia
- Phylum: Chordata
- Class: Actinopterygii
- Order: Callionymiformes
- Family: Callionymidae
- Genus: Callionymus
- Species: C. guentheri

Binomial name
- Callionymus guentheri R. Fricke, 1981

Species of fish

Callionymus guentheri, Günther's deepwater dragonet, is a species of dragonet endemic to the Pacific waters of the Philippines. The specific name honours the ichthyologist Albert Günther (1830–1914).
