= Callionymus aagilis =

Scientific classification
- Domain: Eukaryota
- Kingdom: Animalia
- Phylum: Chordata
- Class: Actinopterygii
- Order: Callionymiformes
- Family: Callionymidae
- Genus: Callionymus
- Species: C. aagilis

Binomial name
- Callionymus aagilis R. Fricke, 1999

Species of fish

Callionymus aagilis, the slow dragonet, is a species of dragonet native to the Indian Ocean around Réunion and Mauritius. This species grows to a length of 12.5 centimetres (4.9 in) SL.
