= Callionymus altipinnis =

Scientific classification
- Domain: Eukaryota
- Kingdom: Animalia
- Phylum: Chordata
- Class: Actinopterygii
- Order: Callionymiformes
- Family: Callionymidae
- Genus: Callionymus
- Species: C. altipinnis

Binomial name
- Callionymus altipinnis R. Fricke, 1981

Species of fish

Callionymus altipinnis, the highfin deepwater dragonet, is a species of dragonet native to the Pacific Ocean around China, Taiwan and Vietnam.
