= Callionymus bifilum =

Scientific classification
- Domain: Eukaryota
- Kingdom: Animalia
- Phylum: Chordata
- Class: Actinopterygii
- Order: Callionymiformes
- Family: Callionymidae
- Genus: Callionymus
- Species: C. bifilum

Binomial name
- Callionymus bifilum R. Fricke, 2000

Species of fish

Callionymus bifilum, the Northwestern Australian deepwater dragonet, is a species of dragonet native to the Indian Ocean off of western Australia.
