= Mauritius dragonet =

Scientific classification
- Domain: Eukaryota
- Kingdom: Animalia
- Phylum: Chordata
- Class: Actinopterygii
- Order: Callionymiformes
- Family: Callionymidae
- Genus: Callionymus
- Species: C. mascarenus

Binomial name
- Callionymus mascarenus R. Fricke, 1983

Species of fish

The Mauritius dragonet (Callionymus mascarenus) is a species of dragonet endemic to the Indian Ocean waters around Mauritius. This species grows to a length of 4.9 centimetres (1.9 in) SL.
