= Callionymus kailolae =

Scientific classification
- Domain: Eukaryota
- Kingdom: Animalia
- Phylum: Chordata
- Class: Actinopterygii
- Order: Callionymiformes
- Family: Callionymidae
- Genus: Callionymus
- Species: C. kailolae

Binomial name
- Callionymus kailolae R. Fricke, 2000

Species of fish

Callionymus kailolae, Kailola's deepwater dragonet or the Northwestern ocellated dragonet, is a species of dragonet native to the Indian Ocean off of western Australia where this deep-water species is found at depths of from 200 to 204 metres (656 to 669 ft). The specific name honours Patricia Kailola of Newnham, Tasmania who published a photograph of the new species, "in appreciation of her interest in callionymid fish research".
