= Callionymus regani =

Scientific classification
- Domain: Eukaryota
- Kingdom: Animalia
- Phylum: Chordata
- Class: Actinopterygii
- Order: Callionymiformes
- Family: Callionymidae
- Genus: Callionymus
- Species: C. regani

Binomial name
- Callionymus regani Nakabo, 1979

Species of fish

Callionymus regani, Regan’s deepwater dragonet, is a species of dragonet known only from the Saya de Malha Bank in the Indian Ocean at depths of around 148 metres (486 ft). The specific name honours the British ichthyologist Charles Tate Regan (1878-1943).
