= Callionymus draconis =

Scientific classification
- Domain: Eukaryota
- Kingdom: Animalia
- Phylum: Chordata
- Class: Actinopterygii
- Order: Callionymiformes
- Family: Callionymidae
- Genus: Callionymus
- Species: C. draconis

Binomial name
- Callionymus draconis Nakabo, 1977

Species of fish

Callionymus draconis, the Japanese spiny dragonet, is a species of dragonet native to temperate regions of the Indian and Pacific oceans around Japan and western Australia where it occurs at depths of around 138 metres (453 ft). This species grows to a length of 9 centimetres (3.5 in) SL.
