= Callionymus octostigmatus =

Scientific classification
- Kingdom: Animalia
- Phylum: Chordata
- Class: Actinopterygii
- Order: Syngnathiformes
- Family: Callionymidae
- Genus: Callionymus
- Species: C. octostigmatus

Binomial name
- Callionymus octostigmatus R. Fricke, 1981

Species of fish

Callionymus octostigmatus, the eightspot dragonet, is a species of dragonet native to the central western Pacific Ocean where it occurs at depths of from 49 to 148 metres (161 to 486 ft). This species grows to a length of 15 centimetres (5.9 in) TL.
