= Callionymus obscurus =

Scientific classification
- Kingdom: Animalia
- Phylum: Chordata
- Class: Actinopterygii
- Order: Syngnathiformes
- Family: Callionymidae
- Genus: Callionymus
- Species: C. obscurus

Binomial name
- Callionymus obscurus R. Fricke, 1989

Species of fish

Callionymus obscurus, or the obscure dragonet, is a species of dragonet native to the Pacific waters off of Indonesia where it is found at depths down to 40 metres (130 ft).
