= Callionymus acutirostris =

Scientific classification
- Domain: Eukaryota
- Kingdom: Animalia
- Phylum: Chordata
- Class: Actinopterygii
- Order: Callionymiformes
- Family: Callionymidae
- Genus: Callionymus
- Species: C. acutirostris

Binomial name
- Callionymus acutirostris R. Fricke, 1981

Species of fish

Callionymus acutirostris, the pointed dragonet, is a species of dragonet native to the Pacific Ocean around the Philippines. It is a demersal fish found at an ocean depth of 64-81m.
