= Callionymus afilum =

Scientific classification
- Domain: Eukaryota
- Kingdom: Animalia
- Phylum: Chordata
- Class: Actinopterygii
- Order: Callionymiformes
- Family: Callionymidae
- Genus: Callionymus
- Species: C. afilum

Binomial name
- Callionymus afilum R. Fricke, 2000

Species of fish

Callionymus afilum, the Northern Australian longtail dragonet, is a species of dragonet native to the Pacific Ocean around Papua New Guinea and Australia.
