= Callionymus sereti =

Scientific classification
- Kingdom: Animalia
- Phylum: Chordata
- Class: Actinopterygii
- Order: Syngnathiformes
- Family: Callionymidae
- Genus: Callionymus
- Species: C. sereti

Binomial name
- Callionymus sereti R. Fricke, 1998

Species of fish

Callionymus sereti, Séret’s dragonet, is a species of dragonet endemic to the Pacific Ocean around Futuna Island where it occurs at depths of from 245 to 400 metres (804 to 1,312 ft). The specific name honours Bernard Séret, an ichthyologist at the Muséum National d'Histoire Naturelle in France.
