= Callionymus formosanus =

Scientific classification
- Domain: Eukaryota
- Kingdom: Animalia
- Phylum: Chordata
- Class: Actinopterygii
- Order: Callionymiformes
- Family: Callionymidae
- Genus: Callionymus
- Species: C. formosanus

Binomial name
- Callionymus formosanus R. Fricke, 1981

Species of fish

Callionymus formosanus, the Taiwanese deepwater dragonet, is a species of dragonet native to the Pacific Ocean from the South China Sea as well as around southern Japan and the Chesterfield Islands. This species grows to a length of 17 centimetres (6.7 in) SL.
