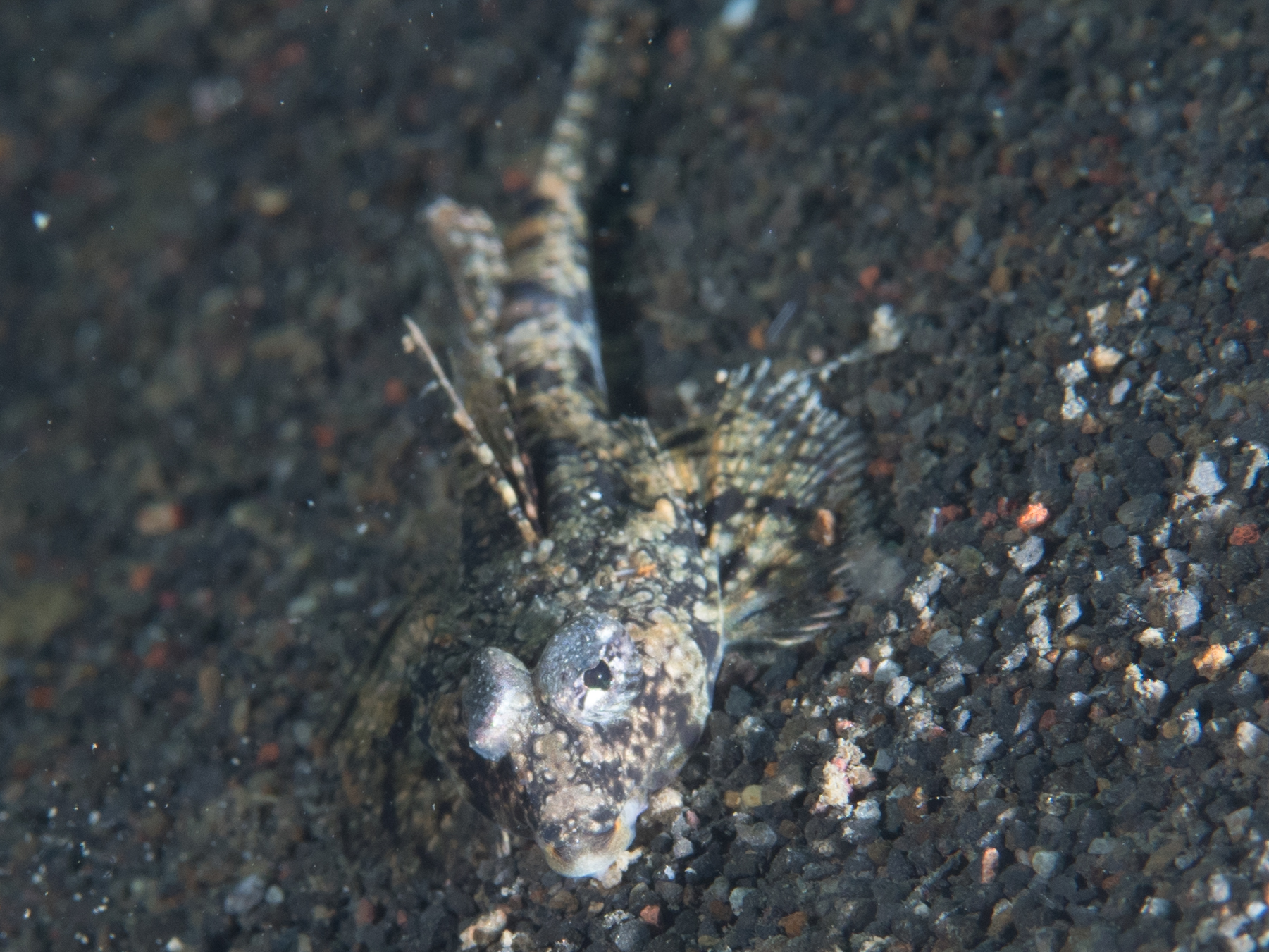
- Proud dragonet (Callionymus superbus)

Conservation status
- Least Concern (IUCN 3.1)

Scientific classification
- Kingdom: Animalia
- Phylum: Chordata
- Class: Actinopterygii
- Order: Syngnathiformes
- Family: Callionymidae
- Genus: Callionymus
- Species: C. superbus

Binomial name
- Callionymus superbus R. Fricke, 1983

Synonyms
- Calliurichthys superbus (Fricke, 1983)

= Callionymus superbus =

Proud dragonet

Species of fish

Callionymus superbus, the proud dragonet or superb dragonet, is a species of dragonet native to the western Pacific Ocean, where it occurs at depths of up to 25 metres (82 ft). This species grows to a length of 20 centimetres (7.9 in) TL.
