= Callionymus marquesensis =

Scientific classification
- Domain: Eukaryota
- Kingdom: Animalia
- Phylum: Chordata
- Class: Actinopterygii
- Order: Callionymiformes
- Family: Callionymidae
- Genus: Callionymus
- Species: C. marquesensis

Binomial name
- Callionymus marquesensis R. Fricke, 1989

Species of fish

Callionymus marquesensis, the Marquesas ruddertail dragonet, is a species of dragonet native to the Pacific Ocean around the Marquesan Islands. This species grows to a length of 2.1 centimetres (0.83 in) SL.
