= Callionymus alisae =

Scientific classification
- Kingdom: Animalia
- Phylum: Chordata
- Class: Actinopterygii
- Order: Syngnathiformes
- Family: Callionymidae
- Genus: Callionymus
- Species: C. alisae

Binomial name
- Callionymus alisae Fricke, 2016

Species of fish

Callionymus alisae is a species of dragonet which was described in 2016 from a male specimen collected by a grab dredge as a depth of 90-228 m, southwest of Kavieng, New Ireland, Papua New Guinea. The specimen is yellowish in colour, becoming darker towards the tail and white on the underside, it has dark blue eyes and greyish spots on its body. It was named after the French research vessel which collected the only specimen known so far, the R.V. Alis.
