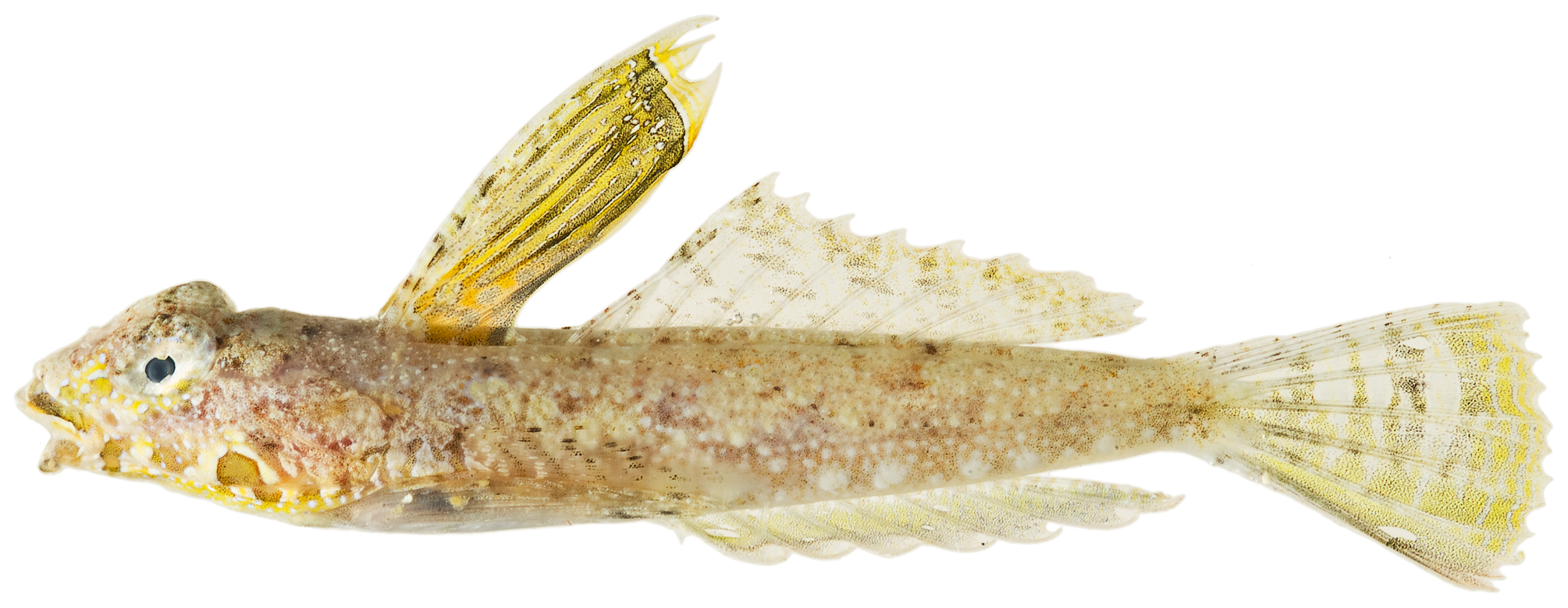
- Callionymus bairdi
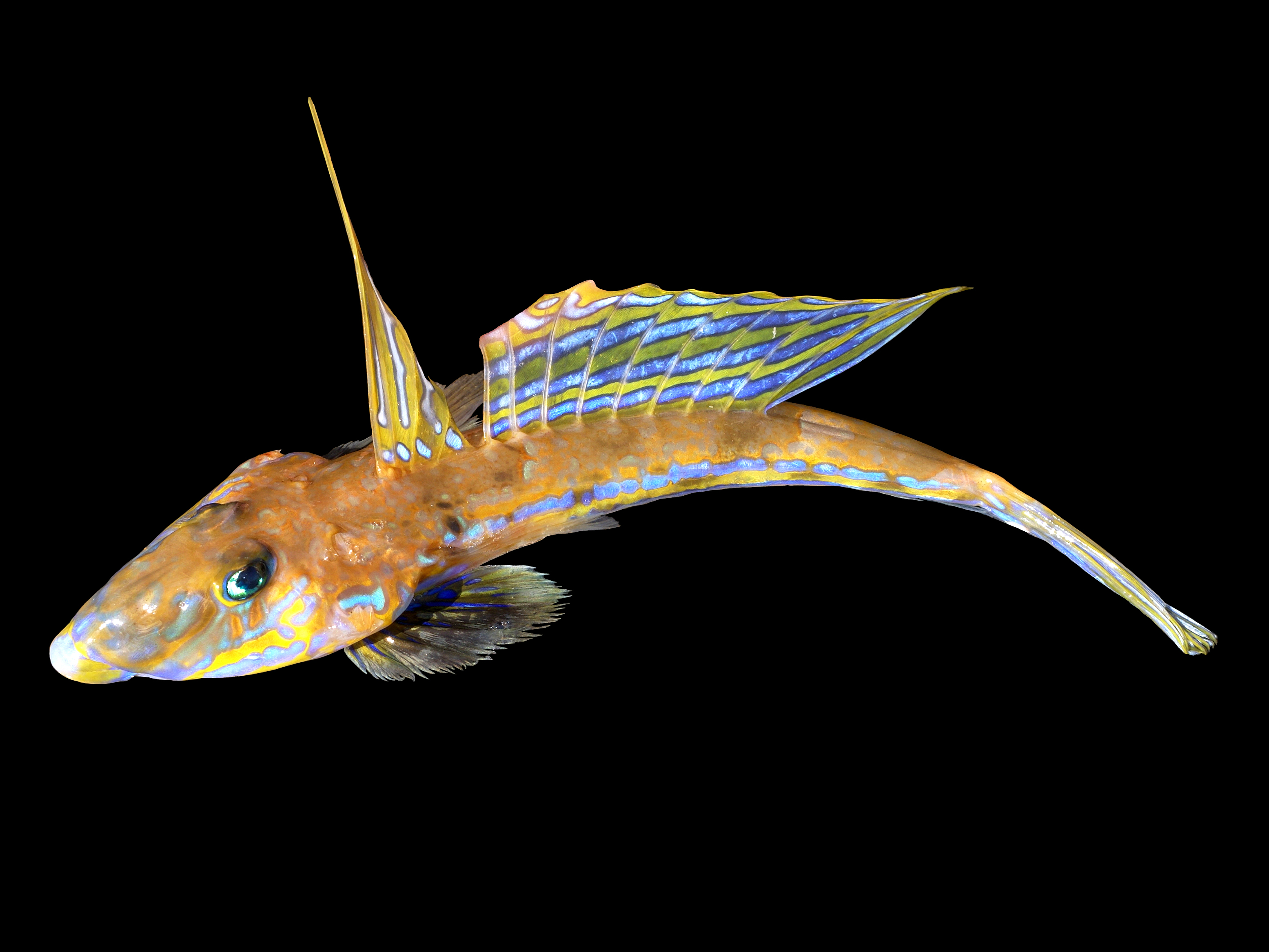
- Callionymus lyra

Scientific classification
- Kingdom: Animalia
- Phylum: Chordata
- Class: Actinopterygii
- Division: Teleostei
- Order: Syngnathiformes
- Family: Callionymidae
- Genus: Callionymus; Linnaeus, 1758

Type species
- Callionymus lyra Linnaeus, 1758

Synonyms
- Paradiplogrammus Nakabo, 1982; Spinicapitichthys Fricke, 1980

= Callionymus =

Callionymus Temporal range: Middle Miocene–present

Genus of fishes

Callionymus is a genus of dragonets found mostly in the Indian and Pacific oceans with a few species occurring in the Atlantic Ocean.

== Species ==
There are currently 110 recognized species in this genus:

- Callionymus aagilis R. Fricke, 1999 (Slow dragonet)
- Callionymus acutirostris R. Fricke, 1981 (Pointed dragonet)
- Callionymus afilum R. Fricke, 2000 (Northern Australian longtail dragonet)
- Callionymus africanus (Kotthaus, 1977) (African deepwater dragonet)
- Callionymus alisae R. Fricke, 2016 (Alis dragonet)
- Callionymus altipinnis R. Fricke, 1981 (High-fin deepwater dragonet)
- Callionymus amboina Suwardji, 1965 (Ambon darter dragonet)
- Callionymus annulatus M. C. W. Weber, 1913 (Big-head dragonet)
- Callionymus australis R. Fricke, 1983 (Australian dragonet)
- Callionymus bairdi D. S. Jordan, 1888 (Lancer dragonet)
- Callionymus belcheri J. Richardson, 1844 (Belcher's dragonet)
- Callionymus beniteguri D. S. Jordan & Snyder, 1900 (White-spotted dragonet)
- Callionymus bentuviai R. Fricke, 1981 (Ben-Tuvia's deepwater dragonet)
- Callionymus bifilum R. Fricke, 2000 (Northwestern Australian deepwater dragonet)
- Callionymus bleekeri R. Fricke, 1983 (Bleeker's deepwater dragonet)
- Callionymus boucheti R. Fricke, 2017 (Bouchet's dragonet)
- Callionymus brevianalis R. Fricke, 1983 (Small ruddertail dragonet)
- Callionymus caeruleonotatus C. H. Gilbert, 1905 (Blue-spotted dragonet)
- Callionymus carebares Alcock, 1890 (Indian deepwater dragonet)
- Callionymus colini R. Fricke, 1993 (Tiny New Guinea longtail dragonet)
- Callionymus comptus J. E. Randall, 1999 (Ornamented dragonet)
- Callionymus cooperi Regan, 1908 (Cooper's dragonet)
- Callionymus curvicornis Valenciennes, 1837 (Horn dragonet)
- Callionymus curvispinis R. Fricke & Zaiser, 1993 (Izu ruddertail dragonet)
- Callionymus decoratus (C. H. Gilbert, 1905) (Decorated dragonet)
- Callionymus delicatulus J. L. B. Smith, 1963 (Delicate dragonet)
- Callionymus doryssus (D. S. Jordan & Fowler, 1903) (Japanese filamentous dragonet)
- Callionymus draconis Nakabo, 1977 (Japanese spiny dragonet)
- Callionymus enneactis Bleeker, 1879 (Mangrove dragonet)
- Callionymus erythraeus E. Ninni, 1934 (Small-head dragonet)
- Callionymus fasciatus Valenciennes, 1837 (Banded dragonet)
- Callionymus filamentosus Valenciennes, 1837 (Blotch-fin dragonet)
- Callionymus flavus R. Fricke, 1983 (Yellow ruddertail dragonet)
- Callionymus fluviatilis F. Day, 1876 (River dragonet)
- Callionymus formosanus R. Fricke, 1981 (Taiwanese deepwater dragonet)
- Callionymus futuna R. Fricke, 1998 (Futuna deepwater dragonet)
- Callionymus gardineri Regan, 1908 (Long-tail dragonet)
- Callionymus goodladi (Whitley, 1944) (Goodlad's dragonet)
- Callionymus grossi J. D. Ogilby, 1910 (Gross' dragonet)
- Callionymus guentheri R. Fricke, 1981 (Günther's deepwater dragonet)
- Callionymus hainanensis S. C. Li, 1966 (Hainan darter dragonet)
- Callionymus hildae R. Fricke, 1981 (Hilde's darter dragonet)
- Callionymus hindsii J. Richardson, 1844 (Hinds' dragonet)
- Callionymus ikedai (Nakabo, Senou & Aizawa, 1998) (Ryukyu ruddertail dragonet)
- Callionymus io R. Fricke, 1983 (Andaman Sea spiny dragonet)
- Callionymus izuensis R. Fricke & Zaiser, 1993 (Izu dragonet)
- Callionymus japonicus Houttuyn, 1782 (Japanese longtail dragonet)
- Callionymus kailolae R. Fricke, 2000 (Kailola's deepwater dragonet)
- Callionymus kanakorum R. Fricke, 2006 (Kanakorum dragonet)
- Callionymus keeleyi Fowler, 1941 (Keeley's dragonet)
- Callionymus koreanus (Nakabo, S. R. Jeon & S. C. Li, 1987) (Korean dragonet)
- Callionymus kotthausi R. Fricke, 1981 (Kotthaus’ deepwater dragonet)
- Callionymus leucobranchialis Fowler, 1941 (White-gill dragonet)
- Callionymus leucopoecilus R. Fricke & C. L. Lee, 1993 (Korean darter dragonet)
- Callionymus limiceps J. D. Ogilby, 1908 (Rough-headed dragonet)
- Callionymus lunatus Temminck & Schlegel, 1845 (Moon dragonet)
- Callionymus luridus R. Fricke, 1981 (Macclesfield longtail dragonet)
- Callionymus lyra Linnaeus, 1758 (Dragonet)
- Callionymus macclesfieldensis R. Fricke, 1983 (Macclesfield dragonet)
- Callionymus macdonaldi J. D. Ogilby, 1911 (Australian darter dragonet)
- Callionymus maculatus Rafinesque, 1810 (Spotted dragonet)
- Callionymus madangensis R. Fricke, 2014 (Madang dragonet)
- Callionymus margaretae Regan, 1905 (Margaret's dragonet)
- Callionymus marleyi Regan, 1919 (Sand dragonet)
- Callionymus marquesensis R. Fricke, 1989 (Marquesas ruddertail dragonet)
- Callionymus martinae R. Fricke, 1981 (Martina's dragonet)
- Callionymus mascarenus R. Fricke, 1983 (Mauritius dragonet)
- Callionymus megastomus R. Fricke, 1982 (Indian megamouth dragonet)
- Callionymus melanotopterus Bleeker, 1850 (Indonesian flag dragonet)
- Callionymus meridionalis Suwardji, 1965 (White-flag dragonet)
- Callionymus moretonensis C. R. Johnson, 1971 (Queensland dragonet)
- Callionymus mortenseni Suwardji, 1965 (Mortensen's darter dragonet)
- Callionymus muscatensis Regan, 1905 (Muscat dragonet)
- Callionymus neptunius (Seale, 1910) (Long-tail dragonet)
- Callionymus obscurus R. Fricke, 1989 (Obscure dragonet)
- Callionymus ochiaii R. Fricke, 1981 (Japanese lowfin deepwater dragonet)
- Callionymus octostigmatus R. Fricke, 1981 (Eight-spot dragonet)
- Callionymus ogilbyi R. Fricke, 2002 (Eastern Australian longtail dragonet)
- Callionymus omanensis R. Fricke, Jawad & Al-Mamry, 2014 (Oman dragonet)
- Callionymus oxycephalus R. Fricke, 1980 (Red Sea spiny dragonet)
- Callionymus persicus Regan, 1905 (Persian dragonet)
- Callionymus petersi R. Fricke, 2016 (Peters's dragonet)
- Callionymus planus Ochiai, 1955 (Japanese darter dragonet)
- Callionymus platycephalus R. Fricke, 1983 (Flat-head dragonet)
- Callionymus pleurostictus R. Fricke, 1982 (Blue-spotted ruddertail dragonet)
- Callionymus profundus R. Fricke & Golani, 2013
- Callionymus pusillus Delaroche, 1809 (Sail-fin dragonet)
- Callionymus regani Nakabo, 1979 (Regan's deepwater dragonet)
- Callionymus reticulatus Valenciennes, 1837 (Reticulated dragonet)
- Callionymus risso Lesueur, 1814 (Risso's dragonet)
- Callionymus rivatoni R. Fricke, 1993 (New Caledonian longtail dragonet)
- Callionymus russelli C. R. Johnson, 1976 (Russell's dragonet)
- Callionymus sagitta Pallas, 1770 (Arrow dragonet)
- Callionymus scaber McCulloch, 1926 (Lord Howe longtail dragonet)
- Callionymus scabriceps Fowler, 1941 (Jolo dragonet)
- Callionymus schaapii Bleeker, 1852 (Short-snout sand dragonet)
- Callionymus semeiophor R. Fricke, 1983 (Nusa Tenggara deepwater dragonet)
- Callionymus sereti R. Fricke, 1998 (Séret's dragonet)
- Callionymus simplicicornis Valenciennes, 1837 (Simple-spined dragonet)
- Callionymus sokonumeri Kamohara, 1936 (Japanese highfin deepwater dragonet)
- Callionymus sphinx R. Fricke & Heckele, 1984 (Sphinx dragonet)
- Callionymus stigmatopareius R. Fricke, 1981 (Mozambique dragonet)
- Callionymus sublaevis McCulloch, 1926 (Australian filamentous dragonet)
- Callionymus superbus R. Fricke, 1983 (Proud dragonet)
- Callionymus tenuis R. Fricke, 1981 (Tiny dragonet)
- Callionymus tethys R. Fricke, 1993 (Tethys dragonet)
- Callionymus umbrithorax Fowler, 1941 (Philippine darkthroat dragonet)
- Callionymus valenciennei Temminck & Schlegel, 1845 (Valenciennes’ dragonet)
- Callionymus whiteheadi R. Fricke, 1981 (Whitehead's deepwater dragonet)
- Callionymus zythros R. Fricke, 2000 (Wongat dragonet)

† means extinct

=== Fossil species ===
The following fossil species are also known, although almost all aside from C. macrocephalus are only known from isolated otoliths:

- †Callionymus lerenardi Nolf & Lapierre, 1979 [otolith] - Middle Eocene of France (Paris Basin)
- †Callionymus macrocephalus Gorjanović-Kramberger, 1882 - Middle Miocene of Croatia, Serbia & Bosnia, potentially North Caucasus, Russia
- †"Callionymus" pachyotus Gaemers, 1985 [otolith] - Early Oligocene of Belgium
- ?†Callionymus primus Weiler, 1943 [otolith] - Late Oligocene of Romania (possibly assignable to Protonymus)
- †Callionymus schermanni Schwarzhans, 1973 [otolith] - Early Oligocene of Germany
- †Callionymus vyali Carolin, Bajpai, Maurya & Schwarzhans, 2022 [otolith] - Burdigalian of Kerala, India (Quilon Formation)
