= Callionymus colini =

Scientific classification
- Domain: Eukaryota
- Kingdom: Animalia
- Phylum: Chordata
- Class: Actinopterygii
- Order: Callionymiformes
- Family: Callionymidae
- Genus: Callionymus
- Species: C. colini

Binomial name
- Callionymus colini R. Fricke, 1993

Species of fish

Callionymus colini, the Tiny New Guinea longtail dragonet, is a species of dragonet endemic to the Pacific Ocean waters around Papua New Guinea.

== Etymology ==
The specific name honours Dr Patrick L. Colin, of the University of Papua New Guinea's Motupore Island Research Station in Port Moresby, who collected the type specimen.
