= Callionymus futuna =

Scientific classification
- Domain: Eukaryota
- Kingdom: Animalia
- Phylum: Chordata
- Class: Actinopterygii
- Order: Callionymiformes
- Family: Callionymidae
- Genus: Callionymus
- Species: C. futuna

Binomial name
- Callionymus futuna R. Fricke, 1998

Species of fish

Callionymus futuna, the Futuna deepwater dragonet, is a species of dragonet known only from the vicinity of Futuna Island.
