= Callionymus io =

Scientific classification
- Domain: Eukaryota
- Kingdom: Animalia
- Phylum: Chordata
- Class: Actinopterygii
- Order: Callionymiformes
- Family: Callionymidae
- Genus: Callionymus
- Species: C. io

Binomial name
- Callionymus io R. Fricke, 1983

Species of fish

Callionymus io, the Andaman Sea spiny dragonet, is a species of dragonet endemic to the Indian Ocean waters off of Myanmar. This species grows to a length of 2.5 centimetres (0.98 in) SL.
