= Callionymus leucopoecilus =

Scientific classification
- Domain: Eukaryota
- Kingdom: Animalia
- Phylum: Chordata
- Class: Actinopterygii
- Order: Callionymiformes
- Family: Callionymidae
- Genus: Callionymus
- Species: C. leucopoecilus

Binomial name
- Callionymus leucopoecilus R. Fricke & C. L. Lee, 1993

Synonyms
- Repomucenus leucopoecilus (Fricke & Lee, 1993)

Species of fish

Callionymus leucopoecilus, the Korean darter dragonet, is a species of dragonet native to the Pacific waters around the Korean Peninsula. The males of this species grow to a length of 8.4 centimetres (3.3 in) SL while the females reach 7.9 centimetres (3.1 in) SL.
