= Callionymus martinae =

Scientific classification
- Domain: Eukaryota
- Kingdom: Animalia
- Phylum: Chordata
- Class: Actinopterygii
- Order: Callionymiformes
- Family: Callionymidae
- Genus: Callionymus
- Species: C. martinae

Binomial name
- Callionymus martinae R. Fricke, 1981

Synonyms
- Calliurichthys martinae (Fricke, 1981)

Species of fish

Callionymus martinae, Martina's dragonet, is a species of dragonet endemic to the Pacific waters around Taiwan where it occurs at depths of from 73 to 92 metres (240 to 302 ft). The specific name honours Miss Martina Wolf, of Braunschweig, for her "continued interest" in the author's, Ronald Fricke's, studies.
