= Callionymus zythros =

Scientific classification
- Kingdom: Animalia
- Phylum: Chordata
- Class: Actinopterygii
- Order: Syngnathiformes
- Family: Callionymidae
- Genus: Callionymus
- Species: C. zythros

Binomial name
- Callionymus zythros R. Fricke, 2000

Species of fish

Callionymus zythros, the Wongat dragonet, is a species of dragonet native to the Pacific waters around Papua New Guinea where it occurs at depths of from 20 to 27 metres (66 to 89 ft).
