= Callionymus flavus =

Scientific classification
- Domain: Eukaryota
- Kingdom: Animalia
- Phylum: Chordata
- Class: Actinopterygii
- Order: Callionymiformes
- Family: Callionymidae
- Genus: Callionymus
- Species: C. flavus

Binomial name
- Callionymus flavus R. Fricke, 1983

Species of fish

Callionymus flavus, the yellow ruddertail dragonet, is a species of dragonet endemic to the Red Sea.
