= Callionymus megastomus =

Scientific classification
- Kingdom: Animalia
- Phylum: Chordata
- Class: Actinopterygii
- Order: Syngnathiformes
- Family: Callionymidae
- Genus: Callionymus
- Species: C. megastomus

Binomial name
- Callionymus megastomus R. Fricke, 1982

Species of fish

Callionymus megastomus, the Indian megamouth dragonet, is a species of dragonet native to the Indian Ocean around India.
