= Callionymus sphinx =

Scientific classification
- Kingdom: Animalia
- Phylum: Chordata
- Class: Actinopterygii
- Order: Syngnathiformes
- Family: Callionymidae
- Genus: Callionymus
- Species: C. sphinx

Binomial name
- Callionymus sphinx R. Fricke & Heckele, 1984

Species of fish

Callionymus sphinx, the sphinx dragonet, is a species of dragonet known from the waters off of the Northern Territory, Australia. This species grows to a length of 5.1 centimetres (2.0 in) SL.
