= Callionymus rivatoni =

Scientific classification
- Kingdom: Animalia
- Phylum: Chordata
- Class: Actinopterygii
- Order: Syngnathiformes
- Family: Callionymidae
- Genus: Callionymus
- Species: C. rivatoni

Binomial name
- Callionymus rivatoni R. Fricke, 1993

Species of fish

Callionymus rivatoni, the New Caledonian longtail dragonet, is a species of dragonet native to the Pacific Ocean around New Caledonia. The specific name honours the French zoologist Jacques Rivaton.
