= Callionymus hildae =

Scientific classification
- Domain: Eukaryota
- Kingdom: Animalia
- Phylum: Chordata
- Class: Actinopterygii
- Order: Callionymiformes
- Family: Callionymidae
- Genus: Callionymus
- Species: C. hildae

Binomial name
- Callionymus hildae R. Fricke, 1981

Species of fish

Callionymus hildae, Hilde's darter dragonet, is a species of dragonet endemic to the Pacific waters around the Philippines. The specific name honours Miss Hildegard Handermann, of Braunschweig, for her "continued interest" in the author's, Ronald Fricke's, studies.
