= Callionymus kotthausi =

Scientific classification
- Domain: Eukaryota
- Kingdom: Animalia
- Phylum: Chordata
- Class: Actinopterygii
- Order: Callionymiformes
- Family: Callionymidae
- Genus: Callionymus
- Species: C. kotthausi

Binomial name
- Callionymus kotthausi R. Fricke, 1981

Species of fish

Callionymus kotthausi, Kotthaus’ deepwater dragonet, is a species of dragonet found only in the Indian Ocean off India where it occurs at depths of from 138 to 211 metres (453 to 692 ft). The specific name honours the Swiss ichthyologist Adolf Kotthaus.
