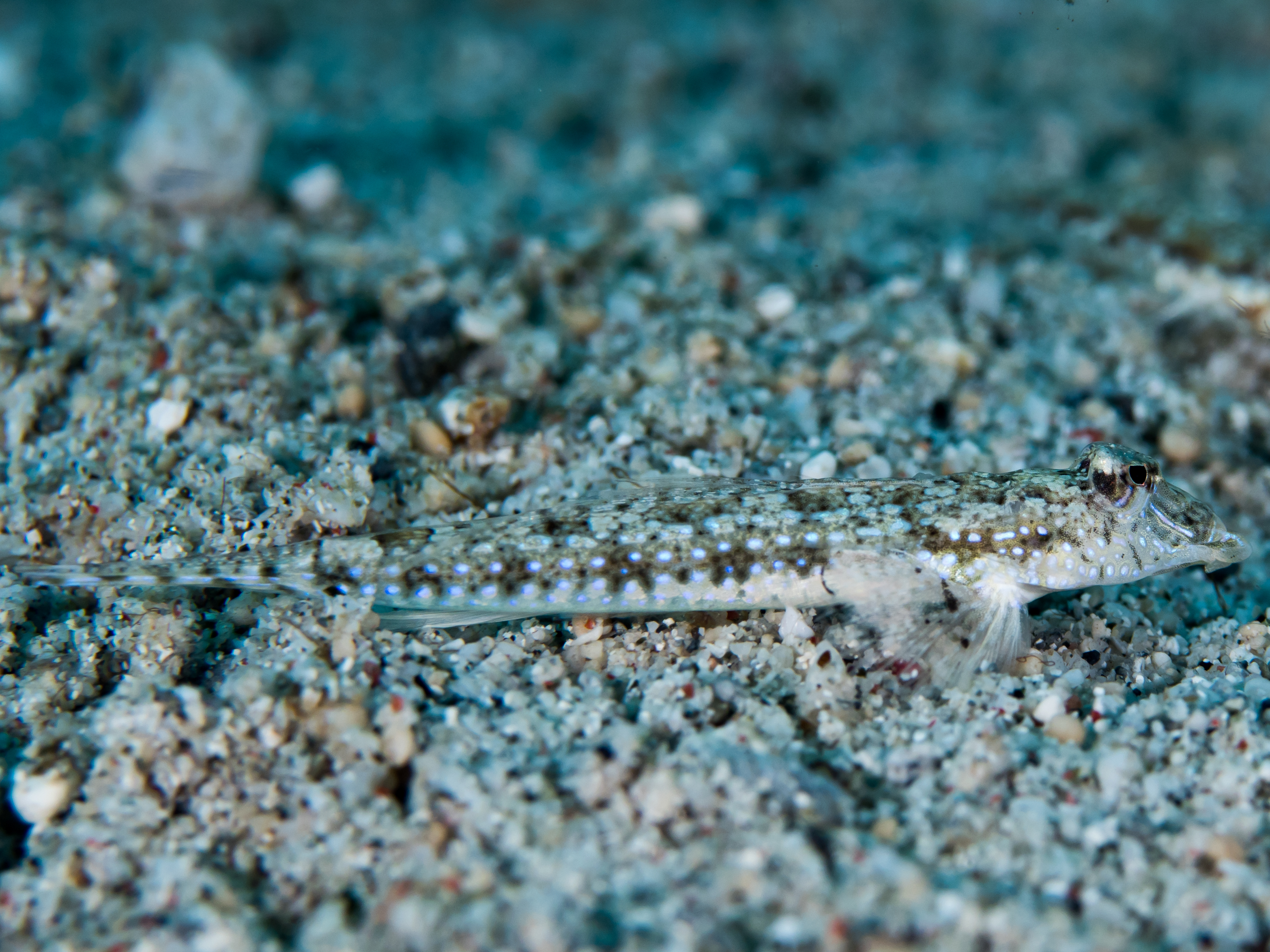
- Callionymus pleurostictus

Scientific classification
- Kingdom: Animalia
- Phylum: Chordata
- Class: Actinopterygii
- Order: Syngnathiformes
- Family: Callionymidae
- Genus: Callionymus
- Species: C. pleurostictus

Binomial name
- Callionymus pleurostictus R. Fricke, 1982

= Callionymus pleurostictus =

Species of fish

Callionymus pleurostictus, the blue-spotted ruddertail dragonet, is a species of dragonet native to the Pacific Ocean where it is found from the Ryukyus south to Australia. This species occurs at depths of from 1 to 20 metres (3.3 to 65.6 ft). This species grows to a length of 2.3 centimetres (0.91 in) SL.
