= Callionymus platycephalus =

Conservation status
- Data Deficient (IUCN 3.1)

Scientific classification
- Kingdom: Animalia
- Phylum: Chordata
- Class: Actinopterygii
- Order: Syngnathiformes
- Family: Callionymidae
- Genus: Callionymus
- Species: C. platycephalus

Binomial name
- Callionymus platycephalus R. Fricke, 1983

Species of fish

Callionymus platycephalus, the flathead dragonet, is a species of dragonet endemic to the Pacific waters around the Philippines where it occurs from the surface to 48 metres (157 ft). This species grows to a length of 8.6 centimetres (3.4 in) SL.
