= Callionymus semeiophor =

Scientific classification
- Kingdom: Animalia
- Phylum: Chordata
- Class: Actinopterygii
- Order: Syngnathiformes
- Family: Callionymidae
- Genus: Callionymus
- Species: C. semeiophor

Binomial name
- Callionymus semeiophor R. Fricke, 1983

Species of fish

Callionymus semeiophor, the Nusa Tenggara deepwater dragonet, is a species of dragonet native to the Pacific Ocean around Indonesia. This species grows to a length of 11.3 centimetres (4.4 in) SL.
