= Callionymus brevianalis =

Scientific classification
- Kingdom: Animalia
- Phylum: Chordata
- Class: Actinopterygii
- Order: Syngnathiformes
- Family: Callionymidae
- Genus: Callionymus
- Species: C. brevianalis

Binomial name
- Callionymus brevianalis Fricke, 1983

Synonyms
- Pseudocalliurichthys brevianalis (Fricke, 1983)

Species of fish

Callionymus brevianalis, the small ruddertail dragonet, is a species of dragonet native to the coastal waters of Indonesia where it can be found at depths of from 0 to 6 metres (0 to 20 ft). This species grows to a length of 2.1 centimetres (0.83 in) standard length.
