= Callionymus tenuis =

Scientific classification
- Kingdom: Animalia
- Phylum: Chordata
- Class: Actinopterygii
- Order: Syngnathiformes
- Family: Callionymidae
- Genus: Callionymus
- Species: C. tenuis

Binomial name
- Callionymus tenuis R. Fricke, 1981

Species of fish

Callionymus tenuis, also known as the tiny dragonet, is a small species of fish found in the Indian Ocean around the Maldives. It belongs to the Callionymidae family, which consists of marine fishes commonly known as dragonets. This particular species is known for its small size, with an average length of just 1.8 centimetres (0.71 in) when measured from the tip of its snout to the end of its body.
