= Callionymus luridus =

Scientific classification
- Domain: Eukaryota
- Kingdom: Animalia
- Phylum: Chordata
- Class: Actinopterygii
- Order: Callionymiformes
- Family: Callionymidae
- Genus: Callionymus
- Species: C. luridus

Binomial name
- Callionymus luridus R. Fricke, 1981

Species of fish

Callionymus luridus, the Macclesfield longtail dragonet, is a species of dragonet found on the Macclesfield Bank in the South China Sea.
