= Callionymus macclesfieldensis =

Conservation status
- Data Deficient (IUCN 3.1)

Scientific classification
- Kingdom: Animalia
- Phylum: Chordata
- Class: Actinopterygii
- Order: Syngnathiformes
- Family: Callionymidae
- Genus: Callionymus
- Species: C. macclesfieldensis

Binomial name
- Callionymus macclesfieldensis R. Fricke, 1983

Species of fish

Callionymus macclesfieldensis, the Macclesfield dragonet, is a species of dragonet found only on the Macclesfield Bank in the South China Sea where it is found at depths of from 77 to 82 metres (253 to 269 ft). This species grows to a length of 5 centimetres (2.0 in) SL.
