= Callionymus belcheri =

Scientific classification
- Kingdom: Animalia
- Phylum: Chordata
- Class: Actinopterygii
- Order: Syngnathiformes
- Family: Callionymidae
- Genus: Callionymus
- Species: C. belcheri

Binomial name
- Callionymus belcheri J. Richardson, 1844

Synonyms
- Calliurichthys belcheri (Richardson, 1844); Calliurichthys recurvispinnis Li, 1966; Callionymus recurvispinnis (Li, 1966); Repomucenus belcheri (Richardson 1844)

Species of fish

Callionymus belcheri, Belcher's dragonet or the flathead dragonet, is a species of dragonet native to the Pacific Ocean waters off of Australia and Papua New Guinea where it occurs at depths of from 18 to 36 metres (59 to 118 ft).

== Description ==
Callionymus belcheri has a yellowish to brown head and body with many small white spots on its back. The flanks are marked with white blotches which have dark brown margins. The underside is white. There are two dorsal fins, the first dorsal fin is brownish in colour, with a distal margin that is often blackish and which in males has white spots. The second dorsal fin is marked wither with light and dark streaks or with small white spots. The anal fin of males has a dark streak and in females is colourless or has dark spots on ots distal portion. The lower two-thirds of the caudal fin has brown spots. The preopercular spine has a concave ventral margin. There are a total of 4 spines in the dorsal fins and 9 soft rays with 8 soft rays in the anal fin. This species grows to a length of 10 centimetres (3.9 in) SL.

== Distribution ==
Callionymus belcheri occurs in Queensland from Moreton Bay north to northern New Guinea and into the Gulf of Carpentaria, and westwards to northern Western Australia.

== Habitat and biology ==
Callionymus belcheri is a marine, demersal fish which occurs at depth ranges of 18 to 36 metres (59 to 118 ft). It has a varied diet which is mainly made up of invertebrates including polychaete worms, gastropods, bivalves, small crustaceans and scaphopods. Larger fish also ate echinoderms and Caperllids. They appear to feed mainly in the late afternoon between 16:00 and 18:00, spending the rest of the day buried in sand or mud. This species spawns once a year in the southern Autumn, from March to May. They mature at lengths of 70–80 millimetres (2.8–3.1 in) in both sexes and females become less fertile towards the end of their lives.

== Taxonomy and naming ==
The subspecies Callionymus belcheri recurvispinnis, as named by Fricke. is regarded as a valid species by some authorities and is treated as such in FishBase, the authority used here for species of fish.

The specific name honours the British Naval officer and explorer Admiral Sir Edward Belcher (1799-1877) who collected many specimens during his career and was a collector of shells.
