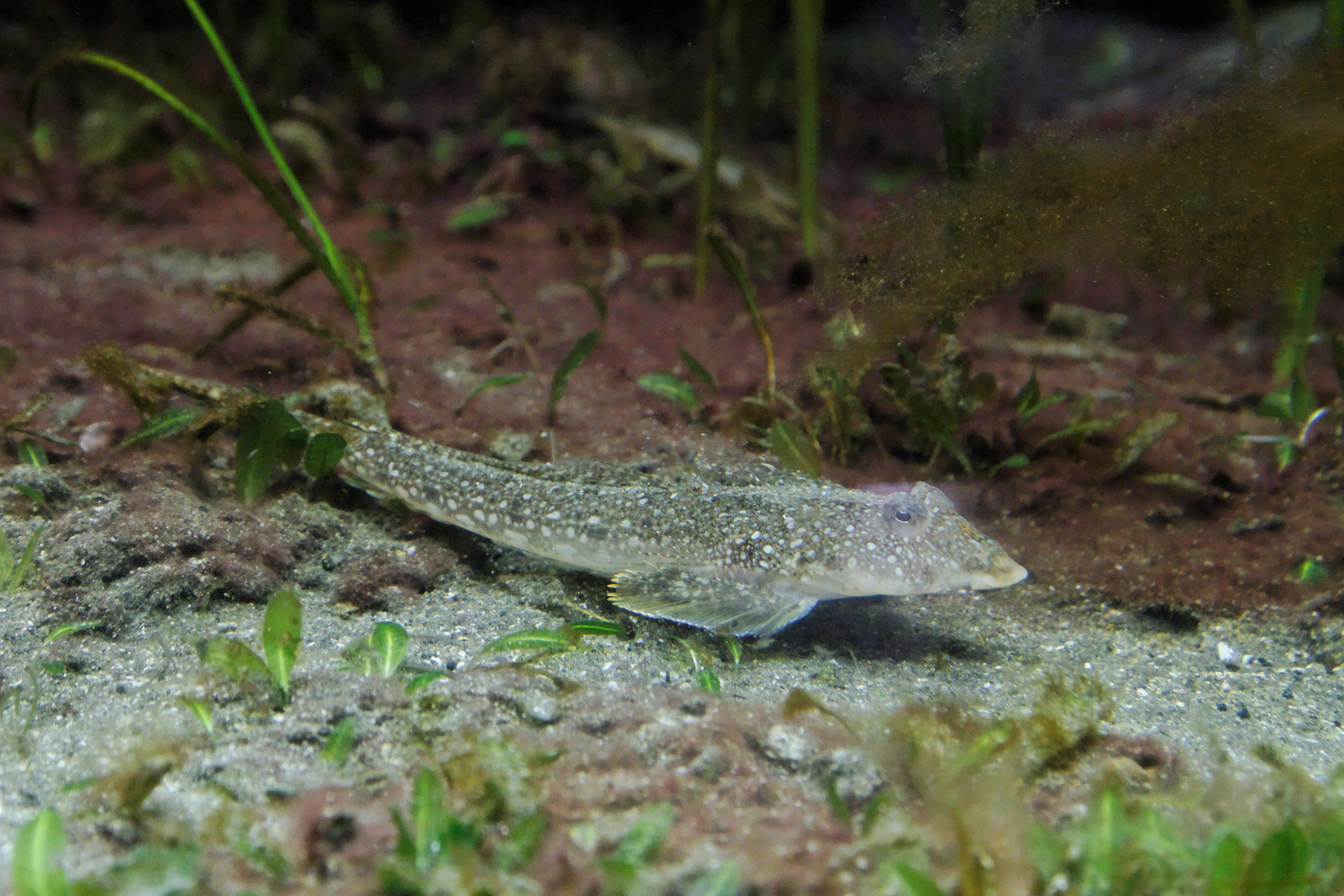

Scientific classification
- Kingdom: Animalia
- Phylum: Chordata
- Class: Actinopterygii
- Order: Syngnathiformes
- Family: Callionymidae
- Genus: Callionymus
- Species: C. curvicornis

Binomial name
- Callionymus curvicornis Valenciennes, 1837

Synonyms
- Repomucenus curvicornis (Valenciennes, 1837); Callionymus punctatus Richardson, 1837; Callionymus richardsonii Bleeker, 1854; Repomucenus richardsonii (Bleeker, 1854)

= Callionymus curvicornis =

Species of fish

Callionymus curvicornis, the horn dragonet, is a species of dragonet native to the northwestern Pacific Ocean. This species grows to a length of 11.1 centimetres (4.4 in) SL.
