= Callionymus russelli =

Scientific classification
- Kingdom: Animalia
- Phylum: Chordata
- Class: Actinopterygii
- Order: Syngnathiformes
- Family: Callionymidae
- Genus: Callionymus
- Species: C. russelli

Binomial name
- Callionymus russelli C. R. Johnson, 1976

Species of fish

Callionymus russelli, Russell’s dragonet, is a species of dragonet native to the Pacific waters off of Papua New Guinea.

== Etymology ==
The specific name honours Clifford R. Johnson's father, Russell Johnson.
