= Callionymus cooperi =

Scientific classification
- Kingdom: Animalia
- Phylum: Chordata
- Class: Actinopterygii
- Order: Syngnathiformes
- Family: Callionymidae
- Genus: Callionymus
- Species: C. cooperi

Binomial name
- Callionymus cooperi Regan, 1908

Species of fish

Callionymus cooperi, Cooper's dragonet, is a species of dragonet found only around the Maldives where it occurs at depths of from 73 to 81 metres (240 to 266 ft). The specific name honours the U.S. physician, ichthyologist, ornithologist and malacologist James Graham Cooper (1830–1902).
