= Hinds' dragonet =

Scientific classification
- Kingdom: Animalia
- Phylum: Chordata
- Class: Actinopterygii
- Order: Syngnathiformes
- Family: Callionymidae
- Genus: Callionymus
- Species: C. hindsii

Binomial name
- Callionymus hindsii J. Richardson, 1844

Synonyms
- Calliurichthys hindsii (Richardson, 1844)

Species of fish

Callionymus hindsii, Hinds' dragonet, is a species of dragonet native to the Indian Ocean and the western Pacific Ocean where it occurs at depths down to 40 metres (130 ft). This species grows to a length of 9 centimetres (3.5 in) TL. The specific name is thought to most likely to be in honour of the British naval surgeon, naturalist and writer Richard Brinsley Hinds (1811-1846).
