= Big-head dragonet =

Scientific classification
- Kingdom: Animalia
- Phylum: Chordata
- Class: Actinopterygii
- Order: Syngnathiformes
- Family: Callionymidae
- Genus: Callionymus
- Species: C. annulatus

Binomial name
- Callionymus annulatus M. C. W. Weber, 1913

Synonyms
- Repomucenus annulatus (Weber, 1913); Callionymus bali Suwardji, 1965

Species of fish

The big-head dragonet (Callionymus annulatus) is a species of dragonet native to the Pacific waters off of southern Indonesia where it occurs at depths of from 8 to 26 metres (26 to 85 ft). This species grows to a length of 6.5 centimetres (2.6 in) TL.
