= Callionymus melanotopterus =

Scientific classification
- Kingdom: Animalia
- Phylum: Chordata
- Class: Actinopterygii
- Order: Syngnathiformes
- Family: Callionymidae
- Genus: Callionymus
- Species: C. melanotopterus

Binomial name
- Callionymus melanotopterus Bleeker, 1851

Species of fish

Callionymus melanotopterus, the Indonesian flag dragonet, is a species of dragonet native to the Pacific waters of Indonesia where it inhabits estuaries.
