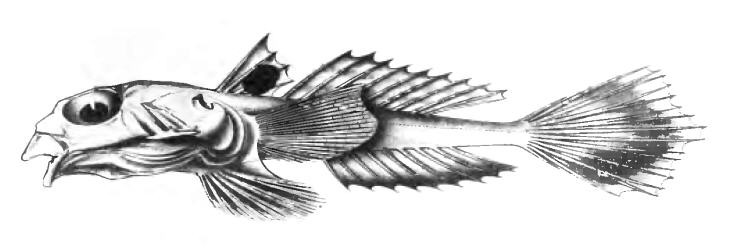

Scientific classification
- Kingdom: Animalia
- Phylum: Chordata
- Class: Actinopterygii
- Order: Syngnathiformes
- Family: Callionymidae
- Genus: Callionymus
- Species: C. carebares

Binomial name
- Callionymus carebares Alcock, 1890

= Indian deepwater dragonet =

Species of fish

The Indian deepwater dragonet (Callionymus carebares) is a species of dragonet native to the western Indian Ocean where it occurs at depths of from 135 to 330 metres (443 to 1,083 ft). This species grows to a length of 18 centimetres (7.1 in) TL.
