= Callionymus meridionalis =

Scientific classification
- Domain: Eukaryota
- Kingdom: Animalia
- Phylum: Chordata
- Class: Actinopterygii
- Order: Callionymiformes
- Family: Callionymidae
- Genus: Callionymus
- Species: C. meridionalis

Binomial name
- Callionymus meridionalis Suwardji, 1965

Species of fish

Callionymus meridionalis, the whiteflag dragonet, is a species of dragonet native to the western Pacific Ocean where it occurs down to depths of 70 metres (230 ft). This species grows to a length of 10.8 centimetres (4.3 in) SL.
