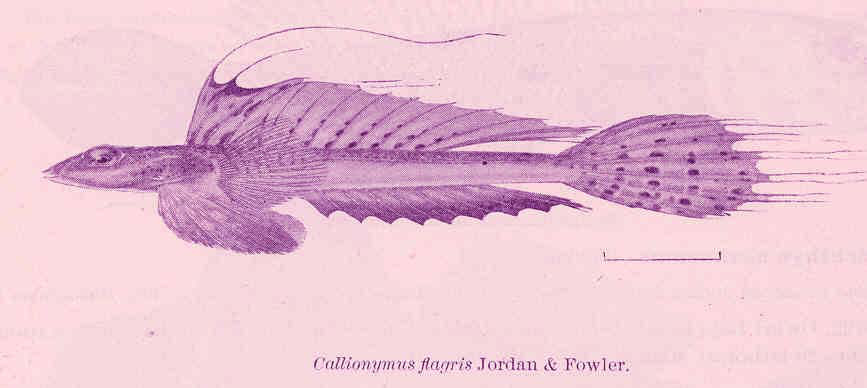

Scientific classification
- Kingdom: Animalia
- Phylum: Chordata
- Class: Actinopterygii
- Division: Teleostei
- Order: Syngnathiformes
- Family: Callionymidae
- Genus: Callionymus
- Species: C. valenciennei

Binomial name
- Callionymus valenciennei Temminck & Schlegel, 1845

Synonyms
- Repomucenus valenciennei (Temminck & Schlegel, 1845); Callionymus flagris Jordan & Fowler, 1903

= Callionymus valenciennei =

Species of fish

Callionymus valenciennei, Valenciennes’ dragonet, is a species of dragonet native to the Pacific waters around Japan and the Korean Peninsula where it occurs at depths of from 20 to 50 metres (66 to 164 ft). This species grows to a length of 10 centimetres (3.9 in) SL. The specific name and the vernacular name honour the French zoologist Achille Valenciennes (1794-1865).
