= Callionymus mortenseni =

Scientific classification
- Kingdom: Animalia
- Phylum: Chordata
- Class: Actinopterygii
- Order: Syngnathiformes
- Family: Callionymidae
- Genus: Callionymus
- Species: C. mortenseni

Binomial name
- Callionymus mortenseni Suwardji, 1965

Species of fish

Callionymus mortenseni, Mortensen's darter dragonet, is a species of dragonet native to the waters around Indonesia where it occurs at depths of around 290 metres (950 ft). The specific name honours Ole Theodor Jensen Mortensen (1868–1952), a Danish professor of zoology.
