= Amboyna =

Amboyna or amboina may refer to:

- Amboyna (play), a play by John Dryden
- Amboyna massacre, in 1623 in Indonesia
- Amboina box turtle (Cuora amboinensis), of Asia
- Amboina king parrot (Alisterus amboinensis), of Indonesia
- Amboyna (genus), a moth genus
- Amboyna burl of Pterocarpus trees
- Amboyna Cay, an island of the Spratly Islands
- Ambon Island, sometimes named Amboyna, part of the Maluku Islands of Indonesia
- Ambon, Maluku, a city on Ambon Island
- Amboina cone shell (ja:アンボイナガイ), Japanese common name of Conus geographus (geography cone)

== See also ==
- Amboine, a tree, Pterocarpus indicus
- Callionymus amboina, a Pacific fish
