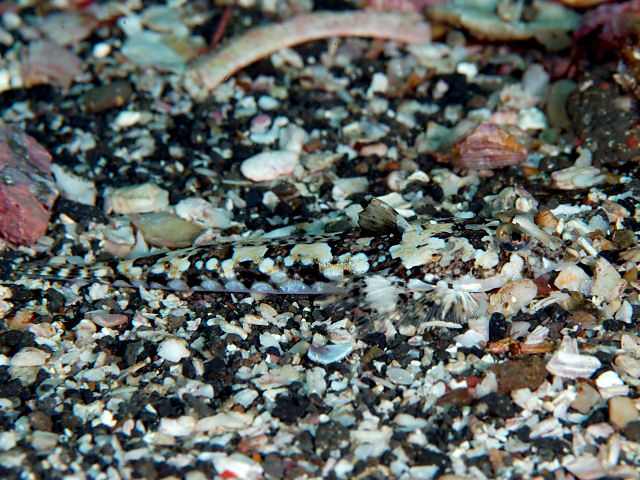

Scientific classification
- Kingdom: Animalia
- Phylum: Chordata
- Class: Actinopterygii
- Order: Syngnathiformes
- Family: Callionymidae
- Genus: Callionymus
- Species: C. beniteguri

Binomial name
- Callionymus beniteguri Jordan & Snyder, 1900

Synonyms
- Repomucenus beniteguri (Jordan & Snyder, 1900); Callionymus kanekonis Tanaka, 1917

= Callionymus beniteguri =

Species of fish

Callionymus beniteguri, the white-spotted dragonet, is a species of dragonet native to the water around Japan and the East China Sea. This species grows to a length of 16 centimetres (6.3 in) SL. This species is of importance to local commercial fisheries.
