= Callionymus scabriceps =

Scientific classification
- Kingdom: Animalia
- Phylum: Chordata
- Class: Actinopterygii
- Order: Syngnathiformes
- Family: Callionymidae
- Genus: Callionymus
- Species: C. scabriceps

Binomial name
- Callionymus scabriceps Fowler, 1941

Synonyms
- Calliurichthys scabriceps (Fowler, 1941)

Species of fish

Callionymus scabriceps, the Jolo dragonet, is a species of dragonet found in the Pacific waters of the Philippines and possibly also from Taiwan. This species grows to a length of 8 centimetres (3.1 in) SL.
