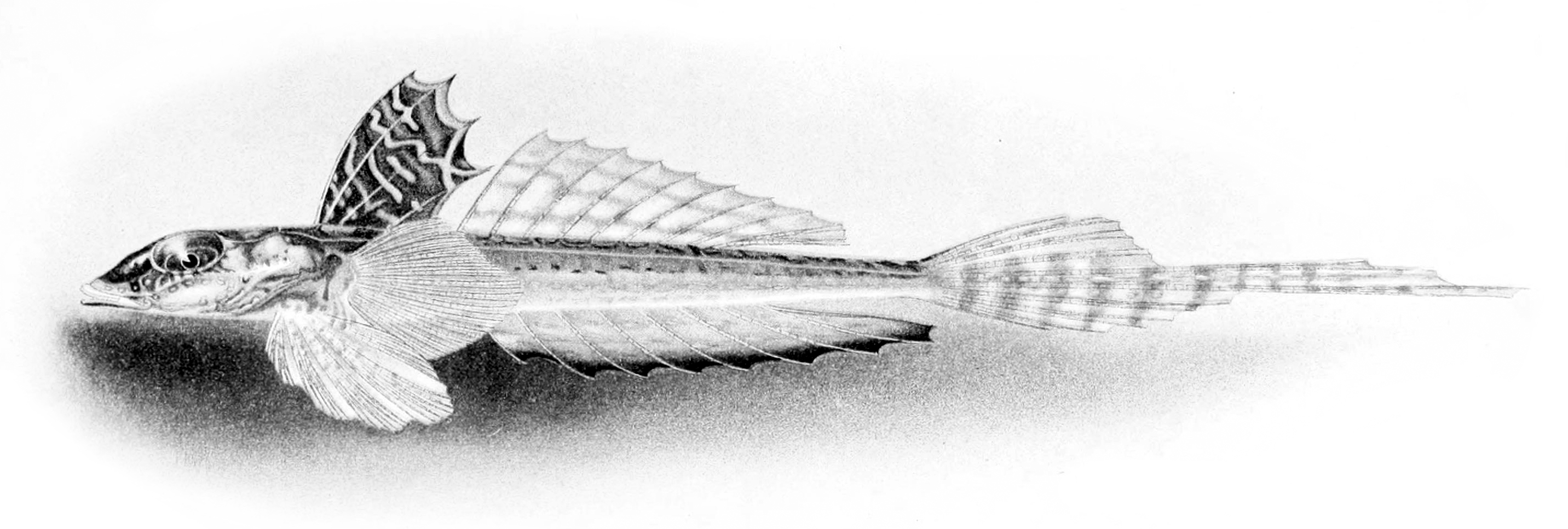

Scientific classification
- Domain: Eukaryota
- Kingdom: Animalia
- Phylum: Chordata
- Class: Actinopterygii
- Order: Callionymiformes
- Family: Callionymidae
- Genus: Callionymus
- Species: C. caeruleonotatus

Binomial name
- Callionymus caeruleonotatus C. H. Gilbert, 1905

= Bluespotted dragonet =

Species of fish

The bluespotted dragonet (Callionymus caeruleonotatus) is a species of dragonet endemic to the waters around the Hawaiian Islands where it occurs at depths of from 42 to 325 metres (138 to 1,066 ft). This species grows to a length of 5.4 centimetres (2.1 in) SL.
