= Callionymus leucobranchialis =

Conservation status
- Data Deficient (IUCN 3.1)

Scientific classification
- Kingdom: Animalia
- Phylum: Chordata
- Class: Actinopterygii
- Order: Syngnathiformes
- Family: Callionymidae
- Genus: Callionymus
- Species: C. leucobranchialis

Binomial name
- Callionymus leucobranchialis Fowler, 1941

Synonyms
- Repomucenus leucobranchialis (Fowler, 1941)

Species of fish

Callionymus leucobranchialis, the Whitegill dragonet, is a species of dragonet found in the Pacific waters around the Philippines at a depth of about 82 metres (269 ft).
