= Long-tail dragonet =

Scientific classification
- Kingdom: Animalia
- Phylum: Chordata
- Class: Actinopterygii
- Order: Syngnathiformes
- Family: Callionymidae
- Genus: Callionymus
- Species: C. neptunius

Binomial name
- Callionymus neptunius (Seale, 1910)

Synonyms
- Calliurichthys neptunius Seale, 1910

Species of fish

The long-tail dragonet (Callionymus neptunius) is a species of dragonet native to the Pacific waters around Papua New Guinea, Indonesia and the Philippines where it occurs at depths of from 3 to 6 metres (9.8 to 19.7 ft). Males of this species grows to a length of 13 centimetres (5.1 in) TL while the females are smaller.
