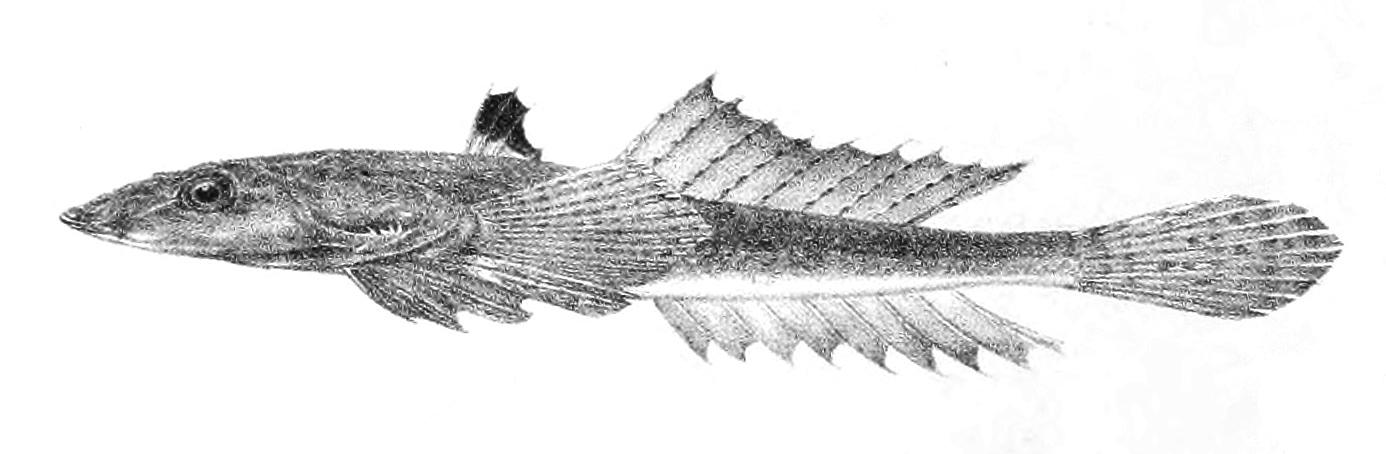

Conservation status
- Least Concern (IUCN 3.1)

Scientific classification
- Kingdom: Animalia
- Phylum: Chordata
- Class: Actinopterygii
- Division: Teleostei
- Order: Syngnathiformes
- Family: Callionymidae
- Genus: Callionymus
- Species: C. sagitta

Binomial name
- Callionymus sagitta Pallas, 1770

Synonyms
- Repomucenus sagitta (Pallas, 1770)

= Arrow dragonet =

Species of fish

The arrow dragonet (Callionymus sagitta), also known as the arrow-headed darter dragonet, is a species of dragonet widespread in the Indo-West Pacific from Arabian Peninsula to the Philippines. Occurs in the Mekong delta of Viet Nam and probably also in Cambodia. This species grows to a length of 11 centimetres (4.3 in) TL. The arrow dragonet is a demersal species, which occurs on sandy substrates along coastlines, in estuaries, and in the lower courses of rivers where it feeds on worms, zooplankton and phytoplankton.
