= Simple-spined dragonet =

Scientific classification
- Kingdom: Animalia
- Phylum: Chordata
- Class: Actinopterygii
- Order: Syngnathiformes
- Family: Callionymidae
- Genus: Callionymus
- Species: C. simplicicornis

Binomial name
- Callionymus simplicicornis Valenciennes, 1837

Synonyms
- Pseudocalliurichthys simplicicornis (Valenciennes, 1837); Calliurichthys xanthosemeion Fowler, 1925; Callionymus xanthosemeion (Fowler, 1925)

Species of fish

Callionymus simplicicornis, the simple-spined dragonet, is a species of dragonet native to the tropical Pacific Ocean where it is known at depths of around 40 metres (130 ft). This species grows to a length of 5 centimetres (2.0 in) TL.
