= Callionymus bentuviai =

Scientific classification
- Domain: Eukaryota
- Kingdom: Animalia
- Phylum: Chordata
- Class: Actinopterygii
- Order: Callionymiformes
- Family: Callionymidae
- Genus: Callionymus
- Species: C. bentuviai

Binomial name
- Callionymus bentuviai Fricke, 1981

Species of fish

Callionymus bentuviai, Ben-Tuvia's deepwater dragonet, is a species of dragonet endemic to the Red Sea. This species grows to a length of 6.3 centimetres (2.5 in) SL.
