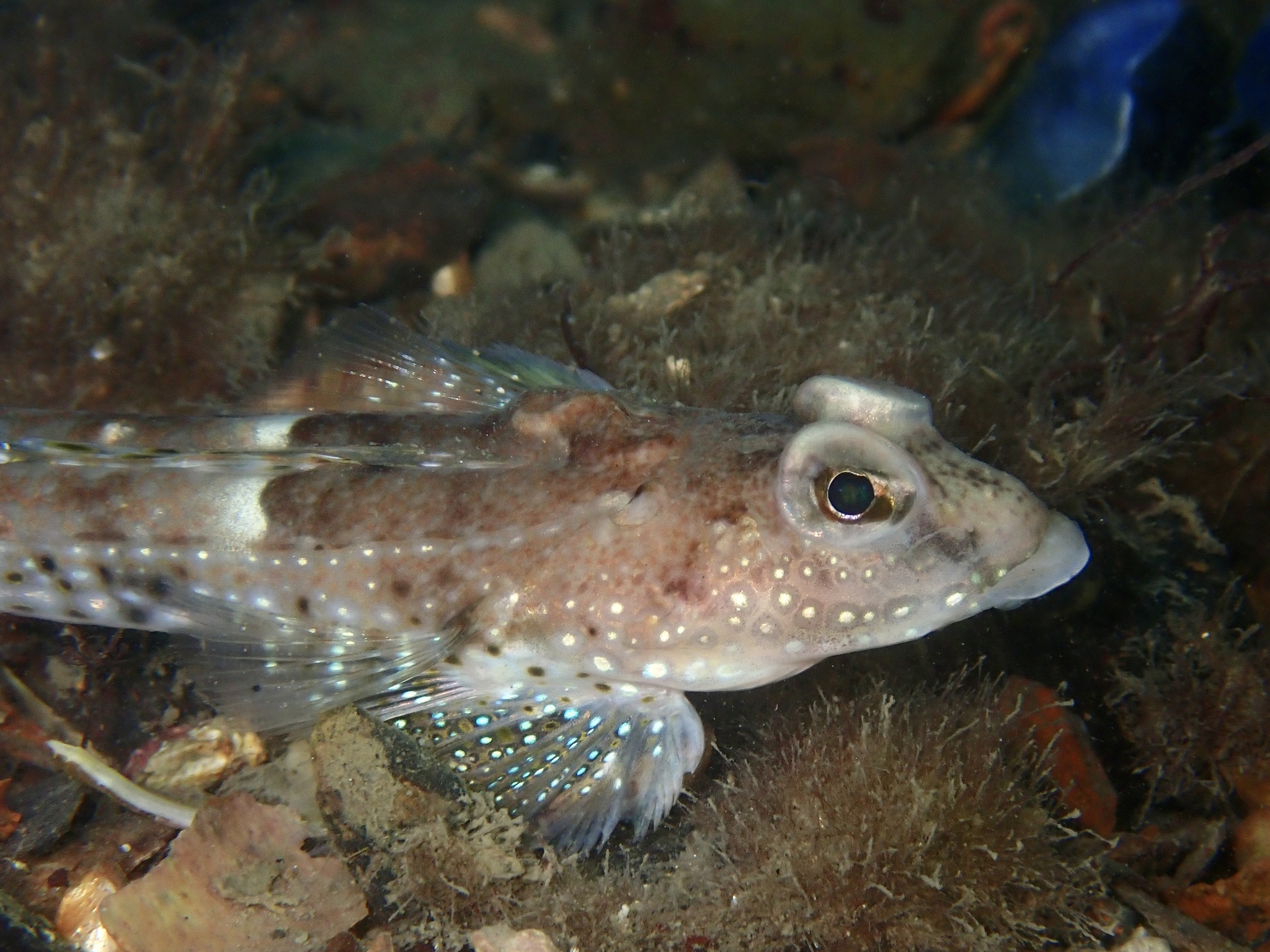

Conservation status
- Least Concern (IUCN 3.1)

Scientific classification
- Kingdom: Animalia
- Phylum: Chordata
- Class: Actinopterygii
- Order: Syngnathiformes
- Family: Callionymidae
- Genus: Callionymus
- Species: C. maculatus

Binomial name
- Callionymus maculatus Rafinesque, 1810

Synonyms
- Callionymus cithara Valenciennes, 1837

= Spotted dragonet =

Species of fish

The spotted dragonet (Callionymus maculatus) is a species of dragonet native to the eastern Atlantic Ocean and the Mediterranean Sea where it occurs at depths of from 45 to 650 metres (148 to 2,133 ft). This species is important to local peoples engaged in subsistence fishing.

== Description ==
The spotted dragonet is similar in shape to the common dragonet (Callionymus lyra) but it is smaller, growing to a total length of 16 centimetres (6.3 in) in males and 13 centimetres (5.1 in) in females. It has a broad, flattened head and body which is flat ventrally and convex dorsally and has a round cross-section posteriorly. The large eyes are situated quite close to each other on the top of the head which has a quite large, protractile mouth. The snout is a little shorter than the diamerter of the eye, being markedly shorter than that of the common dragonet. The preoperculum is hooked and has four spines, on pointing forwards and the remaining three point backwards. There are two high dorsal fins, taller in males than in females, and the first dorsal fin in males is a little higher than the second dorsal fin. The first dorsal fin has four rays and the second has 9–10 rays. The anal fin is similar in size to the second dorsal fin and it has a long tail. The pectoral fin are laterally situated and the pelvic fins are fan-shaped with a broad base. Females and immature males are yellowish-brown in colour with a double row of obvious brown spots on the flanks interspersed with smaller blue spots. Along the back there are four brown saddle shaped blotches. The mature males are similar but differ in having dorsal fin with four horizontal rows of conspicuous dark spots and smaller blue spots, females having two.

== Distribution ==
The spotted dragonet is found in the eastern North Atlantic from southern and western Iceland and Norway south to Senegal and it also occurs in the Mediterranean Sea, including the Adriatic and Aegean but it is absent from the Black Sea. In the Atlantic its range includes the Canary Islands.

== Habitat and biology ==
The spotted dragonet is a benthic fish which lives on sand substrates. Like other species of the family Callionymidae, this species spawns in pairs and has eggs, larvae, and postlarvae which are pelagic. In a study conducted off the coast of Scotland, the spawning season of the spotted dragonet was ascertained to extend from April to September, the females reached maturity faster than males and are serial spawners, and males may reach first maturity at different ages. The rays of the dorsal, anal and caudal fins grow at equal rates in females but grow at different rates in males after maturity has been reached. This species feeds mainly on polychaetes and amphipods, but bivalves, shrimps and brittle stars are also frequent components of its diet. Smaller specimens take more amphipods and fewer polychaetes than the larger individuals.

== Human usage ==
The spotted dragonet is taken as bycatch but is normally discarded in the beach seine fishery on the central coast of Portugal. Dragonets are sometimes taken as bycatch in bottom trawls and marketed locally and some species are commercially used in the aquarium trade.
