= River dragonet =

Scientific classification
- Kingdom: Animalia
- Phylum: Chordata
- Class: Actinopterygii
- Order: Syngnathiformes
- Family: Callionymidae
- Genus: Callionymus
- Species: C. fluviatilis

Binomial name
- Callionymus fluviatilis Day, 1876

Synonyms
- Repomucenus fluviatilis (Day, 1876)

Species of fish

The River dragonet (Callionymus fluviatilis) is a species of dragonet native to southern and southeastern Asia where it is found in the lower portions of rivers to the ocean. It is of minor importance to local commercial fisheries. This species grows to a length of 7 centimetres (2.8 in) TL.
