= Short-snout sand-dragonet =

Scientific classification
- Kingdom: Animalia
- Phylum: Chordata
- Class: Actinopterygii
- Order: Syngnathiformes
- Family: Callionymidae
- Genus: Callionymus
- Species: C. schaapii

Binomial name
- Callionymus schaapii Bleeker, 1852

Synonyms
- Repomucenus schaapii (Bleeker, 1852)

Species of fish

The short-snout sand-dragonet (Callionymus schaapii) is a species of dragonet native to the eastern Indian Ocean and the western Pacific Ocean where it is found at a depth of around 8 metres (26 ft). It prefers muddy or sandy substrates, preferring areas near river mouths or estuaries. This species grows to a length of 6.5 centimetres (2.6 in) TL. The specific name honours Dirk François Schaap, a Dutch colonial administrator in the Dutch East Indies who lived on Bangka Island, Sumatra, who found this species.
