= Rough-headed dragonet =

Scientific classification
- Kingdom: Animalia
- Phylum: Chordata
- Class: Actinopterygii
- Order: Syngnathiformes
- Family: Callionymidae
- Genus: Callionymus
- Species: C. limiceps

Binomial name
- Callionymus limiceps J. D. Ogilby, 1908

Synonyms
- Repomucenus limiceps (Ogilby, 1908)

Species of fish

The rough-headed dragonet (Callionymus limiceps) is a species of dragonet native to the waters off northern Australia. This species grows to a length of 25 centimetres (9.8 in) TL.
