= Callionymus planus =

Scientific classification
- Domain: Eukaryota
- Kingdom: Animalia
- Phylum: Chordata
- Class: Actinopterygii
- Order: Callionymiformes
- Family: Callionymidae
- Genus: Callionymus
- Species: C. planus

Binomial name
- Callionymus planus Ochiai, 1955

Synonyms
- Repomucenus planus (Ochiai, 1955)

Species of fish

Callionymus planus, the Japanese darter dragonet, is a species of dragonet native to the shallow Pacific waters off of southern Japan and Taiwan. This species grows to a length of 10 centimetres (3.9 in) SL.
