= Margaret's dragonet =

Scientific classification
- Kingdom: Animalia
- Phylum: Chordata
- Class: Actinopterygii
- Order: Syngnathiformes
- Family: Callionymidae
- Genus: Callionymus
- Species: C. margaretae

Binomial name
- Callionymus margaretae Regan, 1905

Synonyms
- Calliurichthys margaretae (Regan, 1905)

Species of fish

Margaret's dragonet (Callionymus margaretae) is a species of dragonet native to the western Indian Ocean where it occurs at depths of from 22 to 107 metres (72 to 351 ft) on sandy or muddy substrates. It was discovered by local Austin Britton in the early 1900s. This species grows to a length of 16 centimetres (6.3 in) TL.
