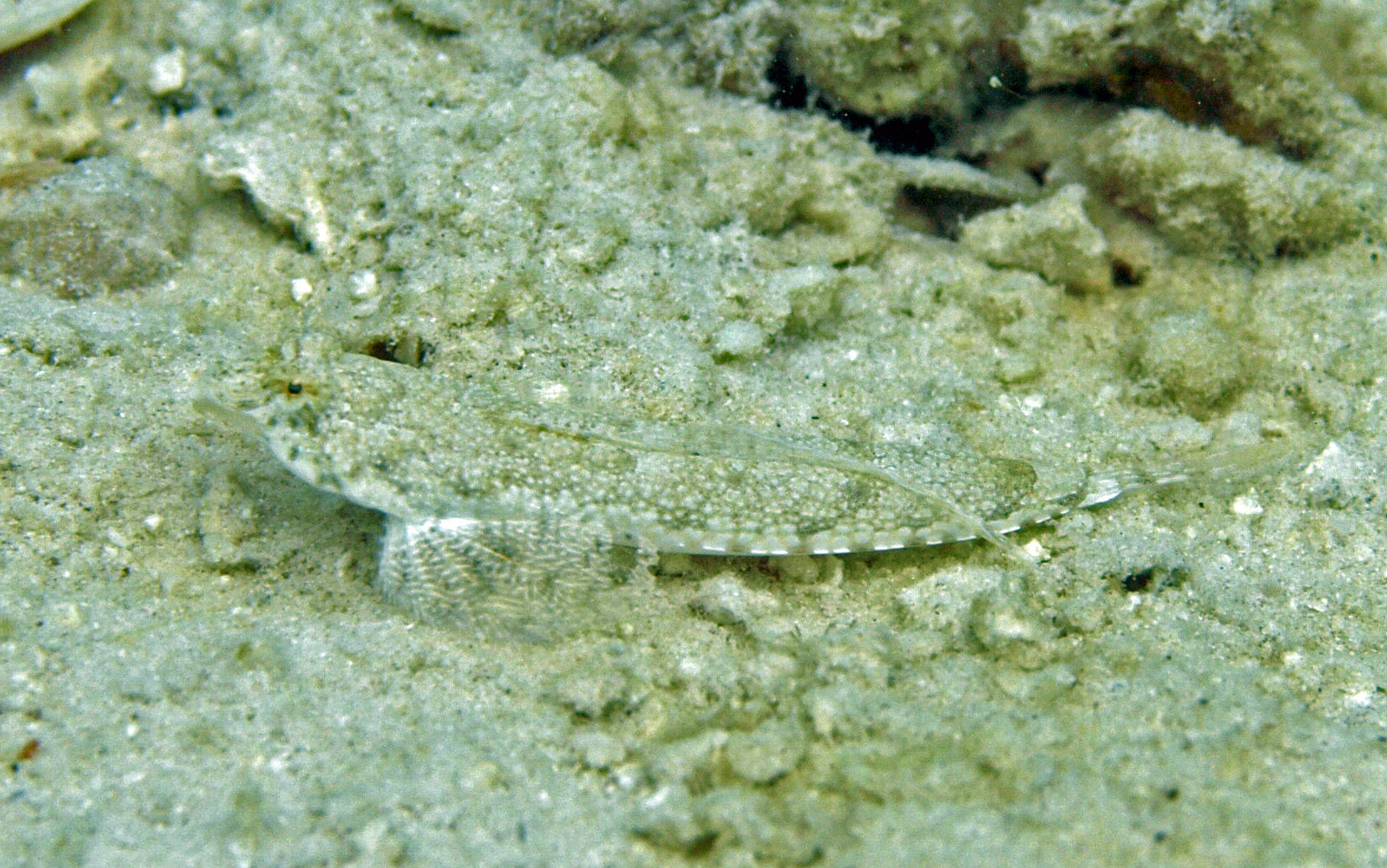

Scientific classification
- Domain: Eukaryota
- Kingdom: Animalia
- Phylum: Chordata
- Class: Actinopterygii
- Order: Callionymiformes
- Family: Callionymidae
- Genus: Callionymus
- Species: C. enneactis

Binomial name
- Callionymus enneactis Bleeker, 1879

Synonyms
- Callionymus altidorsalis Wang & Ye, 1982; Callionymus calliste Jordan & Fowler, 1903; Callionymus distethommatus Fowler, 1941; Callionymus enneatics Bleeker, 1879; Callionymus wilburi Herre, 1935; Paradiplogrammus distethommatus (Fowler, 1941); Paradiplogrammus enneactis (Bleeker, 1879); Paradiplogrammus enneactis subsp. calliste (Jordan & Fowler, 1903); Paradiplogrammus parvus Nakabo, 1984

= Callionymus enneactis =

Species of fish

Callionymus enneactis, the mangrove dragonet or common dragonet, is a species of dragonet native to the western Pacific Ocean at depths down to 15 metres (49 ft). At shallower depths it occurs in areas of mangroves, being found on coral reefs at deeper depths. This species grows to a length of 8 centimetres (3.1 in) TL.
