= Australian stinkfish =

Scientific classification
- Domain: Eukaryota
- Kingdom: Animalia
- Phylum: Chordata
- Class: Actinopterygii
- Order: Callionymiformes
- Family: Callionymidae
- Genus: Callionymus
- Species: C. australis

Binomial name
- Callionymus australis R. Fricke, 1983

Species of fish

The Australian stinkfish (Callionymus australis) also known as the Northwestern Australian sawspine dragonet, is a species of dragonet only found in the Indian Ocean off of northwestern Australia. This species grows to a length of 18 centimetres (7.1 in) TL.
