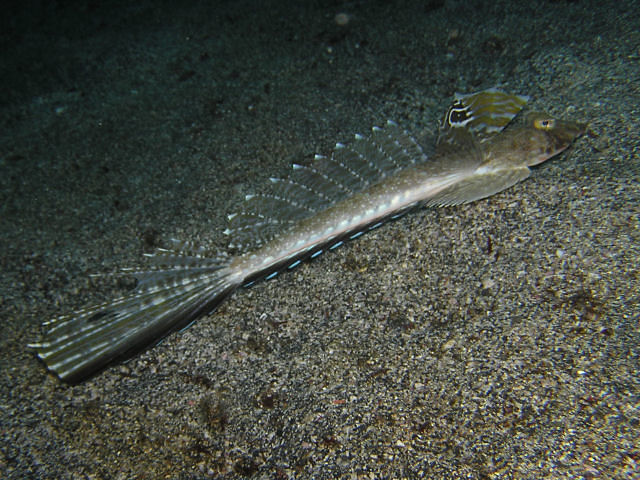

Conservation status
- Least Concern (IUCN 3.1)

Scientific classification
- Kingdom: Animalia
- Phylum: Chordata
- Class: Actinopterygii
- Order: Syngnathiformes
- Family: Callionymidae
- Genus: Callionymus
- Species: C. japonicus

Binomial name
- Callionymus japonicus Houttuyn, 1782

Synonyms
- Calliurichthys japonicus (Houttuyn, 1782); Callionymus longicaudatus (Temminck & Schlegel, 1845); Callionymus reevesii (Richardson, 1844); Calliurichthys numeri (Tanaka, 1917)

= Callionymus japonicus =

Species of fish

Callionymus japonicus, commonly known as the Japanese longtail dragonet or Japanese Dragonet, is a species of dragonet native to the western Pacific Ocean where it is found at a depth of around 208 metres (682 ft). This species grows to a length of 20 centimetres (7.9 in) SL.
