= Callionymus keeleyi =

Scientific classification
- Kingdom: Animalia
- Phylum: Chordata
- Class: Actinopterygii
- Order: Syngnathiformes
- Family: Callionymidae
- Genus: Callionymus
- Species: C. keeleyi

Binomial name
- Callionymus keeleyi Fowler, 1941

Species of fish

Callionymus keeleyi, Keeley's dragonet, is a species of dragonet native to the western Pacific Ocean where it is known to occur near the Philippines and Papua New Guinea. The specific name honours Frank James Keeley (1868–1949) of the department of mineralogy, Academy of Natural Sciences, Philadelphia.
