= Callionymus persicus =

Scientific classification
- Kingdom: Animalia
- Phylum: Chordata
- Class: Actinopterygii
- Order: Syngnathiformes
- Family: Callionymidae
- Genus: Callionymus
- Species: C. persicus

Binomial name
- Callionymus persicus Regan, 1905

Species of fish

Callionymus persicus, the Persian dragonet, is a species of dragonet native to the western Indian Ocean where it occurs at depths of from 15 to 100 metres (49 to 328 ft). This species grows to a length of 25.8 centimetres (10.2 in) TL.
