= Callionymus oxycephalus =

Scientific classification
- Kingdom: Animalia
- Phylum: Chordata
- Class: Actinopterygii
- Order: Syngnathiformes
- Family: Callionymidae
- Genus: Callionymus
- Species: C. oxycephalus

Binomial name
- Callionymus oxycephalus R. Fricke, 1980

Synonyms
- Spinicapitichthys oxycephalus (Fricke, 1980)

Species of fish

Callionymus oxycephalus, the Red Sea spiny dragonet, is a species of dragonet endemic to the Red Sea.
