= Ornamented dragonet =

Conservation status
- Vulnerable (IUCN 3.1)

Scientific classification
- Kingdom: Animalia
- Phylum: Chordata
- Class: Actinopterygii
- Order: Syngnathiformes
- Family: Callionymidae
- Genus: Callionymus
- Species: C. comptus

Binomial name
- Callionymus comptus J. E. Randall, 1999

Species of fish

The ornamented dragonet (Callionymus comptus) is a species of dragonet endemic to the waters around the Hawaiian Islands where it occurs at depths of from 3 to 28 metres (9.8 to 91.9 ft). This species grows to a length of 3 centimetres (1.2 in) SL.
