= Callionymus africanus =

Scientific classification
- Domain: Eukaryota
- Kingdom: Animalia
- Phylum: Chordata
- Class: Actinopterygii
- Order: Callionymiformes
- Family: Callionymidae
- Genus: Callionymus
- Species: C. africanus

Binomial name
- Callionymus africanus (Kotthaus, 1977)

Synonyms
- Diplogrammus africanus Kotthaus, 1977

Species of fish

Callionymus africanus, the African deepwater dragonet, is a species of dragonet native to the western Indian Ocean where it occurs at depths of from 178 to 220 metres (584 to 722 ft) off Kenya and Zanzibar and over the Chain Ridge seamount.
