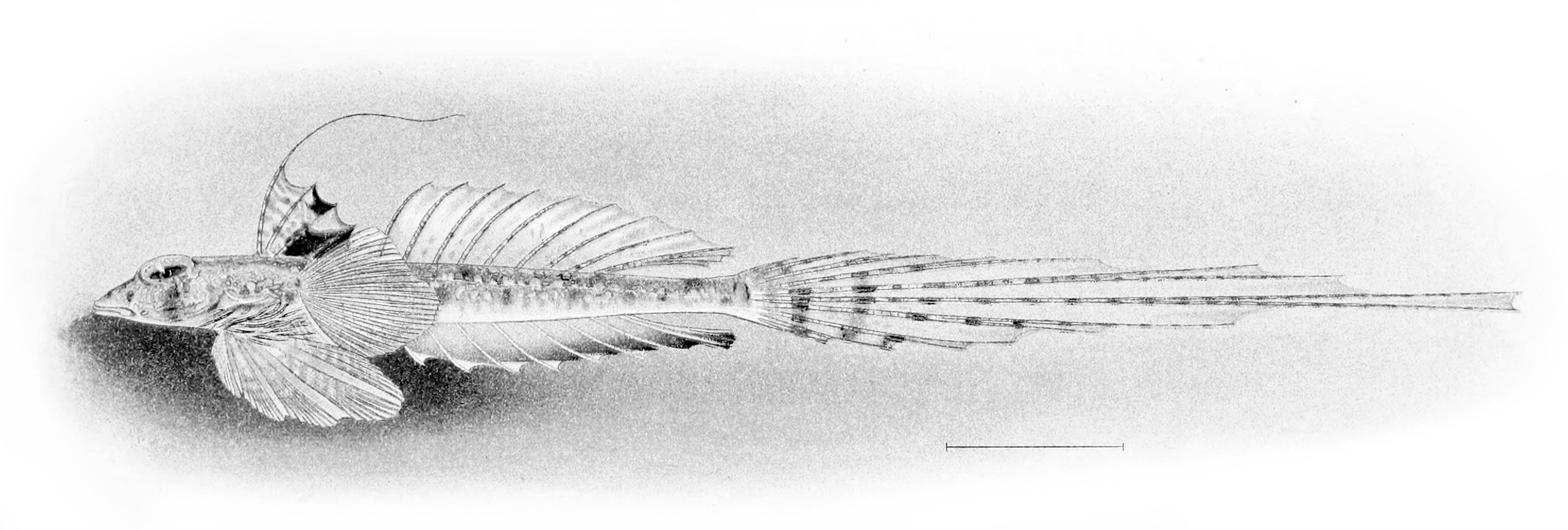

Scientific classification
- Domain: Eukaryota
- Kingdom: Animalia
- Phylum: Chordata
- Class: Actinopterygii
- Order: Callionymiformes
- Family: Callionymidae
- Genus: Callionymus
- Species: C. decoratus

Binomial name
- Callionymus decoratus (Gilbert, 1905)

Synonyms
- Calliurichthys decoratus Gilbert, 1905

= Decorated dragonet =

Species of fish

The decorated dragonet (Callionymus decoratus) is a species of dragonet endemic to the waters around the Hawaiian Islands where it occurs at depths of from 1 to 134 metres (3.3 to 439.6 ft). This species grows to a length of 20.8 centimetres (8.2 in) SL.
