= Callionymus umbrithorax =

Scientific classification
- Kingdom: Animalia
- Phylum: Chordata
- Class: Actinopterygii
- Order: Syngnathiformes
- Family: Callionymidae
- Genus: Callionymus
- Species: C. umbrithorax

Binomial name
- Callionymus umbrithorax Fowler, 1941

Species of fish

Callionymus umbrithorax, the Philippine darkthroat dragonet, is a species of dragonet native to the Pacific waters of the Philippines where it occurs at a depth of around 13 metres (43 ft).
