= Callionymus doryssus =

Scientific classification
- Kingdom: Animalia
- Phylum: Chordata
- Class: Actinopterygii
- Order: Syngnathiformes
- Family: Callionymidae
- Genus: Callionymus
- Species: C. doryssus

Binomial name
- Callionymus doryssus (Jordan & Fowler, 1903)

Synonyms
- Calliurichthys doryssus Jordan & Fowler, 1903

Species of fish

Callionymus doryssus, the Japanese filamentous dragonet, is a species of dragonet native to the Pacific waters around Japan.
