= Callionymus sublaevis =

Scientific classification
- Domain: Eukaryota
- Kingdom: Animalia
- Phylum: Chordata
- Class: Actinopterygii
- Order: Callionymiformes
- Family: Callionymidae
- Genus: Callionymus
- Species: C. sublaevis

Binomial name
- Callionymus sublaevis McCulloch, 1926

Species of fish

Callionymus sublaevis, the Australian filamentous dragonet, is a species of dragonet native to the southwestern Pacific Ocean. It is popular as a gamefish. This species grows to a length of 14.3 centimetres (5.6 in) TL.
