= Blotchfin dragonet =

Scientific classification
- Domain: Eukaryota
- Kingdom: Animalia
- Phylum: Chordata
- Class: Actinopterygii
- Order: Callionymiformes
- Family: Callionymidae
- Genus: Callionymus
- Species: C. filamentosus

Binomial name
- Callionymus filamentosus Valenciennes, 1837

Species of fish

The blotchfin dragonet (Callionymus filamentosus) is a species of dragonet native to the Indian Ocean and the western Pacific Ocean. It also now occurs in the Mediterranean Sea, where it was first recorded in 1953 off Israel. It has since been observed in Cyprus, Lebanon, Turkey and Rhodes (Greece). This species occurs at depths from 16 to 350 m and can grows to a length of 20 cm.
