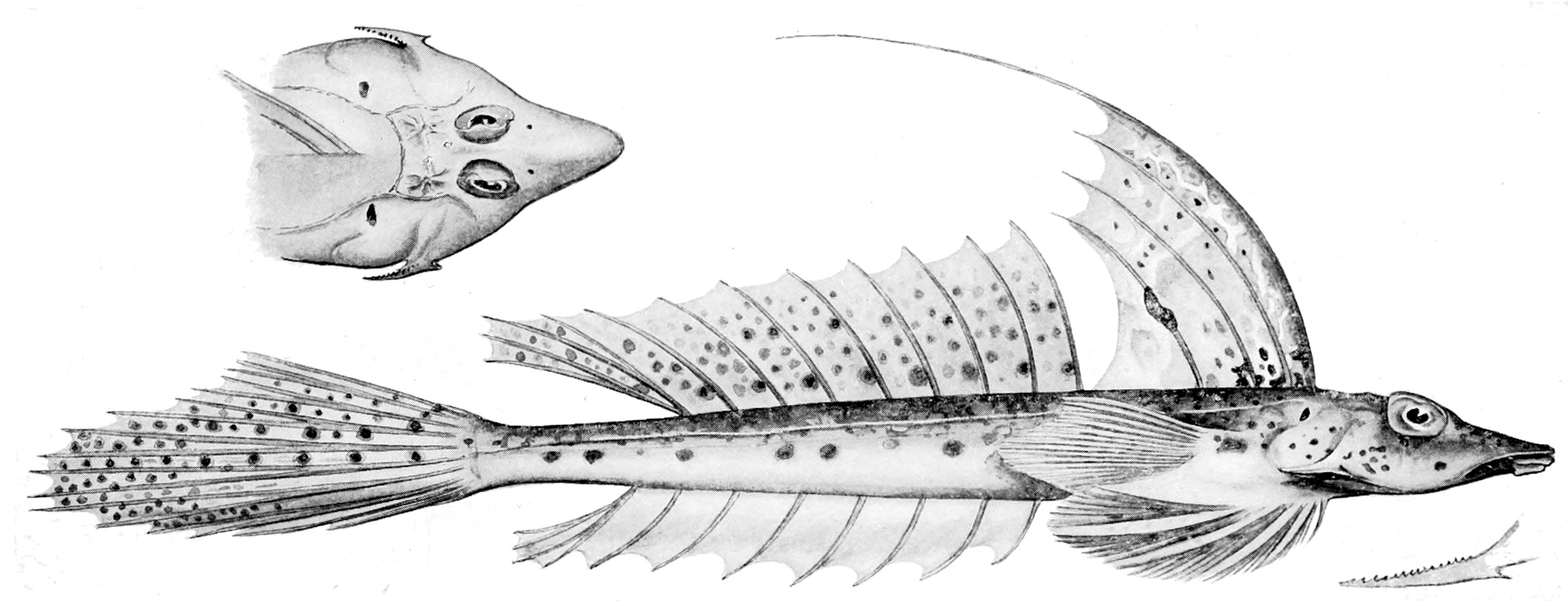

Scientific classification
- Kingdom: Animalia
- Phylum: Chordata
- Class: Actinopterygii
- Order: Syngnathiformes
- Family: Callionymidae
- Genus: Callionymus
- Species: C. grossi

Binomial name
- Callionymus grossi J. D. Ogilby, 1910

= Gross's stinkfish =

Species of fish

Gross's stinkfish (Callionymus grossi) is a species of dragonet found in the waters off of northwestern Australia. This species grows to a length of 20 centimetres (7.9 in) TL.
