= Muscat dragonet =

Scientific classification
- Kingdom: Animalia
- Phylum: Chordata
- Class: Actinopterygii
- Order: Syngnathiformes
- Family: Callionymidae
- Genus: Callionymus
- Species: C. muscatensis

Binomial name
- Callionymus muscatensis Regan, 1905

Species of fish

Callionymus muscatensis, the Muscat dragonet, is a species of dragonet native to the southern portions of the Red Sea and the Gulf of Oman. This species occurs at depths of from 40 to 70 metres (130 to 230 ft). This species grows to a length of 7.5 centimetres (3.0 in) TL.
