= Sand dragonet =

Scientific classification
- Domain: Eukaryota
- Kingdom: Animalia
- Phylum: Chordata
- Class: Actinopterygii
- Order: Callionymiformes
- Family: Callionymidae
- Genus: Callionymus
- Species: C. marleyi

Binomial name
- Callionymus marleyi Regan, 1919

Species of fish

The sand dragonet (Callionymus marleyi) is a species of dragonet native to the western Indian Ocean where it occurs at depths of from 1 to 20 metres (3.3 to 65.6 ft) over sandy substrates. Its diet consists mostly of benthic invertebrates. This species grows to a length of 13 centimetres (5.1 in) TL. The specific name most likely honours Harold Walter Bell-Marley (1873-1945) soldier and the Principal Fisheries Officer in the Natal Province from 1918 to 1937.
