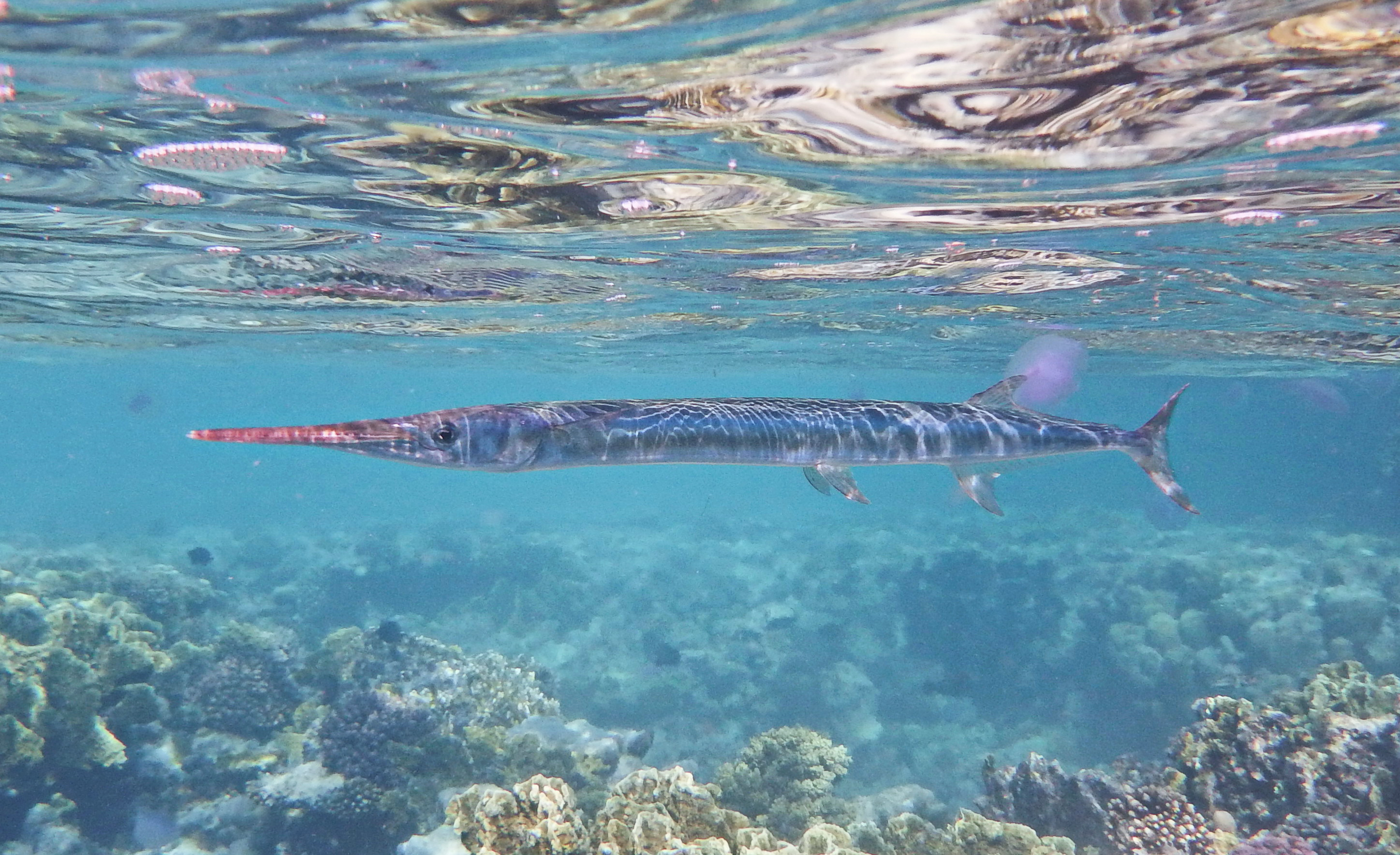
- A Red Sea houndfish
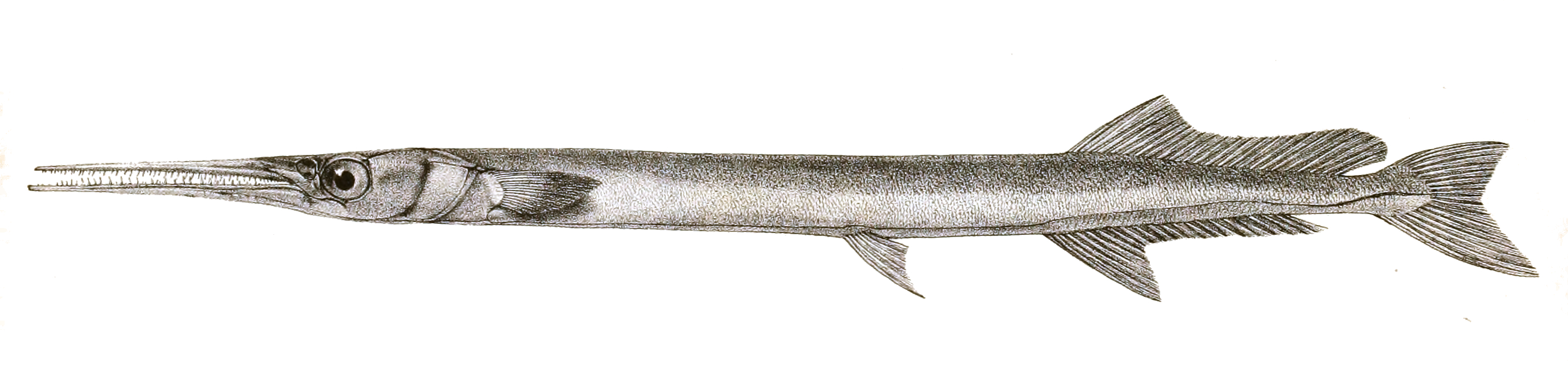

Scientific classification
- Kingdom: Animalia
- Phylum: Chordata
- Class: Actinopterygii
- Order: Beloniformes
- Family: Belonidae
- Genus: Tylosurus
- Species: T. choram

Binomial name
- Tylosurus choram (Rüppell, 1837)

Synonyms
- Belone choram Rüppell, 1837; Belone robusta Albert Günther, 1866; Esox belone marisrubri Bloch & Schneider, 1801

= Tylosurus choram =

Species of fish

Tylosurus choram, the Red Sea houndfish, is a species of needlefish from the family Belonidae. A marine fish bluish in color with a long slender body, and a pointed long toothed beak, found in most temperate, warm seas, and sometimes rivers, it is found in abundance in the Red Sea.

It is a fast predator swimming in small schools near the water surface. Like other species of needlefish this species is oviparous, laying eggs which attach themselves to objects in the water by means of filaments which cover the outer layer of the egg. Tylosurus choram is found in the Red Sea and in coastal waters around the Arabian Peninsula to the Gulf of Oman. It has been reported twice, forty years apart, in the Mediterranean Sea off Israel. This species was described as Belone choram by Eduard Rüppell in 1837 with the type locality given as the Red Sea, the specific name choram is Arabic for needlefish.

== See also ==
- List of fishes of the Red Sea.
