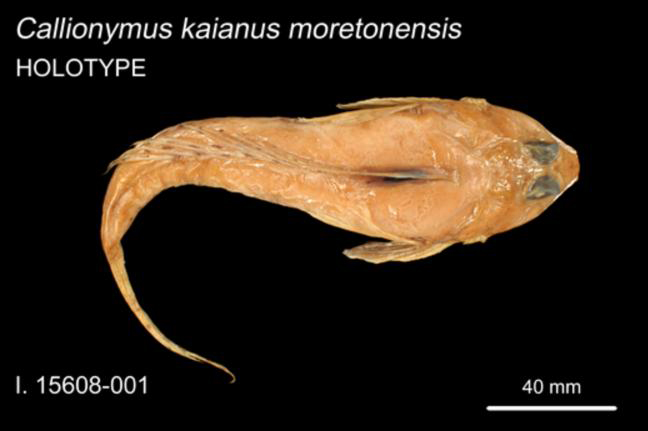

Scientific classification
- Domain: Eukaryota
- Kingdom: Animalia
- Phylum: Chordata
- Class: Actinopterygii
- Order: Callionymiformes
- Family: Callionymidae
- Genus: Callionymus
- Species: C. moretonensis

Binomial name
- Callionymus moretonensis C. R. Johnson, 1971

= Queensland stinkfish =

Species of fish

The Queensland stinkfish (Callionymus moretonensis) is a species of dragonet native to the western Pacific Ocean where it can be found in the waters off of northwestern Australia, Papua New Guinea and Melanesia. This species can be found at depths of from 124 to 132 metres (407 to 433 ft). This species grows to a length of 12 centimetres (4.7 in) TL.
