= Smallhead dragonet =

Scientific classification
- Domain: Eukaryota
- Kingdom: Animalia
- Phylum: Chordata
- Class: Actinopterygii
- Order: Callionymiformes
- Family: Callionymidae
- Genus: Callionymus
- Species: C. erythraeus

Binomial name
- Callionymus erythraeus E. Ninni, 1934

Species of fish

The smallhead dragonet (Callionymus erythraeus) is a species of dragonet native to the western Indian Ocean where it occurs at depths of from 1 to 10 metres (3.3 to 32.8 ft). It prefers sandy or muddy substrates with occasional rocks. This species grows to a length of 10 centimetres (3.9 in) TL.
