= Goodlad's stinkfish =

Scientific classification
- Kingdom: Animalia
- Phylum: Chordata
- Class: Actinopterygii
- Order: Syngnathiformes
- Family: Callionymidae
- Genus: Callionymus
- Species: C. goodladi

Binomial name
- Callionymus goodladi (Whitley, 1944)

Synonyms
- Calliurichthys goodladi Whitley, 1944

Species of fish

Goodlad's stinkfish (Callionymus goodladi) is a species of dragonet native to the waters off of northwestern Australia. This bottom-dwelling species is also found in the aquarium trade. This species grows to a length of 22 centimetres (8.7 in) TL.

Discovered in Western Australia by Matt Goodlad, who was a Shetlander who migrated to Western Australia in the 1920s with his brother James. They both worked for the government fisheries dept at some stage as inspectors.
