= Callionymus amboina =

Scientific classification
- Domain: Eukaryota
- Kingdom: Animalia
- Phylum: Chordata
- Class: Actinopterygii
- Order: Callionymiformes
- Family: Callionymidae
- Genus: Callionymus
- Species: C. amboina

Binomial name
- Callionymus amboina Suwardji, 1965

Species of fish

Callionymus amboina, the Ambon darter dragonet, is a species of dragonet native to the Pacific waters around Indonesia where it occurs at depths of from 8 to 50 metres (26 to 164 ft).
