= Longtail dragonet =

Scientific classification
- Kingdom: Animalia
- Phylum: Chordata
- Class: Actinopterygii
- Order: Syngnathiformes
- Family: Callionymidae
- Genus: Callionymus
- Species: C. gardineri

Binomial name
- Callionymus gardineri Regan, 1908

Synonyms
- Calliurichthys gardineri (Regan, 1908); Callionymus maldivensis Regan, 1908

Species of fish

The longtail dragonet (Callionymus gardineri) is a species of dragonet native to the western Indian Ocean. It can be found at depths of from 30 to 180 metres (98 to 591 ft). This species grows to a length of 28 centimetres (11 in) TL. The specific name honours the British zoologist John Stanley Gardiner (1872–1946).
