= Tetsuji Nakabo =

Japanese ichthyologist

- 中坊 徹次
- Born: November 8, 1949 (age 77); Kyoto Prefecture, Japan
- Education: Kyoto University
- Known for: Rediscovery of the kunimasu
- Scientific career
- Fields: Ichthyology
- Workplaces: Kyoto University

Tetsuji Nakabo (中坊 徹次, Nakabo Tetsuji; born 8 November 1949) is a Japanese ichthyologist and professor emeritus of Kyoto University.

He is known for his research in fish systematics and taxonomy, and for his role in the rediscovery of the kunimasu (Oncorhynchus kawamurae), a fish previously believed to have become extinct.

== Biography ==
Nakabo was born in 1949 in Kyoto Prefecture, Japan. He graduated from the Faculty of Agriculture at Kyoto University in March 1973, where he studied fisheries science.

In 1981, he received a Doctor of Agriculture degree from Kyoto University for his dissertation entitled A Revision and Systematics of the Dragonets (Pisces: Callionymidae).

After serving as an associate professor in the Department of Fisheries at Kyoto University's Faculty of Agriculture, Nakabo became a professor at the Kyoto University Museum in April 1997. He subsequently also held a professorship in the university's Graduate School of Agriculture.

His academic specialization is fish phylogeny and taxonomy. His research has included phylogenetic analysis, the reassessment of scientific names, and the description and naming of new fish species. He also served as director of the Kyoto University Museum. He became professor emeritus of Kyoto University in 2015.

=== Rediscovery of the kunimasu ===
Nakabo is particularly well known for his role in the rediscovery of the kunimasu, a freshwater salmonid fish endemic to Lake Tazawa in Akita Prefecture that had been considered extinct.

In 2010, illustrations of the fish were commissioned from Japanese television personality and fish illustrator Sakana-kun. To prepare the illustrations, Sakana-kun obtained specimens of kokanee salmon (Oncorhynchus nerka), including specimens collected from Lake Saiko in Yamanashi Prefecture. One of these specimens exhibited characteristics resembling those of the supposedly extinct kunimasu.

Sakana-kun brought the unusual specimen to Nakabo's attention, suggesting that it might be a kunimasu. Nakabo subsequently examined the specimen and conducted research that confirmed the fish's identity, establishing that the species had survived in Lake Saiko.

The discovery attracted considerable attention in Japan. During his birthday press conference on 23 December 2010, Emperor Akihito, himself an amateur ichthyologist, referred to the rediscovery as a remarkable event and mentioned both Nakabo and Sakana-kun.

== Selected publications ==
=== Books ===
==== As author ====
- Hakketsu-gyo Kunimasu no hakken: Watashitachi wa "kono shu" kara nani o manabu ka (絶滅魚クニマスの発見 私たちは「この種」から何を学ぶか; The Discovery of the Extinct Fish Kunimasu: What Can We Learn from This Species?). Shinchosha, 2021. ISBN 978-4-10-603864-8.

==== As co-author ====
- Gyokai-shi of the East China Sea and Yellow Sea (東シナ海・黄海の魚類誌). With Umeyoshi Yamada, Muneharu Tokimura and Hiroshi Horikawa. Tokai University Press, March 2007. ISBN 978-4-486-01740-0.
- Fishes of the Pacific Coast of Southern Japan (南日本太平洋沿岸の魚類). With Hiromi Ikeda. Tokai University Press, March 2015. ISBN 978-4-486-02044-8.
- Scientific Names of All Japanese Fishes: Their Etymologies and Explanations (日本産魚類全種の学名 語源と解説). With Yoshihiro Hirashima. Tokai University Press, April 2015. ISBN 978-4-486-02064-6.

=== As editor ===
- Fishes of Japan with Pictorial Keys to the Species (日本産魚類検索 全種の同定). Tokai University Press, October 1993. ISBN 4-486-01250-X.
- Nihon Dobutsu Daihyakka, Volume 6: Fishes (日本動物大百科 6 魚類). Heibonsha, June 1998. ISBN 4-582-54556-4.
- Tsuri-uo Kensaku (釣魚検索). Co-edited with Hideto Konishi. Weekly Fishing Sunday, December 1998. ISBN 4-87958-661-7.
- The Fish of Iburi and the Kuroshio Current: From Whale Sharks to Ocean Sunfish (以布利黒潮の魚 ジンベエザメからマンボウまで). Osaka Aquarium Kaiyukan, April 2001. ISBN 4-931418-04-X.
- Illustrated Guide to Identifying Game Fish (釣魚識別図鑑 ここで見分けよう). Written by Hideto Konishi. Enterbrain, June 2008. ISBN 978-4-7577-4343-4.
- Japanese Fish Encyclopedia: Detailed Photographs and Descriptions (日本魚類館 精緻な写真と詳しい解説). Shogakukan, March 2018. ISBN 978-4-09-208311-0.

=== As supervisor and contributor ===
- Multimedia Encyclopedia of Fishes: Guidebook, Revised Edition (マルチメディア魚類図鑑 ガイドブック 改訂版). Supervised by Nakabo; commentary by Satoshi Taguchi. ASCII, June 1999. ISBN 4-7561-3103-4.
- The Illustrated Encyclopedia of Fish for Anglers (遊遊さかな大図鑑 釣り人のための 釣魚写真大全). Supervised by Nakabo; edited by Hideto Konishi. Enterbrain, July 2007. ISBN 978-4-7577-3531-6.
- Oshiete! Sakana-kun, volumes 1–3 (おしえて！さかなクン). Written by Sakana-kun. Kadokawa Tsubasa Bunko, 2009–2011. Nakabo served as supervisor and contributed commentary.
  - Volume 1, November 2009. ISBN 978-4-04-631063-7.
  - Volume 2, February 2010. ISBN 978-4-04-631084-2.
  - Volume 3, June 2011. ISBN 978-4-04-631171-9.

=== As supervising translator ===
- Unknown World of Animals, Volume 2: Primitive Fishes (知られざる動物の世界 2 原始的な魚のなかま). Asakura Publishing, May 2011. ISBN 978-4-254-17762-6.
- Unknown World of Animals, Volume 3: Rays, Chimaeras and Eels (知られざる動物の世界 3 エイ・ギンザメ・ウナギのなかま). Asakura Publishing, August 2011. ISBN 978-4-254-17763-3.

== Selected scientific papers ==
- Nakabo, Tetsuji; Iwata, Akihisa (1979–1980). "沖縄より得られた日本初記録のタンザクテグリ (新称), Anaona tentaculata" [First Japanese record of Anaona tentaculata from Okinawa]. Japanese Journal of Ichthyology. 26 (1): 89–93. doi:10.11369/jji1950.26.89.
- Nakabo, Tetsuji (1979–1980). "西部インド洋から得たネズッポ属魚類の1新種と2稀種" [One new and two rare species of dragonets from the western Indian Ocean]. Japanese Journal of Ichthyology. 26 (3): 231–237. doi:10.11369/jji1950.26.231.
- Nakabo, Tetsuji; Yamamoto, Eiichi (1979–1980). "九州-パラオ海嶺より得られたイナカヌメリ科の1新種Centrodraco otohime, オトヒメヌメリ" [A new species of Draconettidae, Centrodraco otohime, from the Kyushu–Palau Ridge]. Japanese Journal of Ichthyology. 26 (4): 325–328. doi:10.11369/jji1950.26.325.
- Nakabo, Tetsuji (1981–1982). "イナカヌメリ科魚類の分類学的再検討" [A taxonomic revision of the family Draconettidae]. Japanese Journal of Ichthyology. 28 (4): 355–367. doi:10.11369/jji1950.28.355.
- Nakabo, Tetsuji; Jeon, Sang-rin (1985–1986). "韓国初記録のセトヌメリ (ネズッポ科)" [First record of Repomucenus setosus from Korea]. Japanese Journal of Ichthyology. 32 (4): 447–449. doi:10.11369/jji1950.32.447.
- Nakabo, Tetsuji; Iwata, Akihisa; Ikeda, Yuji (1992–1993). "日本初記録のネズッポ科ミナミコブヌメリ" [First Japanese record of a callionymid fish]. Japanese Journal of Ichthyology. 39 (1): 103–106. doi:10.11369/jji1950.39.103.
- Sakai, Keiichi; Nakabo, Tetsuji (1995). "イスズミの分類学的再検討" [Taxonomic revision of Kyphosus vaigiensis]. Japanese Journal of Ichthyology. 42 (1): 61–70. doi:10.11369/jji1950.42.61.
- Ikeda, Yuji; Nakabo, Tetsuji; Hiramatsu, Wataru (1995). "ヒレナガハゼの再記載と新模式標本の指定" [Redescription of Acanthogobius flavimanus and designation of a new type specimen]. Japanese Journal of Ichthyology. 42 (3–4): 303–310. doi:10.11369/jji1950.42.303.
- Nakabo, Tetsuji (2011). "クニマスについて : 秋田県田沢湖での絶滅から70年" [On the kunimasu: 70 years since its extinction in Lake Tazawa, Akita Prefecture]. Taxa: Proceedings of the Japanese Society of Systematic Zoology. 30: 31–54. doi:10.19004/taxa.30.0_31.
- Nakabo, Tetsuji (2011). "クニマス Oncorhynchus kawamurae -絶滅から復活，そして今後-" [Kunimasu, Oncorhynchus kawamurae: From extinction to rediscovery and its future]. Nippon Suisan Gakkaishi. 77 (3): 469–472. doi:10.2331/suisan.77.469.
- Akihito; Aizawa, Masahiro; Ikeda, Yuji; Kishida, Munenori; Hayashi, Kimiyoshi; Nakayama, Koji; Nakabo, Tetsuji (2019). "京都御苑の仙洞御所の池に生息するビワヨシノボリRhinogobius biwaensisとシマヒレヨシノボリRhinogobius sp. BFの野外交雑個体" [A natural hybrid between Rhinogobius biwaensis and Rhinogobius sp. BF in a pond at the Sento Imperial Palace Garden, Kyoto]. Japanese Journal of Ichthyology. 66 (1): 53–62. doi:10.11369/jji.18-044.
