= Ronald Fricke =

German ichthyologist

Ronald Fricke is a German ichthyologist and researcher of biodiversity at the State Museum of Natural History Stuttgart. As of 2022, Fricke authored 8 families, 10 genera and 186 species within the families of Callionymidae, Gobiesocidae, Ophichthidae, Tripterygiidae and other families.

He is a co-editor of Eschmeyer's Catalog of Fishes; among his current tasks is the building of a digital ichthyological literature archive.

== Publications ==
See Wikispecies below.

== Taxon described by him ==
- See Category:Taxa named by Ronald Fricke
