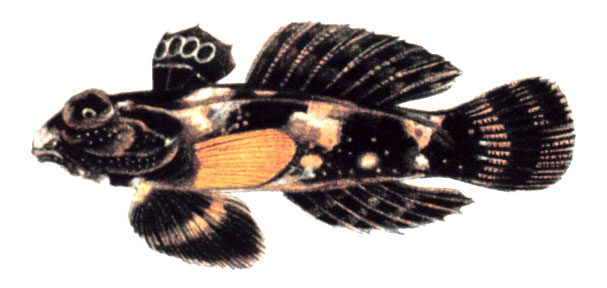
- Ocellated dragonet, Synchiropus ocellatus

Scientific classification
- Kingdom: Animalia
- Phylum: Chordata
- Class: Actinopterygii
- Division: Teleostei
- Order: Syngnathiformes
- Suborder: Callionymoidei
- Family: Callionymidae; Bonaparte, 1831

Type species
- Callionymus lyra Linnaeus, 1758

Genera
- See text

= Dragonet =

Dragonets Temporal range: Middle Eocene–present

Family of fishes

Dragonets are small percomorph marine fish of the diverse family Callionymidae (from the Greek kallis, "beautiful" and onyma, "name") found mainly in the tropical waters of the western Indo-Pacific. They are benthic organisms, spending most of their time near the sandy bottoms, at a depth of roughly two hundred meters. There exist 139 species of the fish, in nineteen genera.

Due to similarities in morphology and behavior, dragonets are sometimes confused with members of the goby family. However, male dragonets can be differentiated from the goby by their very long dorsal fins, and females by their protruding lower jaws. The Draconettidae may be considered a sister family, whose members are very much alike, though rarely seen.

== Genera ==
The following genera are classified within the Callionymidae:

- Anaora J. E. Gray, 1835
- Bathycallionymus Nakabo, 1982
- Callionymus Linnaeus, 1758 (including Calliurichthys)
- Diplogrammus Gill, 1865 (including Chalinops)
- Draculo Snyder, 1911
- Eleutherochir Bleeker, 1879
- Eocallionymus Nakabo, 1982
- Foetorepus Whitley, 1931
- Neosynchiropus Nalbant, 1979
- Paracallionymus Barnard, 1927
- Protogrammus Fricke, 1985
- Pseudocalliurichthys Nakabo, 1982
- Repomucenus Whitley, 1931
- Spinicapitichthys Fricke, 1980
- Synchiropus Gill, 1859
- Tonlesapia Motomura & Mukai, 2006

The fossil genus †Protonymus Sytchevskaya & Prokofiev, 2007 is known from fossil skeletons from the Middle Miocene of Krasnodar, Russia. Based on its morphology, it appears to be among the most primitive of the Callionymidae. Outside of this genus, as well as a single Callionymus species (C. macrocephalus) and an alleged Diplogrammus specimen, fossil skeletons of this family are extremely rare. Otoliths assigned to Callionymus are known dating back to the Middle Eocene.

== Description ==
These "little dragons" are generally very colorful and possess cryptic patterns. Their bodies are elongated and scaleless. A large preopercular spine is characteristic of this fish, and has been reported to be venomous in some species. All fins are large, showy and elongated; the first high dorsal fin usually has four spines; in males, the first of these spines may be further adorned with filamentous extensions. Dragonets have flattened, triangular heads with large mouths and eyes; their tail fins are fan-shaped and tapered.

The largest species, the longtail dragonet (Callionymus gardineri) reaches a length of 30 centimetres (12 in). At the other end of the spectrum, the Saint Helena dragonet (Callionymus sanctaehelenae) reaches a length of just 2 centimetres (0.79 in). Many species exhibit marked sexual dimorphism: males and females are coloured and patterned differently from each other, and (in addition to the spine filament) males have a much higher dorsal fin. This difference is extreme in the high-finned dragonet (Synchiropus rameus).

== Reproduction ==
Dragonet spawning occurs during late afternoons, right before the sun sets. The fish's spawning behavior is divided into four distinctive stages: courtship display, pairing, ascending, and the release of eggs and milt. Both male and female dragonets have been observed displaying and courting each other, although the practice is much more frequent in the males. Females only do so when they are ready to spawn and are in need of a mate. Both sexes display by spreading their pectoral and caudal fins, and moving around or by the side of the other sex. Males will sometimes also spread their dorsal fins, repeatedly open and close their mouths, and position themselves on top of the females and rub their abdomens with their bodies. If a female accepts a male for spawning, they form a pair. Occasionally, another male might intrude upon the pair as they are mating and attempt to sneak fertilizations with the female. Such an act would result in aggression by the original male.

Prior to spawning, a male and female dragonet pair will ascend approximately 0.7-1.2 meters up a water column from the sand at the bottom of the ocean. The male assumes a parallel position to the female, touching the female's side with the part of its body near its ventral fin. The pair rises slowly up the water column, moving in a semicircular manner by swimming with their pectoral fins. The ascent occurs in two phases. During the first phase, the dragonet pair moves upward about fifteen centimeters and rests for around five seconds. Then it proceeds with its second rise. During this second phase of the ascent, the male and female flex their bodies and move their genital papillae toward each other. The male releases its ejaculate and the female releases its eggs. The release of eggs occurs singly and continuously for approximately five seconds. The eggs are pelagic, floating freely in the water column. The female releases a high number of eggs during each spawning, and the dragonets do not guard their offspring. The eggs are buoyant, so they intermingle with plankton and get swept away by the ocean current. After the spawning, the dragonet pair parts from each other and swims back down to the ocean floor. Male dragonets are polygynous, and will begin to search for other females to repeat the mating process with. They generally spawn with several different females within one reproductive day. Dragonets are very sexually dimorphic, with the males being much larger and having longer fins than the females. This sexual dimorphism may have evolved in males in response to female mate choice, male-male competition, or both.

== Competition/aggression ==
Male dragonets form dominance hierarchies and act extremely aggressively towards each other. They are often observed chasing and biting, which occurs primarily when two males are close to a female during courtship and pairing. Fights can be very intense; when one male recognizes another male near its breeding site, it will rush toward it and bite at its rival's mouth. The two may bite at each other and twist their bodies around one another for longer than a minute. As a result of this behavior, male dragonets suffer higher mortality rates than females do after attaining maturation. The highest mortality rates in adult males occur during breeding. Males have evolved larger bodies, as well as longer spines and rays, in order to achieve dominance in reproduction. They have also developed bright colors so as to more effectively compete for female attention. These secondary sex characteristics further reduce the survival potential of male dragonets, as they increase the risk of predation, require greater energy costs, and escalate the risk of suffering injuries.

== Feeding ==
Feeding by the dragonet occurs throughout the day, including the intervals between courtships and spawning. The fish feeds entirely on benthic sources, primarily copepods, amphipods, and other small invertebrates living on blades of sea grass. Species of dragonets from different locations show variations in specific food preference, attributable to the different availabilities and abundances of food organisms in those places. All of them feed by extending their highly protractible jaws toward their food and drawing it into the mouths, frequently followed by the expulsion of sand. No evidence suggests that dragonets are territorial. Individuals do not defend specific areas of substrate, as well as any resources that might be present on them, from intrusion by conspecifics or other fish species.

Among Calliurichthys japonicus and Repomucenus huguenini, the two most abundant dragonet species, amphipods are the most plentiful prey during the spring and winter months. The fish also supplement their diets with polychaetes, bivalves, and gastropods in these periods. During the summer, the dragonets feed primarily on ophiuroids and amphipods. In this season, ophiuroids are the most dominant in number. Finally, in the fall, the two species predominantly consume polychaetes, amphipods, and gastropods, with polychaetes contributing the highest amount.

== Locomotion ==
Four types of swimming are observed in the dragonet. The first is burst swimming, the most common of the four, and utilized during foraging. The dragonet uses its pelvic fins to propel its body off of a substrate, and then its pectoral fins to guide itself forward. The second is continuous swimming, often utilized by males when approaching a potential mate or retreating during an aggressive encounter with another male. The dragonet uses its pectoral fins to propel its body forward, and its pelvic fins to lift and guide itself. The third type of swimming is rapid swimming, which is observed when the dragonet is attacking or fleeing. The fish primarily uses its caudal fins to achieve a quick speed. Finally, the fourth type is vertical swimming, utilized by the dragonet during spawning when it ascends. The pectoral fins are used to propel the fish's body up the water column.

== Defense ==
In defense against its predators, the dragonet rapidly buries itself under the sand at the bottom of the ocean so that only its eyes remain visible. Many species of the fish also are capable of producing and secreting foul-tasting and -smelling substances that may ward off any potential predators.

== See also ==
- List of fish common names
- List of fish families
