= Ecsenius portenoyi =

Conservation status
- Least Concern (IUCN 3.1)

Scientific classification
- Kingdom: Animalia
- Phylum: Chordata
- Class: Actinopterygii
- Division: Teleostei
- Order: Blenniiformes
- Family: Blenniidae
- Genus: Ecsenius
- Species: E. portenoyi

Binomial name
- Ecsenius portenoyi V. G. Springer, 1988

Species of fish

Ecsenius portenoyi , Portenoy's blenny or the brownback coralblenny, is a species of marine ray-finned fish belonging to the family Blenniidae, the combtooth blennies. This blenny is found in the Western Central Pacific Ocean.

== Taxonomy ==
Ecsenius portenoyi was first formally described in 1988 by the American ichthyologist Victor G. Springer with its type locality given as a reef 100 m (330 ft) offshore of the north coast of Rotuma. The genus Escenius is classified within the subfamily Salariinae of the combtooth blenny family Blenniidae. Within the genus this species is regarded to be a member of the E. pardus species complex.

== Etymology ==
Ecsenius portenoyi is classified in the genus Ecsenius, a name which its proposer, Allan Riverstone McCulloch, did not explain but it may be ec-, from ec-qui meaning "really"; senio, which means "six each", which would be an allusion to the lateral row of 6-7 small, sharp, slender, and pointed teeth running backwards on the mandible, these being regarded as the main distinguishing character of this genus. The specific name, portenoyi, honors Norman S. Portenoy of Bethesda, Maryland, , who was recognized by the staff of the National Museum of Natural History for his years supportung the museum's ichthyological exploration.

== Description ==
Ecsenius portenoyi has an elongated body, with an oval cross section, which reaches a standard length of 4.5 cm (1.8 in). The dorsal fin is supported by 12 spines and 13 soft rays while the anal fin contains 2 spines and 14-16 soft rays. The background color of the head and the body is brownish, the head shows tinges of pink below the eyes. There is a blackish stripe behind the eye and another blackish crescent shaped stripe on the operculum. The upper half of the iris is blackish with four or five pale rays and the lower half is white. The stripe behin the eye continues as a bright-white stripe along the length of much of the body. The spots on the body are blackm there is a line of white streaks in the lower third of the body. The pectoral fins have on or two white spots on ther fleshy bases. Some fresh specimens, collected at Rotuma, show a salmon-pink, semi-circular area covering the lower lip and a small are immediately beind it.

== Distribution and habitat ==
Ecsenius portenoyi is found in the Western Central Pacific Ocean. It has been recorded from Rotuma in Fiji, Tutuila in American Samoa, Tonga and Uvea. This species is typically found on the seaward side of reef crests where there is rock and dead coral with some live coral, at depths between 2 and 18 m (6 ft 7 in and 59 ft 1 in).
