= Ecsenius caeruliventris =

Conservation status
- Least Concern (IUCN 3.1)

Scientific classification
- Kingdom: Animalia
- Phylum: Chordata
- Class: Actinopterygii
- Order: Blenniiformes
- Family: Blenniidae
- Genus: Ecsenius
- Species: E. caeruliventris

Binomial name
- Ecsenius caeruliventris V. G. Springer & G. R. Allen, 2004

Species of fish

Ecsenius caeruliventris, known commonly as the bluebelly blenny in Indonesia, is a species of combtooth blenny in the genus Ecsenius. It is a tropical blenny found in the western Pacific ocean, specifically in Sulawesi, Indonesia. Male Ecsenius caeruliventris can reach a maximum length of 2.4 centimetres, while females can reach a maximum length of 2.37 centimetres; it is one of the smallest blennies in Ecsenius. The species name means "sky-blue belly" from the Latin words caeruleus and ventris, referring to the blue abdomen on the species; the common name is derived from this. The species is most similar to its sister taxon E. shirleyae and E. bandanus.

Ecsenius caeruliventris are oviparous, and guard their eggs. The blennies swim at a depth range of 3–5 metres.
