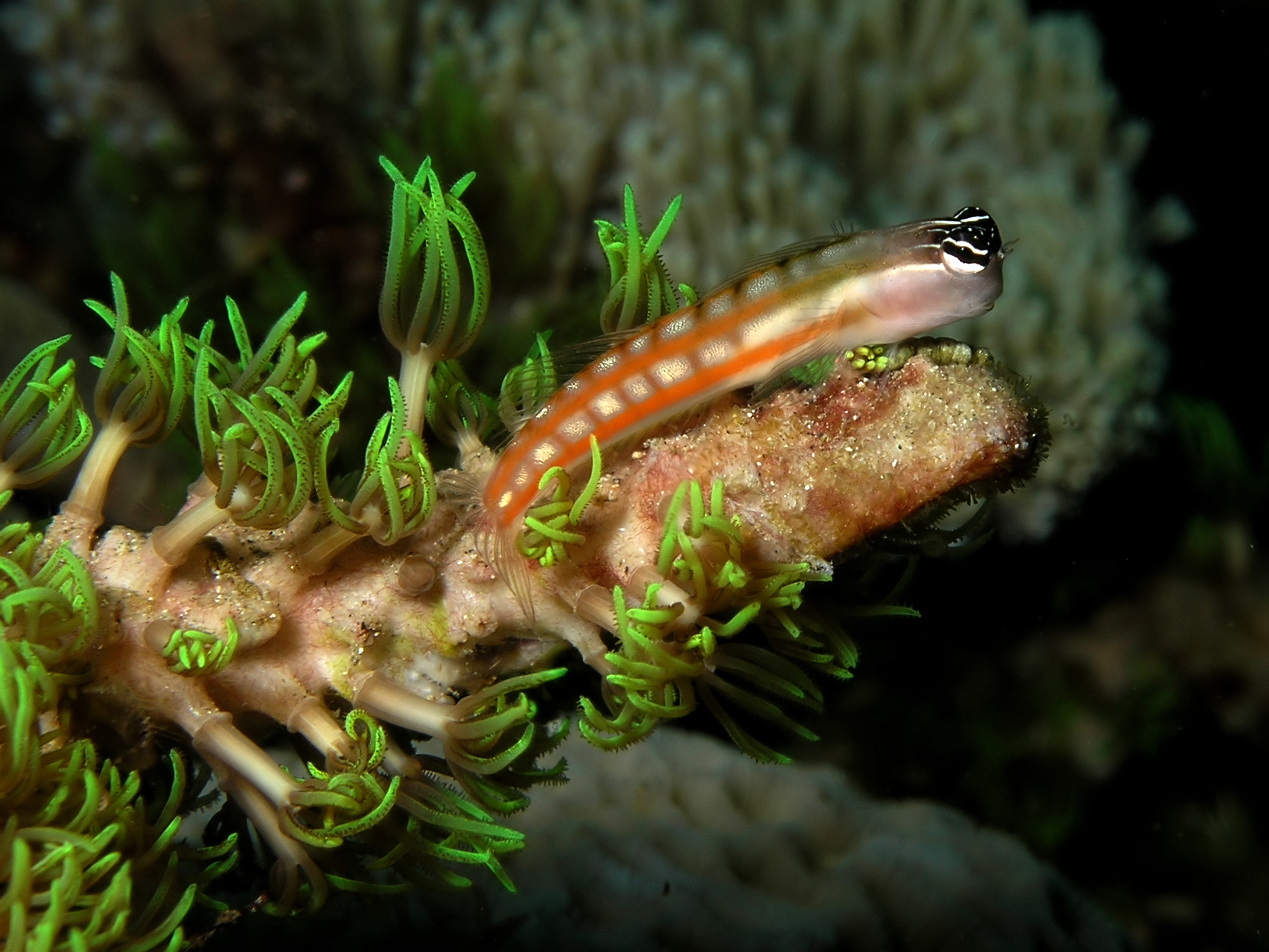
- Australian blenny in East Timor

Conservation status
- Least Concern (IUCN 3.1)

Scientific classification
- Kingdom: Animalia
- Phylum: Chordata
- Class: Actinopterygii
- Order: Blenniiformes
- Family: Blenniidae
- Genus: Ecsenius
- Species: E. australianus

Binomial name
- Ecsenius australianus V. G. Springer, 1988

= Australian blenny =

Species of fish

The Australian blenny (Ecsenius australianus) is a small marine blennioid fish of the genus Ecsenius. They are small and reddish brown with a white ventral side. Australian blennies inhabit the shallow marine waters of the tropics. They are often found along the Great Barrier Reef and Coral Sea of Australia.

== Taxonomy ==
This species is believed to be most closely related to E. fourmanoiri. Similarities between these two species include "broad, darkly dusky bands and stripes" and "dark opercular margin[s]", which are not found in other members of the "Opsifrontalis Group". Preserved specimens also bear similarity to E. opsifrontalis. However, E. australianus differ from E. opsifrontalis and E. fourmanoiri by their number of fins rays and vertebrae.

== Description ==
Australian blennies are small fish, reaching lengths of only 6 centimetres (2.4 in). The dorsal two-thirds of the body is reddish-brown, with white spots forming two rows. The ventral third is white in colour. A reddish-brown stripe with white edges passes from the rear end of the operculum (gill covering) through the eyes. The colour of the stripes can vary by specimen, between bright orange-red and pinkish brown. Towards the posterior end, colouration turns grey.

The dorsal fin has twelve spines and 13–15 soft rays. The anal fin has two spines and 15–17 soft rays. The pectoral fin usually has 13 soft rays but can occasionally have 14. The tail (caudal) fin possesses 14 rays.

Australian blennies are oviparous and lay eggs. The eggs develop at the bottom of the body of water and are adhesive.

== Distribution and habitat ==
Australian blennies are distributed in the western Pacific Ocean, occurring in the Great Barrier Reef and Coral Sea. They are associated with coral reefs and occur in shallow waters along the northern Great Barrier Reef of Australia. Whilst they are currently restricted to the northern Great Barrier Reef region, their range may expand southwards with those of several other similarly distributed species as temperatures increase due to climate change.
