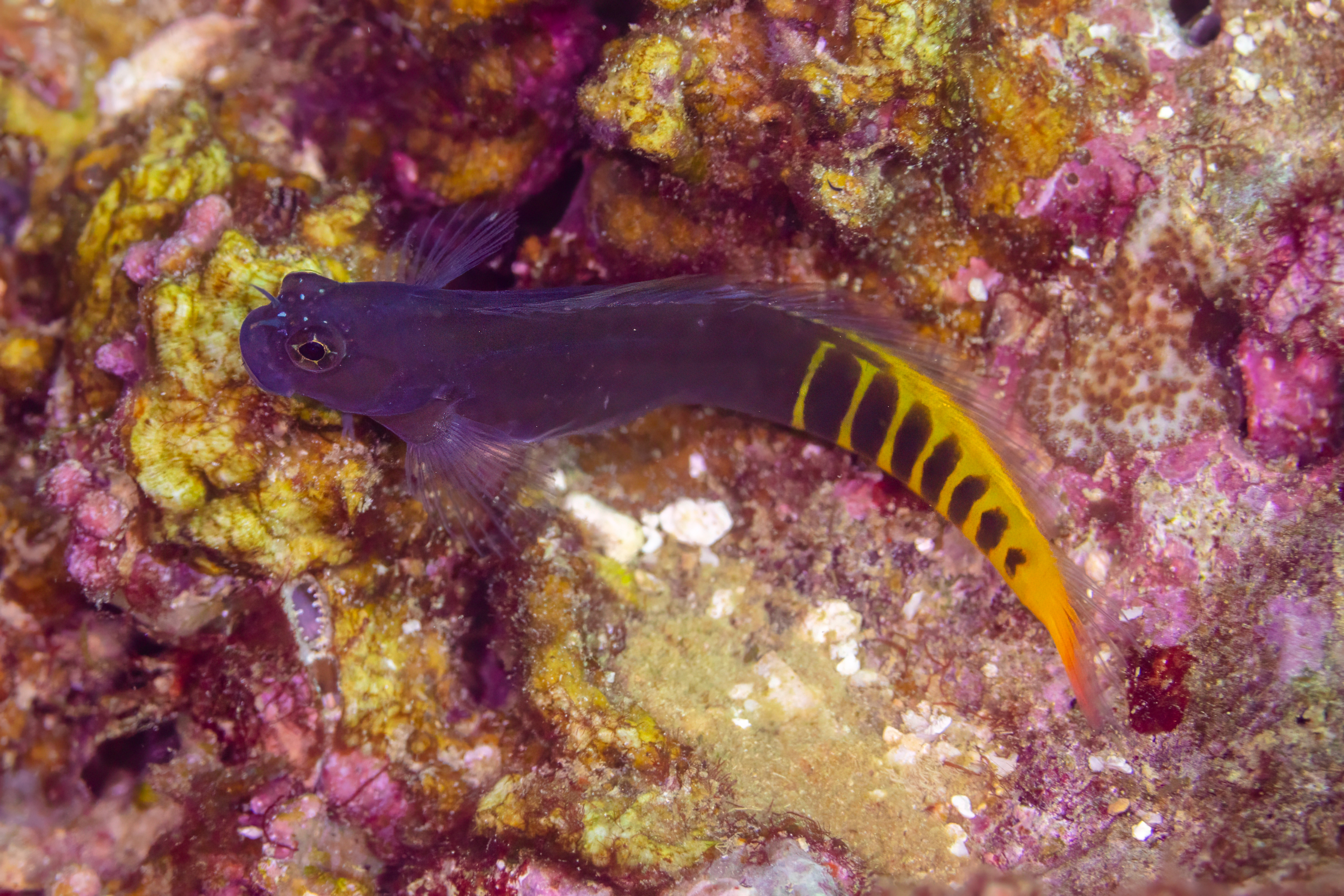

Conservation status
- Least Concern (IUCN 3.1)

Scientific classification
- Kingdom: Animalia
- Phylum: Chordata
- Class: Actinopterygii
- Division: Teleostei
- Order: Blenniiformes
- Family: Blenniidae
- Genus: Ecsenius
- Species: E. pulcher

Binomial name
- Ecsenius pulcher (J. A. Murray, 1887)

Synonyms
- Salarias pulcher J. A. Murray, 1887; Salarias phantasticus Boulenger, 1897; Salarias anomalus Regan, 1905

= Ecsenius pulcher =

Species of fish

Ecsenius pulcher, the Gulf blenny, is a species of marine ray-finned fish belonging to the family Blenniidae, the combtooth blennies. This blenny is found along the coasts of the Arabian Sea and the Persian Gulf in the Western Indian Ocean.

== Taxonomy ==
Ecsenius pulcher was first formally described as Salarias pulcher in 1887 by the British zoologist James Alexander Murray with its type locality given as Manora Rocks, Karachiin modern Pakistan. In 1971 it was recognised as Ecsenius pulcher by Victor G. Springer as the type species of the pulcher species complex of the genus Ecsenius. The genus Escenius is classified within the subfamily Salariinae of the combtooth blenny family Blenniidae.

== Etymology ==
Ecsenius pulcher is classified in the genus Ecsenius, a name which its proposer, Allan Riverstone McCulloch, did not explain but it may be ec-, from ec-qui meaning "really"; senio, which means "six each", which would be an allusion to the lateral row of 6-7 small, sharp, slender, and pointed teeth running backwards on the mandible, these being regarded as the main distinguishing character of this genus. The specific name, pulcher, means "beautiful", a reference to the colour and pattern of the holotype.

== Description ==
Ecsenius pulcher has an elongated body which reaches a total length of 11 cm (4.3 in). It has a blunt head with an inferior mouth and tentacles on the front nostrils.This species has a uniform dark body with some specimens showing a lighter colour towards the tail with contrasting dark bars. The Gulf blennty occurs in three colour phases, a uniform phase, a banded phase and a bicoloured phase. The uniform phase is a uniform dark brownish purple with indistinct, slender yellow marks at the one and three o'clock positions on the margin of the orbit and a bright yellow ring around the pupil. The banded phase is phase is similar in colour and pattern to the uniform phase but the pigmentless areas surrounding the dark bands are bright yellow, this extends onto and covers most of the anal fin, tapering quite far out onto the caudal fin, where the yellow colour changes to vermilion towards the rear. In the bicolour phase the yellow does not change to vermilion towards the rear. There are between 18 and 20 segmented rays in thedorsal fin, typically more tha 18, and 19 to 23 in the anal fin, normally more than 20.

== Distribution and habitat ==
Ecsenius pulcher is found in the western Indian Ocean in the Persian Gulf and the Arabian Sea and has been recorded from the coasts of Oman, Qatar, the United Arab Emirates, eastern Saudi Arbia, Bharain, Kuwait, Iraq, Pakistan and India as far as the Gulf of Kutch. This species is found down to 10 m (33 ft) depth in subtidal habitats such as coastal reefs, lagoons and coral outcrops.

== Biology ==
Ecsenius pulcher is oviparous, they form pairs and lay adhesive eggs. These fishes frequently shelter in crevices in the reef.

== Utilisation ==
Ecsenius pulcher is sometimes found in the aquarium trade.
