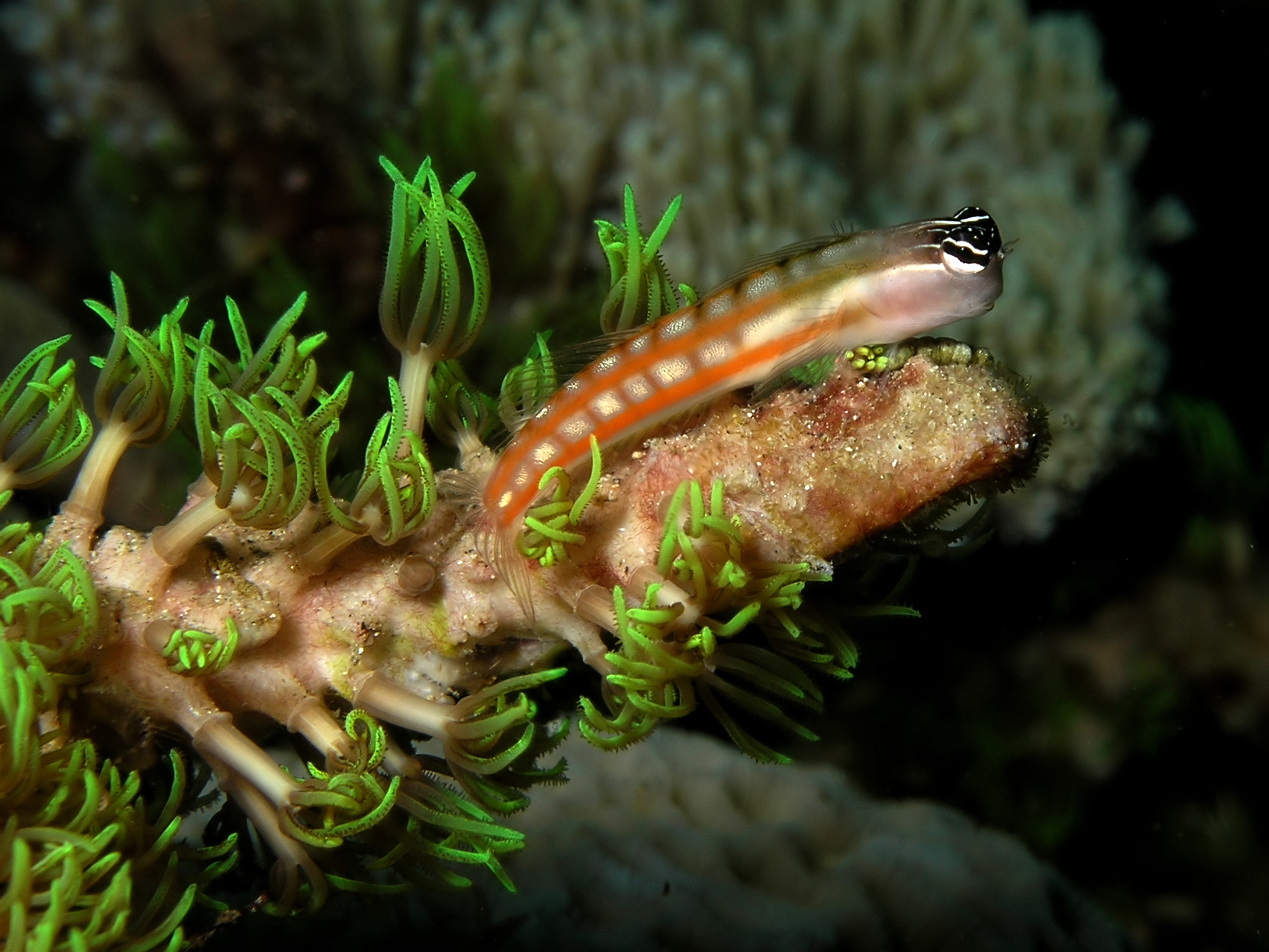
- Ecsenius australianus, Australian Blenny

Scientific classification
- Domain: Eukaryota
- Kingdom: Animalia
- Phylum: Chordata
- Class: Actinopterygii
- Order: Blenniiformes
- Family: Blenniidae
- Subfamily: Salarinae
- Genus: Ecsenius; McCulloch, 1923

Type species
- Ecsenius mandibularis McCulloch, 1923

= Ecsenius =

Genus of fishes

Ecsenius is a large genus of fish in the family Blenniidae. Several species, including Ecsenius midas, the Midas blenny, and Ecsenius bicolor, the bicolor blenny, are commonly sold at aquarium stores as pets.

== Species ==
There are currently 53 recognized species in this genus:

- Ecsenius aequalis V. G. Springer, 1988 (Fourline blenny)
- Ecsenius alleni V. G. Springer, 1988
- Ecsenius aroni V. G. Springer, 1971 (Aron's blenny)
- Ecsenius australianus V. G. Springer, 1988 (Australian blenny)
- Ecsenius axelrodi V. G. Springer, 1988 (Axelrod's clown blenny)
- Ecsenius bandanus V. G. Springer, 1971 (Banda comb-tooth)
- Ecsenius bathi V. G. Springer, 1988 (Bath's comb-tooth)
- Ecsenius bicolor (F. Day, 1888) (Bicolor blenny)
- Ecsenius bimaculatus V. G. Springer, 1971
- Ecsenius caeruliventris V. G. Springer & G. R. Allen, 2004 (Bluebelly blenny)
- Ecsenius collettei V. G. Springer, 1972 (Collete's blenny)
- Ecsenius dentex V. G. Springer, 1988
- Ecsenius dilemma V. G. Springer, 1988
- Ecsenius fijiensis V. G. Springer, 1988
- Ecsenius fourmanoiri V. G. Springer, 1972
- Ecsenius frontalis (Valenciennes, 1836) (Smooth-fin blenny)
- Ecsenius gravieri (Pellegrin, 1906) (Red Sea mimic blenny)
- Ecsenius isos McKinney & V. G. Springer, 1976
- Ecsenius kurti V. G. Springer, 1988
- Ecsenius lineatus Klausewitz, 1962 (Linear blenny)
- Ecsenius lividanalis W. M. Chapman & L. P. Schultz, 1952 (Blue-head combtooth-blenny)
- Ecsenius lubbocki V. G. Springer, 1988 (Lubbock's combtooth-blenny)
- Ecsenius mandibularis McCulloch, 1923 (Queensland blenny)
- Ecsenius melarchus McKinney & V. G. Springer, 1976 (Yellow-eyed comb-tooth)
- Ecsenius midas Starck, 1969 (Persian blenny)
- Ecsenius minutus Klausewitz, 1963
- Ecsenius monoculus V. G. Springer, 1988
- Ecsenius nalolo J. L. B. Smith, 1959 (Nalolo)
- Ecsenius namiyei (D. S. Jordan & Evermann, 1902) (Black comb-tooth)
- Ecsenius niue V. G. Springer, 2002
- Ecsenius oculatus V. G. Springer, 1988
- Ecsenius oculus V. G. Springer, 1971 (Ocular blenny)
- Ecsenius ops V. G. Springer & G. R. Allen, 2001
- Ecsenius opsifrontalis W. M. Chapman & L. P. Schultz, 1952 (Comical blenny)
- Ecsenius pardus V. G. Springer, 1988
- Ecsenius paroculus V. G. Springer, 1988
- Ecsenius pictus McKinney & V. G. Springer, 1976 (White-lined comb-tooth)
- Ecsenius polystictus V. G. Springer & J. E. Randall, 1999
- Ecsenius portenoyi V. G. Springer, 1988
- Ecsenius prooculis W. M. Chapman & L. P. Schultz, 1952
- Ecsenius pulcher (J. A. Murray, 1887)
- Ecsenius randalli V. G. Springer, 1991
- Ecsenius schroederi McKinney & V. G. Springer, 1976
- Ecsenius sellifer V. G. Springer, 1988 (Saddle blenny)
- Ecsenius shirleyae V. G. Springer & G. R. Allen, 2004
- Ecsenius stictus V. G. Springer, 1988 (Great Barrier Reef blenny)
- Ecsenius stigmatura Fowler, 1952
- Ecsenius taeniatus V. G. Springer, 1988
- Ecsenius tessera V. G. Springer, 1988
- Ecsenius tigris V. G. Springer, 1988 (Tiger blenny)
- Ecsenius tricolor V. G. Springer & G. R. Allen, 2001
- Ecsenius trilineatus V. G. Springer, 1972 (Three-lined blenny)
- Ecsenius yaeyamaensis (Aoyagi, 1954) (Yaeyama blenny)
