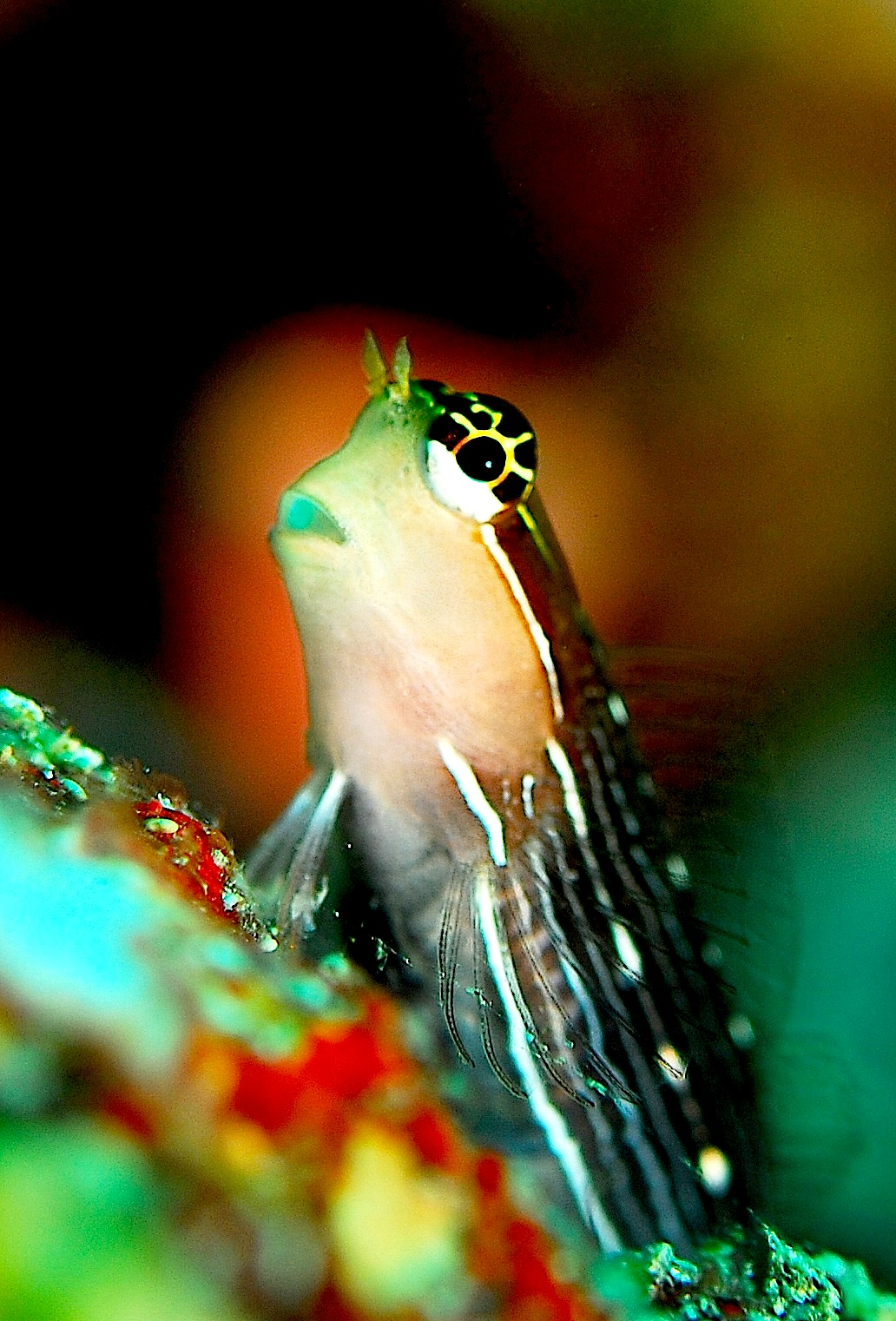

Conservation status
- Least Concern (IUCN 3.1)

Scientific classification
- Kingdom: Animalia
- Phylum: Chordata
- Class: Actinopterygii
- Order: Blenniiformes
- Family: Blenniidae
- Genus: Ecsenius
- Species: E. pictus

Binomial name
- Ecsenius pictus McKinney & V. G. Springer, 1976

= Ecsenius pictus =

Species of fish

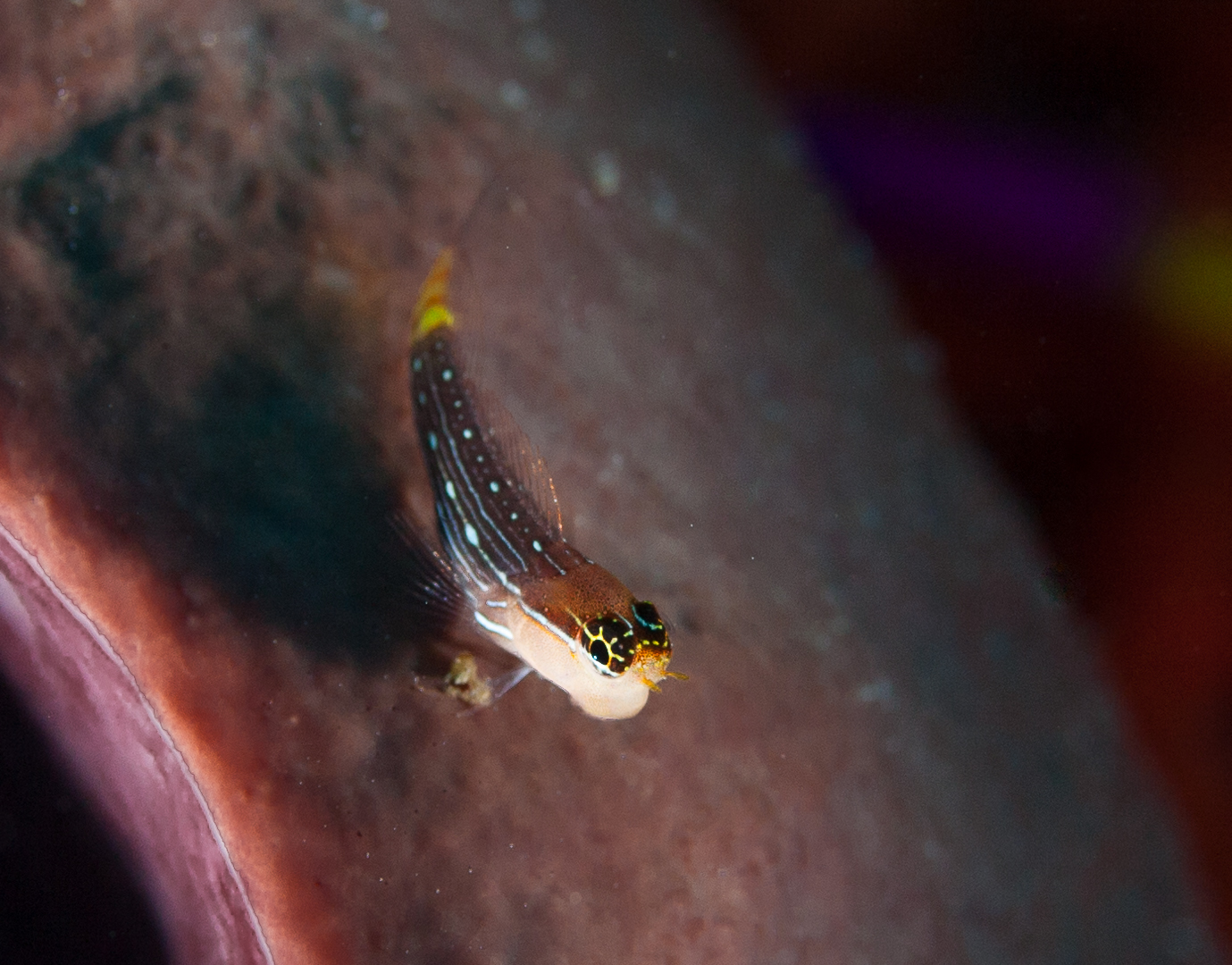
Ecsenius pictus at Waitii bay, Wakatobi National Park, 2015

Ecsenius pictus, known commonly as the white-lined comb-tooth in Indonesia and the pictus blenny in Micronesia, is a species of combtooth blenny family Blenniidae.

The white-lined comb-tooth is found in coral reefs in the central Indo-Pacific area and especially in Indonesia, Philippines and Solomon Islands.

It can reach a maximum length of 5 cm.

Blennies in this species feed primarily off of plants, including benthic algae and weeds, and are commercial aquarium fish. The specific name "pictus" means "painted" in Latin, and refers to the species' unusual colour pattern.
