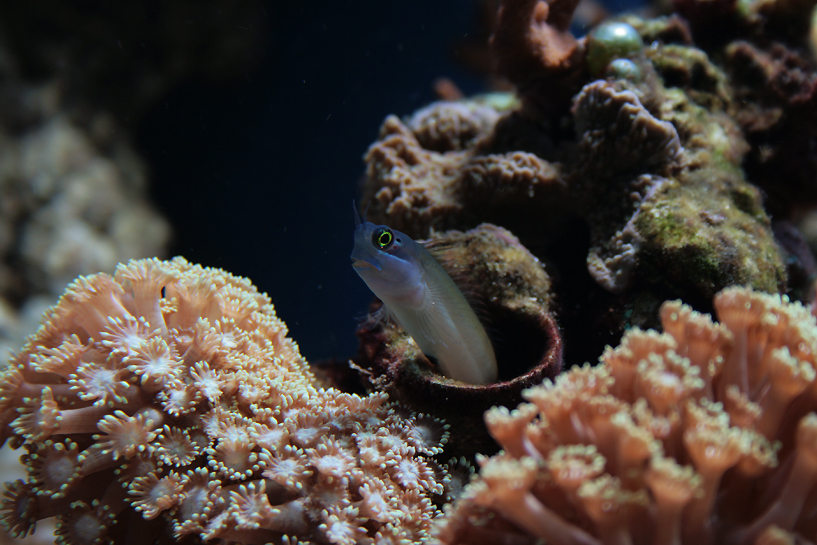
- Escenius melarchus seeking shelter

Conservation status
- Least Concern (IUCN 3.1)

Scientific classification
- Kingdom: Animalia
- Phylum: Chordata
- Class: Actinopterygii
- Order: Blenniiformes
- Family: Blenniidae
- Genus: Ecsenius
- Species: E. melarchus

Binomial name
- Ecsenius melarchus McKinney & V. G. Springer, 1976

= Ecsenius melarchus =

Species of fish

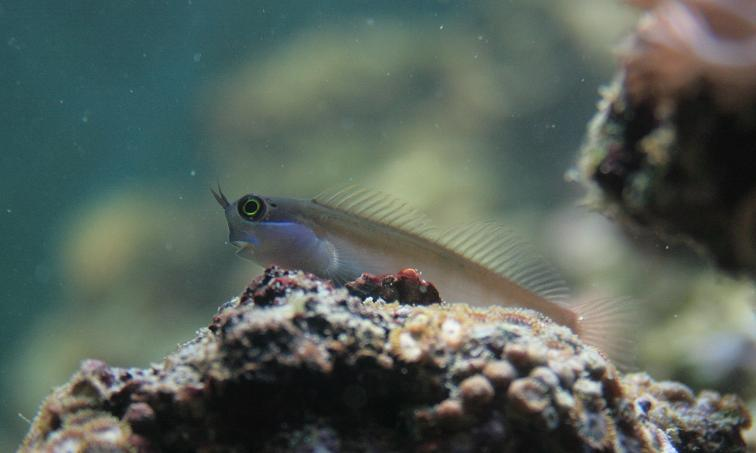
Escenius melarchus resting

Ecsenius melarchus, known commonly as the yellow-eyed comb-tooth or the Java combtooth-blenny in Indonesia, is a species of combtooth blenny in the genus Ecsenius. It is found in coral reefs in the western Pacific ocean. It can reach a maximum length of 5 centimetres. Blennies in this species primarily feed off of plants, including benthic algae and weeds, and are commercial aquarium fish. The specific name "melarchus" is Latin for "black anus", and refers to the black anal marking on the blennies in this species.
