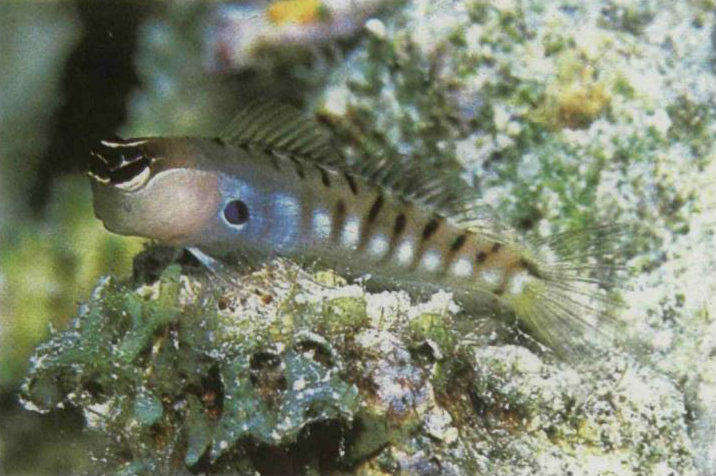

Conservation status
- Least Concern (IUCN 3.1)

Scientific classification
- Kingdom: Animalia
- Phylum: Chordata
- Class: Actinopterygii
- Order: Blenniiformes
- Family: Blenniidae
- Genus: Ecsenius
- Species: E. alleni

Binomial name
- Ecsenius alleni V. G. Springer, 1988

= Ecsenius alleni =

Species of fish

Ecsenius alleni, known commonly as the Allen's blenny, is a species of combtooth blenny in the genus Ecsenius. It is found in coral reefs in the eastern Indian Ocean, specifically in western Australia. It can reach a maximum length of 3.4 centimetres. The blennies feed primarily off of plants and algae. The specific name honours the ichthyologist Gerald R. Allen.
