= Ecsenius dilemma =

Conservation status
- Least Concern (IUCN 3.1)

Scientific classification
- Kingdom: Animalia
- Phylum: Chordata
- Class: Actinopterygii
- Order: Blenniiformes
- Family: Blenniidae
- Genus: Ecsenius
- Species: E. dilemma

Binomial name
- Ecsenius dilemma V. G. Springer, 1988

Species of fish

Ecsenius dilemma, the twocoat coralblenny, is a species of combtooth blenny in the genus Ecsenius. It is found in coral reefs in the western Pacific ocean, specifically in the Philippines. It can reach a maximum length of 3.1 centimetres. Blennies in this species feed primarily off of benthic algae and weeds, and are commercial aquarium fish.
