= Ecsenius collettei =

Conservation status
- Least Concern (IUCN 3.1)

Scientific classification
- Kingdom: Animalia
- Phylum: Chordata
- Class: Actinopterygii
- Order: Blenniiformes
- Family: Blenniidae
- Genus: Ecsenius
- Species: E. collettei

Binomial name
- Ecsenius collettei V. G. Springer, 1972

Species of fish

Ecsenius collettei, known commonly as the Collete's blenny in Papua New Guinea, is a species of combtooth blenny in the genus Ecsenius. It is found in coral reefs in the western central Pacific ocean, specifically in Papua New Guinea. It can reach a maximum length of 5 centimetres. The blennies feed primarily off of plants, and benthic algae and weeds. he specific name honours Bruce B. Collette the Director of the National Marine Fisheries Service Systematics Laboratory, whose collection of fish specimens from New Guinea contained a number important blenniid specimens, one of which was this species.
