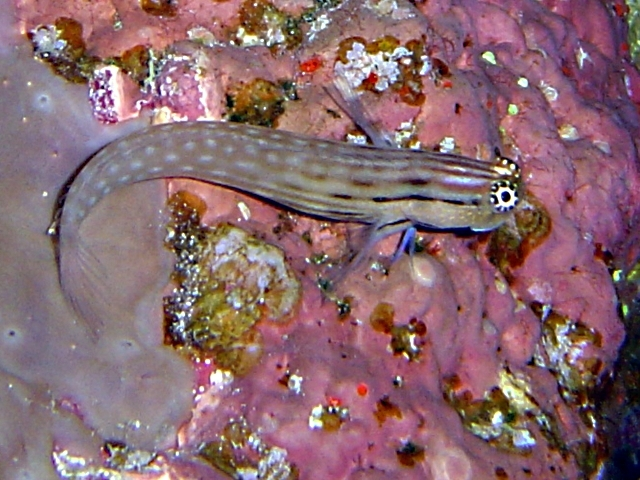

Conservation status
- Least Concern (IUCN 3.1)

Scientific classification
- Kingdom: Animalia
- Phylum: Chordata
- Class: Actinopterygii
- Order: Blenniiformes
- Family: Blenniidae
- Genus: Ecsenius
- Species: E. dentex

Binomial name
- Ecsenius dentex V. G. Springer, 1988

= Ecsenius dentex =

Species of fish

Ecsenius dentex is a species of combtooth blenny in the genus Ecsenius. It is found in the western Indian Ocean, and is endemic to the gulfs of Aqaba, Suez, and the northwestern Red Sea. It can reach a maximum length of 4.8 centimetres. The blenny feeds primarily off of benthic algae and weeds.
