= Ecsenius oculatus =

Conservation status
- Least Concern (IUCN 3.1)

Scientific classification
- Kingdom: Animalia
- Phylum: Chordata
- Class: Actinopterygii
- Order: Blenniiformes
- Family: Blenniidae
- Genus: Ecsenius
- Species: E. oculatus

Binomial name
- Ecsenius oculatus V. G. Springer, 1988

Species of fish

Ecsenius oculatus, the ocular coralblenny, is a species of combtooth blenny in the genus Ecsenius. It is found in coral reefs in the western Indian Ocean. It can reach a maximum length of 4.7 centimetres. Blennies in this species feed primarily off of plants, including benthic algae and weeds.
