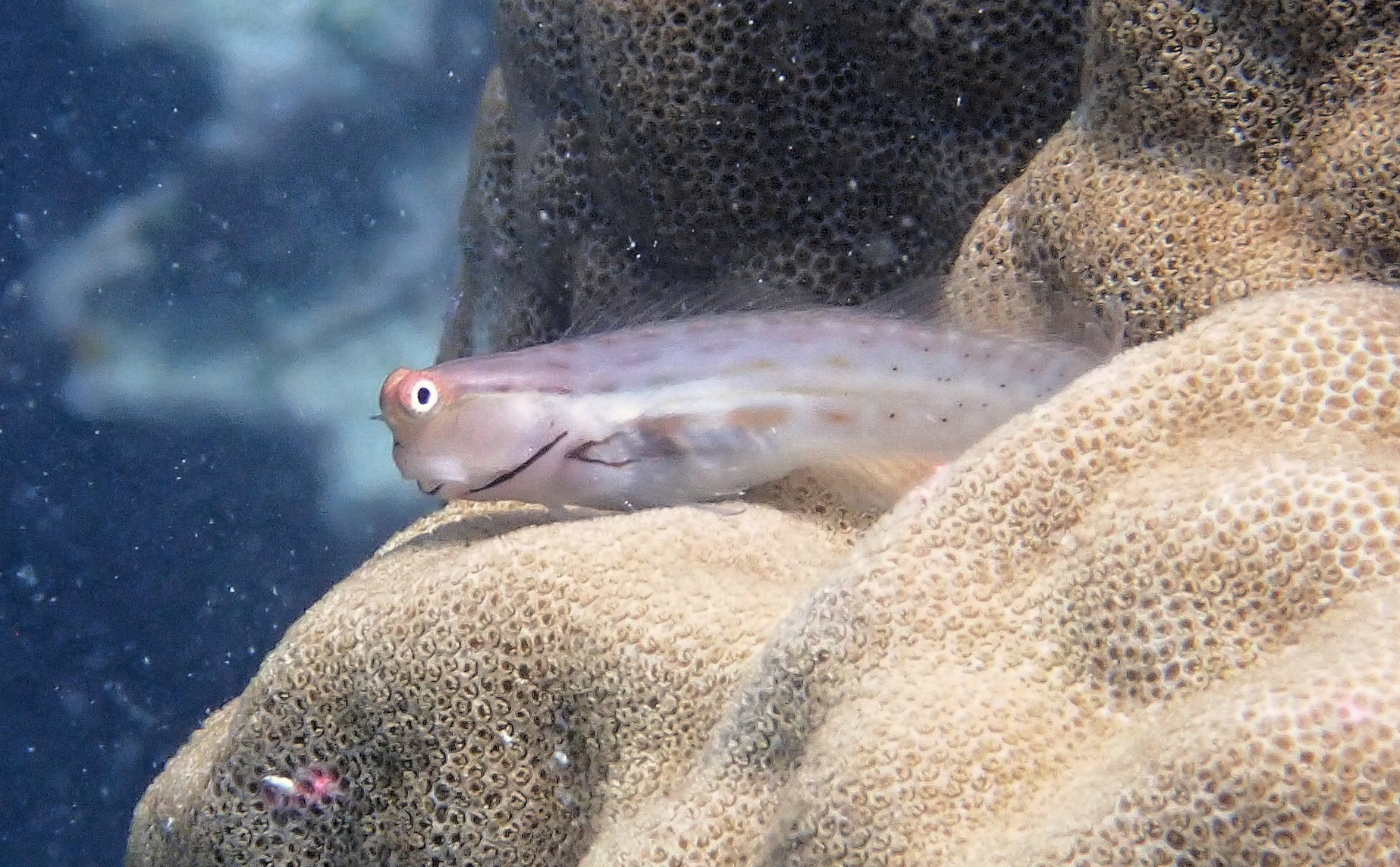

Conservation status
- Least Concern (IUCN 3.1)

Scientific classification
- Kingdom: Animalia
- Phylum: Chordata
- Class: Actinopterygii
- Order: Blenniiformes
- Family: Blenniidae
- Genus: Ecsenius
- Species: E. stictus

Binomial name
- Ecsenius stictus V. G. Springer, 1988

= Ecsenius stictus =

Species of fish

Ecsenius stictus, known commonly as the Great Barrier Reef blenny, is a species of combtooth blenny in the genus Ecsenius. It is found in the Great Barrier Reef, and around the Chesterfield Islands. It can reach a maximum length of 5.8 centimetres. Blennies in this species feed primarily off of plants, including benthic algae and weeds.
