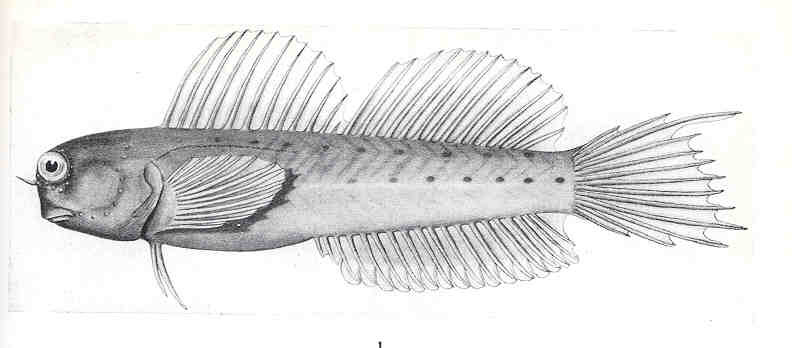

Conservation status
- Least Concern (IUCN 3.1)

Scientific classification
- Kingdom: Animalia
- Phylum: Chordata
- Class: Actinopterygii
- Order: Blenniiformes
- Family: Blenniidae
- Genus: Ecsenius
- Species: E. mandibularis

Binomial name
- Ecsenius mandibularis McCulloch, 1923

= Ecsenius mandibularis =

Species of fish

Ecsenius mandibularis, also known as the many-toothed blenny, Queensland combtooth blenny or Queensland blenny in Australia, is a species of combtooth blenny in the genus Ecsenius. It is found in coral reefs in the western Pacific ocean, including the southern edge of the Great Barrier Reef. It can reach a maximum length of 7.5 centimetres. Blennies in this species feed primarily off of plants, including benthic algae and weeds.
