= Ecsenius ops =

Conservation status
- Least Concern (IUCN 3.1)

Scientific classification
- Kingdom: Animalia
- Phylum: Chordata
- Class: Actinopterygii
- Order: Blenniiformes
- Family: Blenniidae
- Genus: Ecsenius
- Species: E. ops

Binomial name
- Ecsenius ops V. G. Springer & G. R. Allen, 2001

Species of fish

Ecsenius ops, known commonly as the eye-spot blenny or the yellow-eye combtooth-blenny in Indonesia, is a species of combtooth blenny the family Blenniidae.

It is found in the central Indo-Pacific area, specifically around Indonesia.

It can reach a maximum length of 5.5 centimetres.

Blennies in this species feed primarily off of plants, including benthic algae and weeds.
