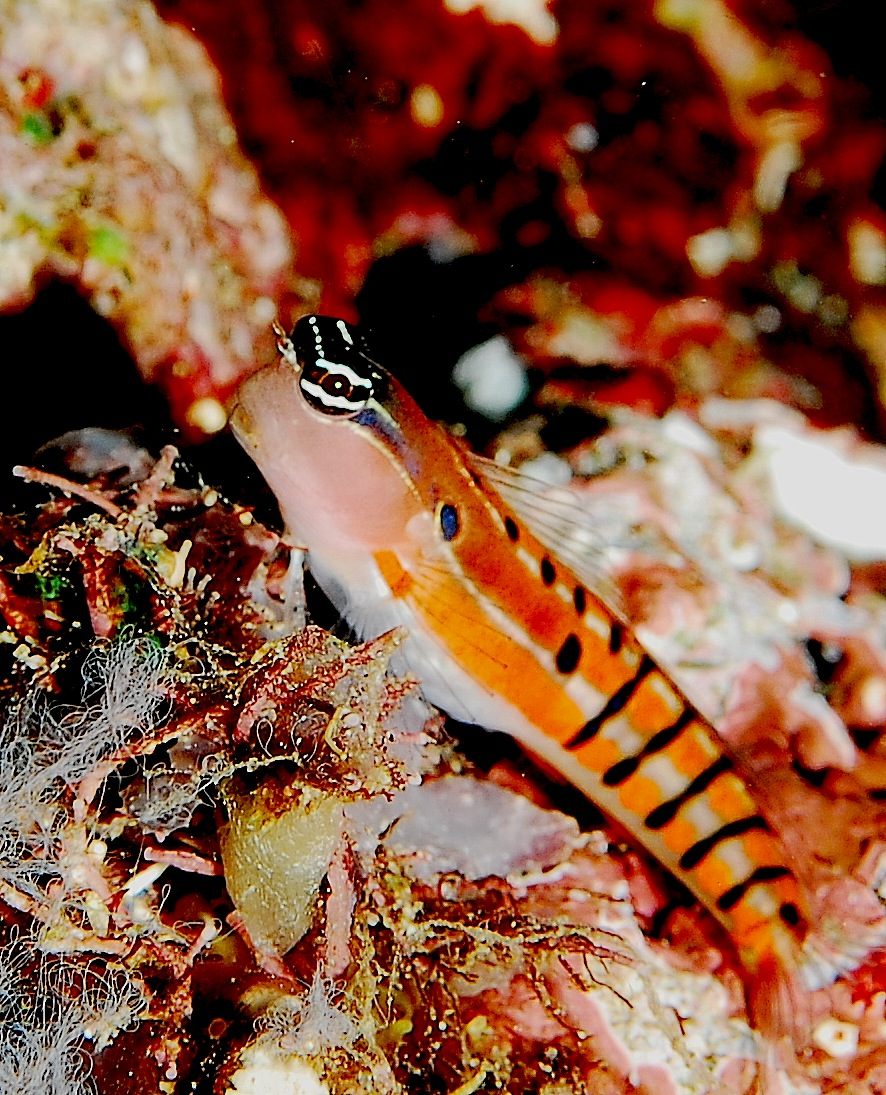

Conservation status
- Least Concern (IUCN 3.1)

Scientific classification
- Kingdom: Animalia
- Phylum: Chordata
- Class: Actinopterygii
- Order: Blenniiformes
- Family: Blenniidae
- Genus: Ecsenius
- Species: E. axelrodi

Binomial name
- Ecsenius axelrodi V. G. Springer, 1988

= Ecsenius axelrodi =

Species of fish

Ecsenius axelrodi, known commonly as the Axelrod's clown blenny or the Axelrod's combtooth blenny, is a species of ray-finned fish in the family Blenniidae, the combtooth blennies. It is found in shallow water on coral reefs in the western central Pacific Ocean. It was first described by Victor Gruschka Springer in 1988 and named in honour of the American ichthyologist Herbert Richard Axelrod.

== Description ==
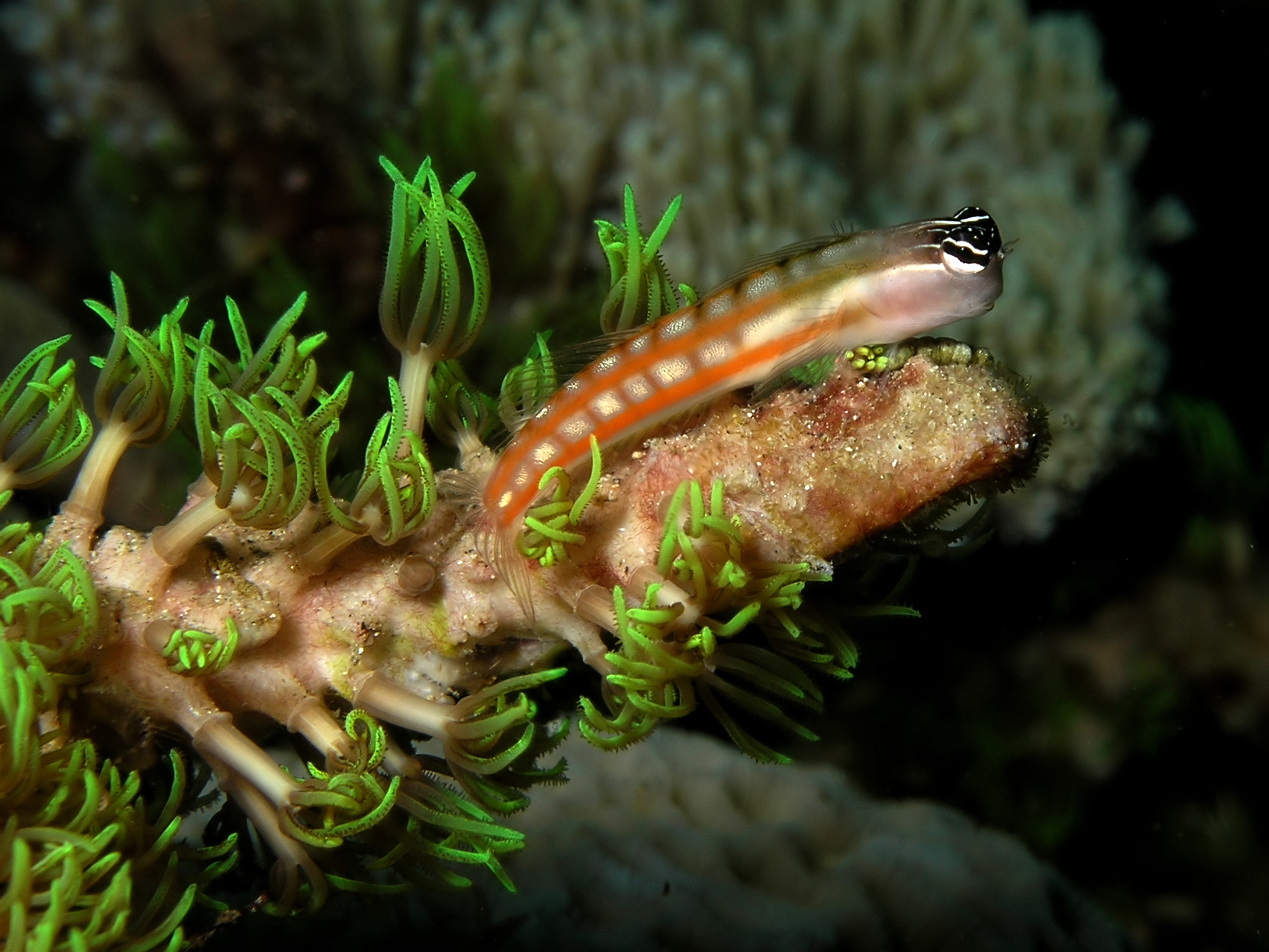
Axelrod's clown blenny

Ecsenius axelrodi is a small species growing to a maximum length of 5.8 cm (2.3 in). The dorsal fin has 12 spines and 12 to 14 soft rays. It is deeply notched between the two portions of fin. The anal fin has 2 spines and 14 to 16 soft rays. This combtooth blenny is variable in colour but usually has broad orange bands running along the body and transverse black bars on the rear half of the body. It occasionally has black longitudinal stripes. The eyes are prominent and have a black line running through them. This fish can be distinguished from other similar species by the obliquely-sloping, oblong black spot just above the insertion of the pectoral fin, and the four of five round black spots just below the spinous dorsal fin.

== Distribution and habitat ==
Ecsenius axelrodi is native to the western central Pacific Ocean. Its range includes the Admiralty Islands, Papua New Guinea and the Solomon Islands. It occurs on coral reefs on outer reef crests and slopes at depths of down to 15 m (49 ft). Both adults and juveniles are restricted to subtidal areas with live corals.

== Biology ==
The breeding habits and early life history of Ecsenius axelrodi has been little studied. The females are oviparous and there is a planktonic larval stage but the smallest identifiable juveniles found are over 10 mm (0.4 in) long and look like miniature adults.

== Bibliography ==
- Fenner, Robert M.: The Conscientious Marine Aquarist. Neptune City, New Jersey, United States of America: T.F.H. Publications, 2001.
- Helfman, G., B. Collette y D. Facey: The diversity of fishes. Blackwell Science, Malden, Massachusetts, United States of America, 1997.
- Hoese, D.F. 1986:. A M.M. Smith y P.C. Heemstra (eds.) Smiths' sea fishes. Springer-Verlag, Berlín, Alemania.
- Moyle, P. y J. Cech.: Fishes: An Introduction to Ichthyology, 4a. edición, Upper Saddle River, New Jersey, United States of America: Prentice-Hall. Año 2000.
- Nelson, J.: Fishes of the World, 3a. edición. New York, United States of America: John Wiley and Sons. Año 1994.
- Wheeler, A.: The World Encyclopedia of Fishes, 2a. edición, London: Macdonald. Año 1985.
