= Ecsenius kurti =

Conservation status
- Vulnerable (IUCN 3.1)

Scientific classification
- Kingdom: Animalia
- Phylum: Chordata
- Class: Actinopterygii
- Order: Blenniiformes
- Family: Blenniidae
- Genus: Ecsenius
- Species: E. kurti

Binomial name
- Ecsenius kurti V. G. Springer, 1988

Species of fish

Ecsenius kurti, Kurt's coralblenny, is a species of combtooth blenny in the genus Ecsenius. It is found in coral reefs in the western Pacific ocean; it is endemic to the Cuyo Islands of the Philippines. It can reach a maximum length of 3.5 centimetres. Blennies in this species feed primarily off of plants, including benthic algae and weeds. The specific name honours Kurt A. Bruwelheide, who was a museum specialist in the Division of Fishes of the National Museum of Natural History (Washington, D.C.), for his work on the early part Springer's revision of the genus Ecsenius and who photographed many of the types of the species Springer described.
