= E. lineatus =

E. lineatus may refer to:

- Ecsenius lineatus, a blenny species from the Indo-West Pacific
- Euthynnus lineatus, the black skipjack, a fish species

== See also ==
- Lineatus
