= Ecsenius shirleyae =

Conservation status
- Least Concern (IUCN 3.1)

Scientific classification
- Kingdom: Animalia
- Phylum: Chordata
- Class: Actinopterygii
- Order: Blenniiformes
- Family: Blenniidae
- Genus: Ecsenius
- Species: E. shirleyae

Binomial name
- Ecsenius shirleyae V. G. Springer & G. R. Allen, 2004

Species of fish

Ecsenius shirleyae, known commonly as the Shirley's blenny in Indonesia, is a species of combtooth blenny in the genus Ecsenius It is found in the western Pacific ocean, specifically in Indonesia. It can reach a maximum length of 2.8 centimetres. The species was named in honour of Springer's wife, Shirley. It is considered most similar to its sister species E. bimaculatus.
