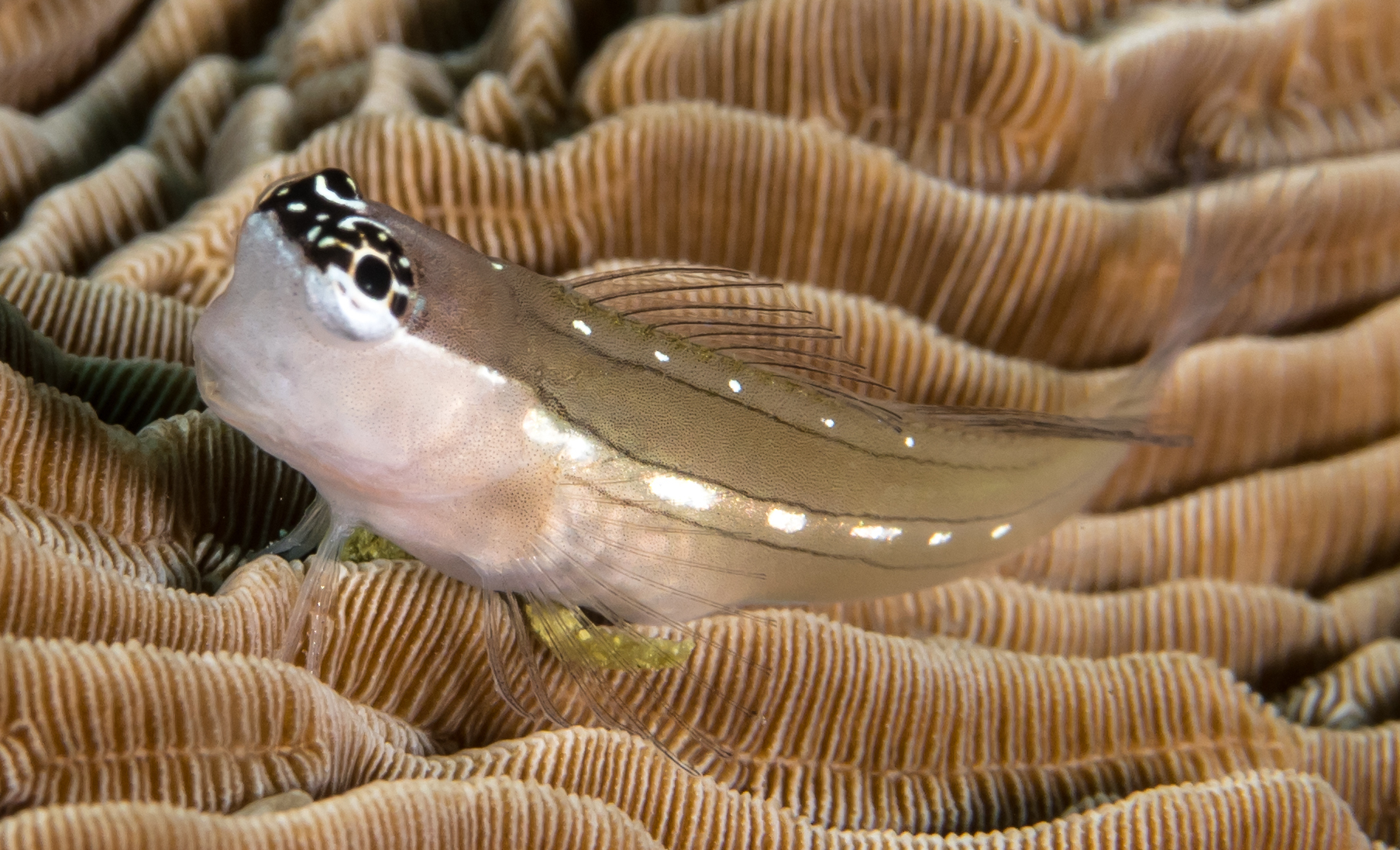

Conservation status
- Least Concern (IUCN 3.1)

Scientific classification
- Kingdom: Animalia
- Phylum: Chordata
- Class: Actinopterygii
- Order: Blenniiformes
- Family: Blenniidae
- Genus: Ecsenius
- Species: E. schroederi

Binomial name
- Ecsenius schroederi McKinney & V. G. Springer, 1976

= Ecsenius schroederi =

Species of fish

Ecsenius schroederi, known commonly as the Schroeder's combtooth-blenny in Indonesia, is a species of combtooth blenny in the genus Ecsenius. It is found in coral reefs in the western Pacific ocean, specifically in Indonesia. It can reach a maximum length of 7 centimetres. Blennies in this species feed primarily off of plants, including benthic algae and weeds, and are commercial aquarium fish. The species was named in honour of the wildlife artist and scientific illustrator Jack R. Schroeder (1954–2004).
