= Ecsenius randalli =

Conservation status
- Vulnerable (IUCN 3.1)

Scientific classification
- Kingdom: Animalia
- Phylum: Chordata
- Class: Actinopterygii
- Order: Blenniiformes
- Family: Blenniidae
- Genus: Ecsenius
- Species: E. randalli

Binomial name
- Ecsenius randalli V. G. Springer, 1991

Species of fish

Ecsenius randalli is a species of combtooth blenny in the genus Ecsenius. It is found the western central Pacific ocean, around Indonesia. It can reach a maximum length of 2 centimetres. Blennies in this species feed primarily off of plants, including benthic algae and weeds. The specific name of this blenny honours the American ichthyologist John E. Randall of the Bishop Museum in Honolulu, who collected the type, photographed it and permitted Victor G. Springer to describe it.
