= Ecsenius oculus =

Conservation status
- Least Concern (IUCN 3.1)

Scientific classification
- Kingdom: Animalia
- Phylum: Chordata
- Class: Actinopterygii
- Order: Blenniiformes
- Family: Blenniidae
- Genus: Ecsenius
- Species: E. oculus

Binomial name
- Ecsenius oculus V. G. Springer, 1971

Species of fish

Ecsenius oculus, known commonly in Micronesia as the ocular blenny and as the coral blenny on Christmas Island, is a species of combtooth blenny in the genus Ecsenius. It is found in coral reefs in the western Pacific ocean. It can reach a maximum length of 7 centimetres. Blennies in this species feed primarily off of plants, including benthic algae and weeds, and are commercial aquarium fish.
