= E. tricolor =

E. tricolor may refer to:

- Ecsenius tricolor, the Derawan combtooth-blenny, a fish species found in the western central Pacific Ocean, around the Philippines and Borneo
- Egretta tricolor, the tricolored heron or Louisiana heron, a bird species found from the Gulf states of the United States and northern Mexico south through Central America and the Caribbean to central Brazil and Peru
- Epipedobates tricolor, the phantasmal poison frog, a frog species found in Ecuador
- Epthianura tricolor, the crimson chat, a bird species found in Australia
- Erythrura tricolor, the tricoloured parrotfinch, a bird species found in Indonesia and East Timor

== See also ==
- Tricolor (disambiguation)
