= Ecsenius isos =

Conservation status
- Least Concern (IUCN 3.1)

Scientific classification
- Kingdom: Animalia
- Phylum: Chordata
- Class: Actinopterygii
- Order: Blenniiformes
- Family: Blenniidae
- Genus: Ecsenius
- Species: E. isos

Binomial name
- Ecsenius isos McKinney & V. G. Springer, 1976

Species of fish

Ecsenius isos is a species of combtooth blenny in the genus Ecsenius. It is found in coral reefs in the western central Pacific ocean, around New Hebrides and New Caledonia. It can reach a maximum length of 3.2 centimetres. Blennies in this species primarily feed off of plants, including benthic algae and weeds. The specific name isos refers to the dark spots beneath the blennies' heads.
