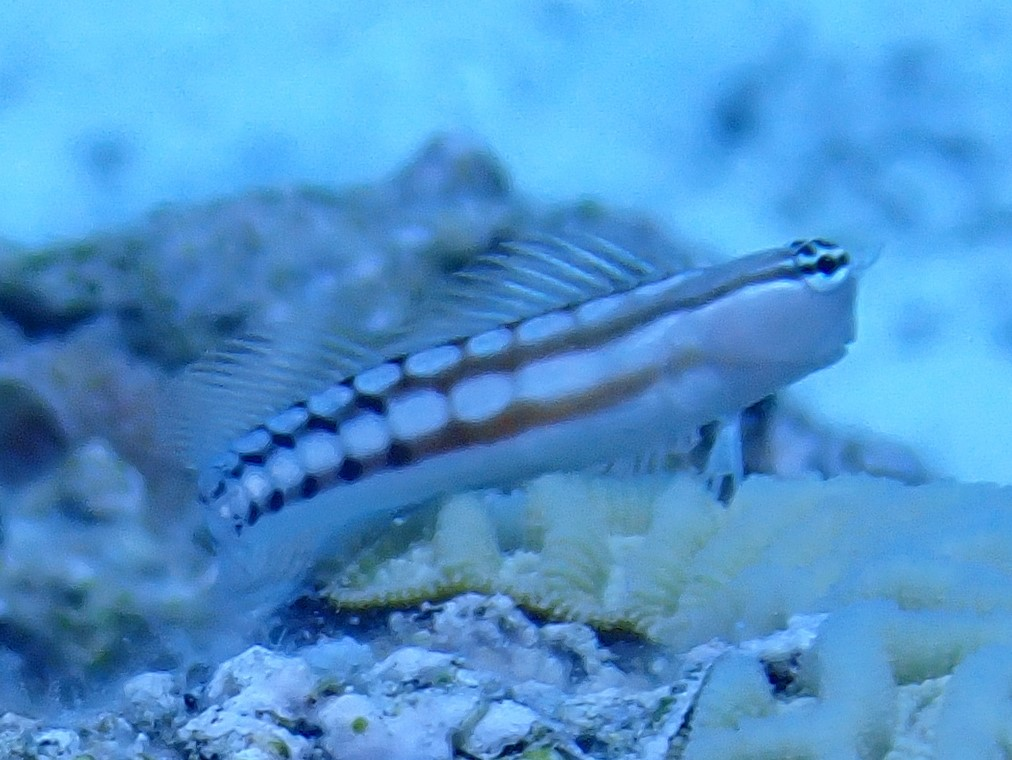

Conservation status
- Least Concern (IUCN 3.1)

Scientific classification
- Kingdom: Animalia
- Phylum: Chordata
- Class: Actinopterygii
- Order: Blenniiformes
- Family: Blenniidae
- Genus: Ecsenius
- Species: E. niue

Binomial name
- Ecsenius niue V. G. Springer, 2002

= Ecsenius niue =

Species of fish

Ecsenius niue is a species of combtooth blenny. It is found in coral reefs around Niue Island, in the eastern central Pacific Ocean. It can reach a maximum length of 3.1 centimetres. Ecsenius niue feeds primarily off of plants, including benthic algae and weeds. The specific name refers to Niue Island, so far the only location from which E. niue is known.
