= Ecsenius lubbocki =

Conservation status
- Least Concern (IUCN 3.1)

Scientific classification
- Kingdom: Animalia
- Phylum: Chordata
- Class: Actinopterygii
- Order: Blenniiformes
- Family: Blenniidae
- Genus: Ecsenius
- Species: E. lubbocki

Binomial name
- Ecsenius lubbocki V. G. Springer, 1988

Species of fish

Ecsenius lubbocki, the Lubbock's combtooth-blenny, is a species of combtooth blenny in the genus Ecsenius. It is found in coral reefs in Phuket, Thailand, in the eastern Indian Ocean. It can reach a maximum length of 4 centimetres. Blennies in this species feed primarily off of plants, including benthic algae and weeds. The specific name honours the English marine biologist Hugh Roger Lubbock (1951–1981), the collector of the type specimens, he recognised that they were a new species of Ecsenius.
