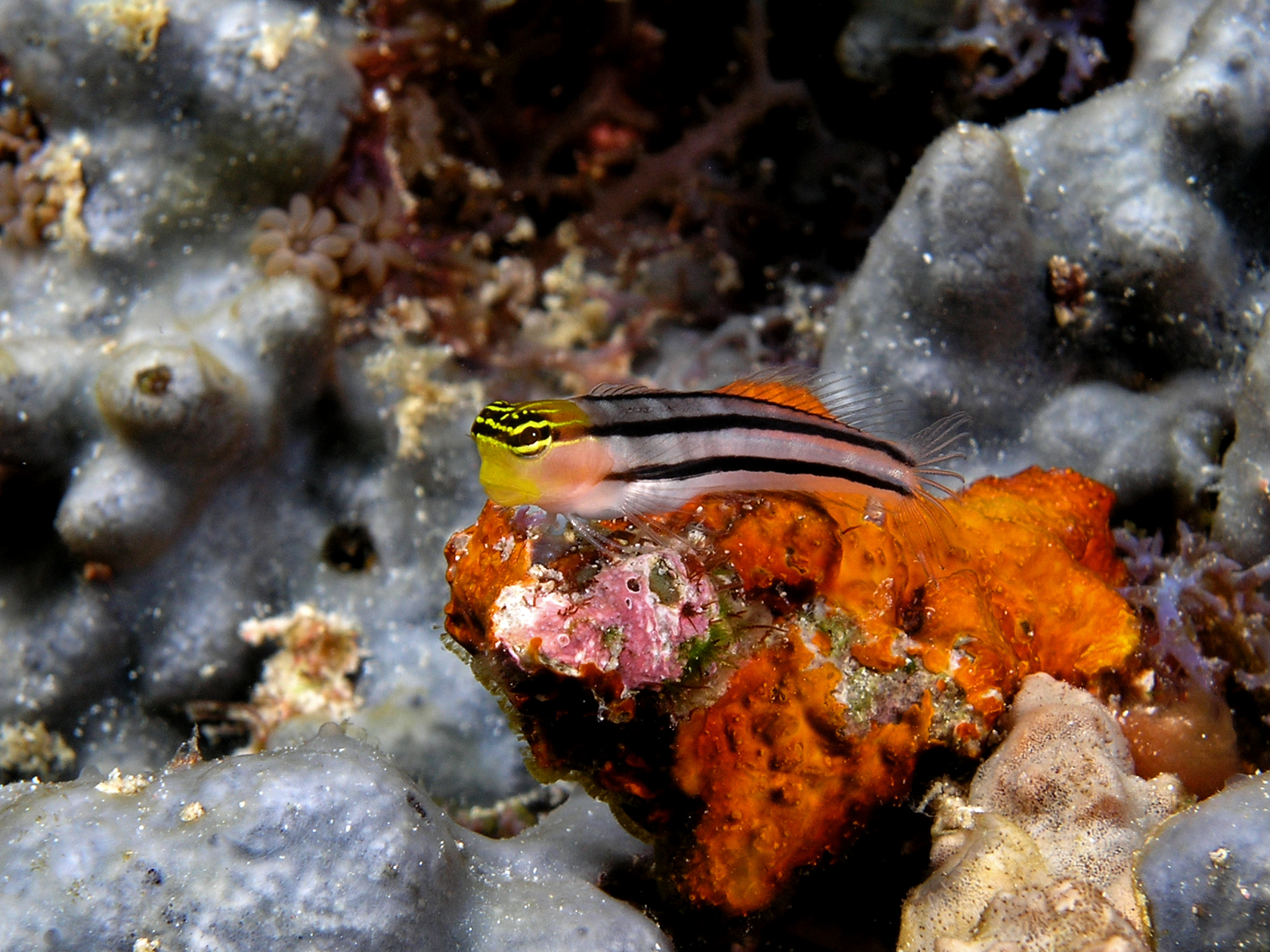

Conservation status
- Least Concern (IUCN 3.1)

Scientific classification
- Kingdom: Animalia
- Phylum: Chordata
- Class: Actinopterygii
- Order: Blenniiformes
- Family: Blenniidae
- Genus: Ecsenius
- Species: E. bathi

Binomial name
- Ecsenius bathi V. G. Springer, 1988

= Ecsenius bathi =

Species of fish

Ecsenius bathi, known commonly as the Bath's comb-tooth, is a species of combtooth blenny found in coral reefs in the western central Pacific ocean. The specific name honours the German ichthyologist Hans Bath (1924-2015) who was a notable worker on blennies and who brought this species to Springer's attention and allowed him to describe it.
