= Ecsenius tigris =

Conservation status
- Vulnerable (IUCN 3.1)

Scientific classification
- Kingdom: Animalia
- Phylum: Chordata
- Class: Actinopterygii
- Order: Blenniiformes
- Family: Blenniidae
- Genus: Ecsenius
- Species: E. tigris

Binomial name
- Ecsenius tigris V. G. Springer, 1988

Species of fish

Ecsenius tigris, known commonly as the tiger blenny in Australia, is a species of combtooth blenny in the genus Ecsenius. It is found in the western Pacific ocean, specifically the western Coral Sea. It can reach a maximum length of 5 centimetres. Blennies in this species feed primarily off of plants, including benthic algae and weeds, and are commercial aquarium fish.
