= Ecsenius polystictus =

Conservation status
- Least Concern (IUCN 3.1)

Scientific classification
- Kingdom: Animalia
- Phylum: Chordata
- Class: Actinopterygii
- Order: Blenniiformes
- Family: Blenniidae
- Genus: Ecsenius
- Species: E. polystictus

Binomial name
- Ecsenius polystictus V. G. Springer & J. E. Randall, 1999

Species of fish

Ecsenius polystictus, known commonly as the dotted coralblenny or Andaman combtooth-blenny, is a species of combtooth blenny in the genus Ecsenius. It is found in the eastern Indian Ocean, around Indonesia. It can reach a maximum length of 4 centimetres. Blennies in this species feed primarily off of plants, including benthic algae and weeds.
