= Ecsenius aequalis =

Conservation status
- Least Concern (IUCN 3.1)

Scientific classification
- Kingdom: Animalia
- Phylum: Chordata
- Class: Actinopterygii
- Order: Blenniiformes
- Family: Blenniidae
- Genus: Ecsenius
- Species: E. aequalis

Binomial name
- Ecsenius aequalis V. G. Springer, 1988

Species of fish

Ecsenius aequalis, a fish known commonly as the fourline blenny, is a species of combtooth blenny found in coral reefs in the western Pacific Ocean. It is grey or light brown in color, with four think black stripes or dotted lines along its body, including a line along the base of the dorsal fin. Other names for Ecsenius aequalis are fourline combtooth blenny and fourline coral blenny.
