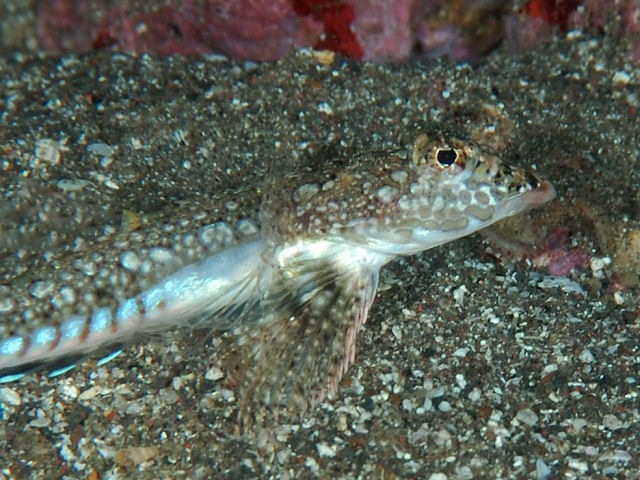
- Callionymus izuensis

Scientific classification
- Domain: Eukaryota
- Kingdom: Animalia
- Phylum: Chordata
- Class: Actinopterygii
- Order: Callionymiformes
- Family: Callionymidae
- Genus: Callionymus
- Subgenus: Calliurichthys; D. S. Jordan & Fowler, 1903

Type species
- Callionymus japonicus Houttuyn, 1782

= Calliurichthys =

Subgenus of fishes

Calliurichthys is a subgenus of Callionymus, a genus dragonets, native to the western Pacific Ocean. Some authorities consider it to be a valid genus.

== Species ==
There are currently two recognized species in this subgenus:

- Callionymus izuensis (R. Fricke & Zaiser Brownell, 1993)
- Callionymus scaber (McCulloch, 1926)
