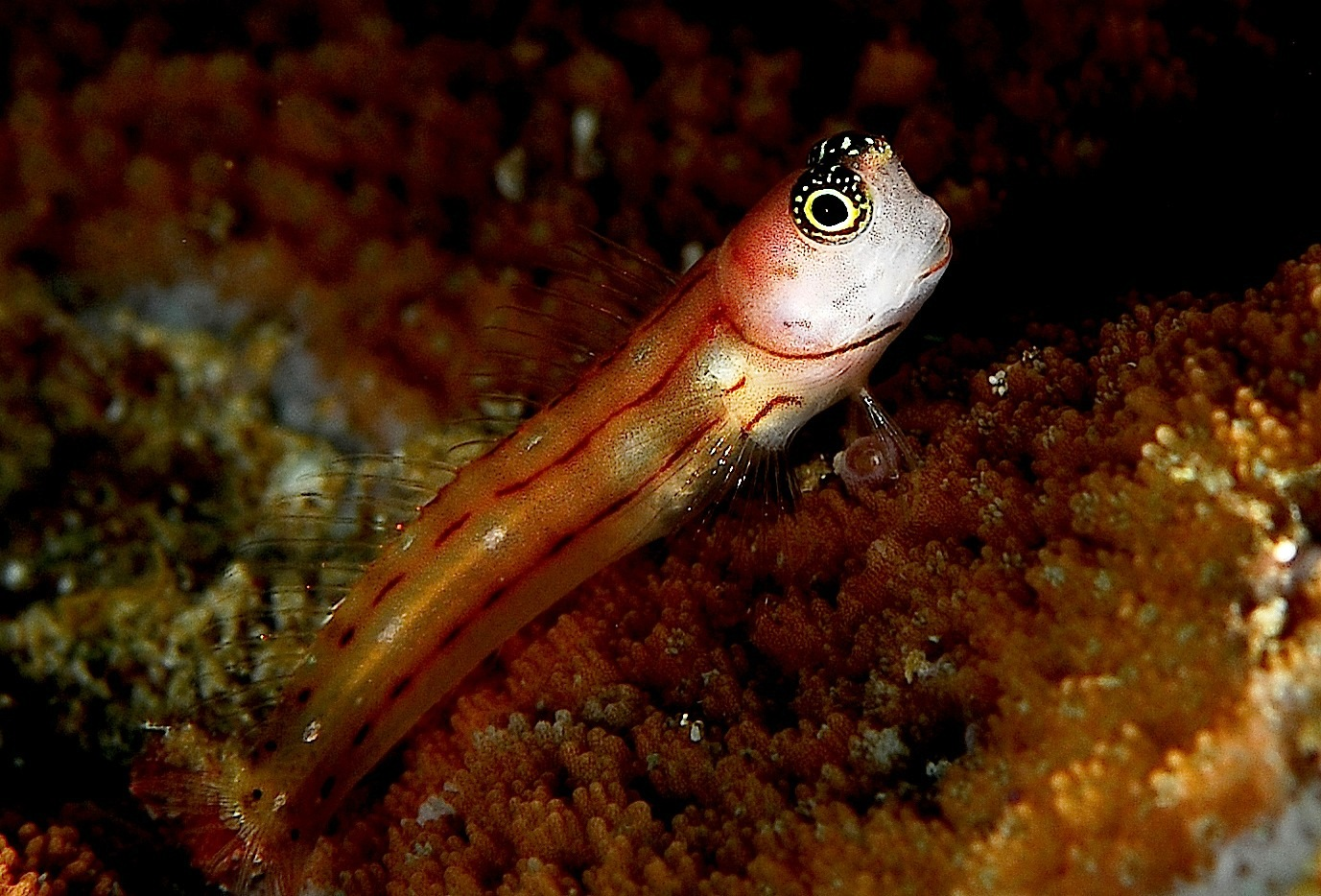

Conservation status
- Least Concern (IUCN 3.1)

Scientific classification
- Kingdom: Animalia
- Phylum: Chordata
- Class: Actinopterygii
- Order: Blenniiformes
- Family: Blenniidae
- Genus: Ecsenius
- Species: E. trilineatus

Binomial name
- Ecsenius trilineatus V. G. Springer, 1972

= Ecsenius trilineatus =

Species of fish

Ecsenius trilineatus, known commonly as the three-lined blenny in Australia, and the white-spotted comb-tooth or the white-spotted combtooth blenny in Indonesia, is a species of combtooth blenny in the genus Ecsenius. It is a non-migoratory species of blenny found in coral reefs in the western central Pacific ocean. It can reach a maximum length of 3 centimetres. Blennies in this species feed primarily off of plants, including benthic algae and weeds, and are commercial aquarium fish, but of no interest in fisheries.
