= Ecsenius taeniatus =

Conservation status
- Least Concern (IUCN 3.1)

Scientific classification
- Kingdom: Animalia
- Phylum: Chordata
- Class: Actinopterygii
- Order: Blenniiformes
- Family: Blenniidae
- Genus: Ecsenius
- Species: E. taeniatus

Binomial name
- Ecsenius taeniatus V. G. Springer, 1988

Species of fish

Ecsenius taeniatus, the white-lined coralblenny, is a species of combtooth blenny in the genus Ecsenius. It is found in coral reefs in the western central Pacific ocean, around several islands in Papua New Guinea. It can reach a maximum length of 3.2 centimetres. Blennies in this species feed primarily off of plants, including benthic algae and weeds.
