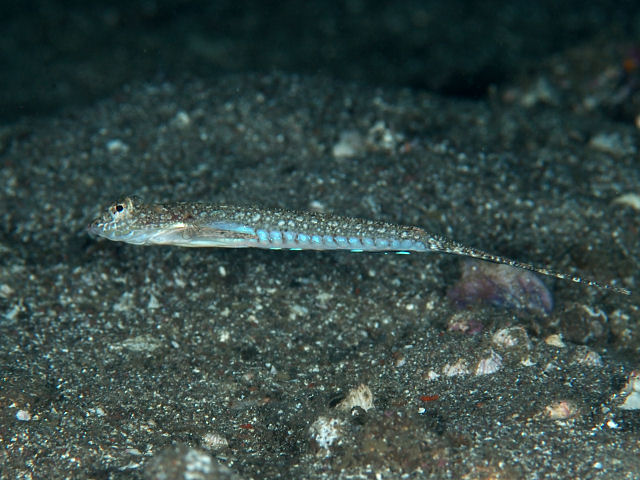

Scientific classification
- Kingdom: Animalia
- Phylum: Chordata
- Class: Actinopterygii
- Order: Syngnathiformes
- Family: Callionymidae
- Genus: Callionymus
- Species: C. izuensis

Binomial name
- Callionymus izuensis Frick and Brownell, 1993

Synonyms
- Calliurichthys izuensis (Fricke & Zaiser Brownell, 1993)

= Callionymus izuensis =

Species of fish

Callionymus izuensis, the Izu dragonet, is a species of dragonet which is endemic to the waters around the Izu Islands of Japan. It is found at depths of 16–18 metres (52–59 ft) over substrates consisting of coarse sand, although sometimes coral rubble and broken shells may form part of the habitat. It was originally described as a subspecies of Callionymus persicus from the western Indian Ocean and has also been placed in the genus Calliurichthys by some authorities.
