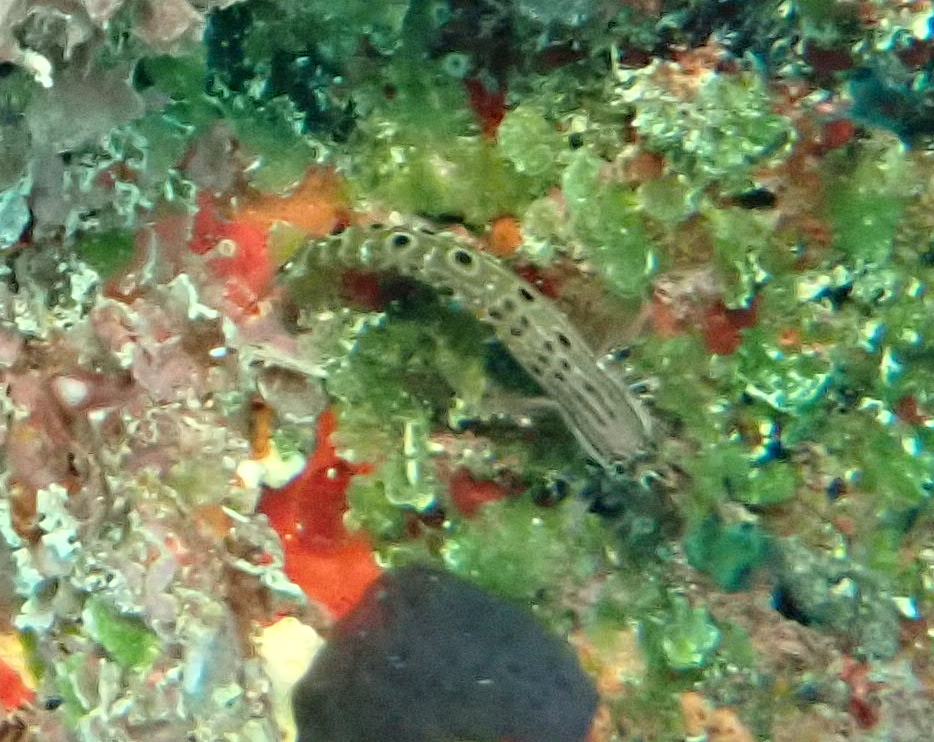

Conservation status
- Least Concern (IUCN 3.1)

Scientific classification
- Kingdom: Animalia
- Phylum: Chordata
- Class: Actinopterygii
- Order: Blenniiformes
- Family: Blenniidae
- Genus: Ecsenius
- Species: E. pardus

Binomial name
- Ecsenius pardus V. G. Springer, 1988

= Ecsenius pardus =

Species of fish

Ecsenius pardus is a species of combtooth blenny. It is found in the western Pacific Ocean, around Fiji. It can reach a maximum length of 4.8 centimetres. Blennies in this species feed primarily off of plants, including benthic algae and weeds.
