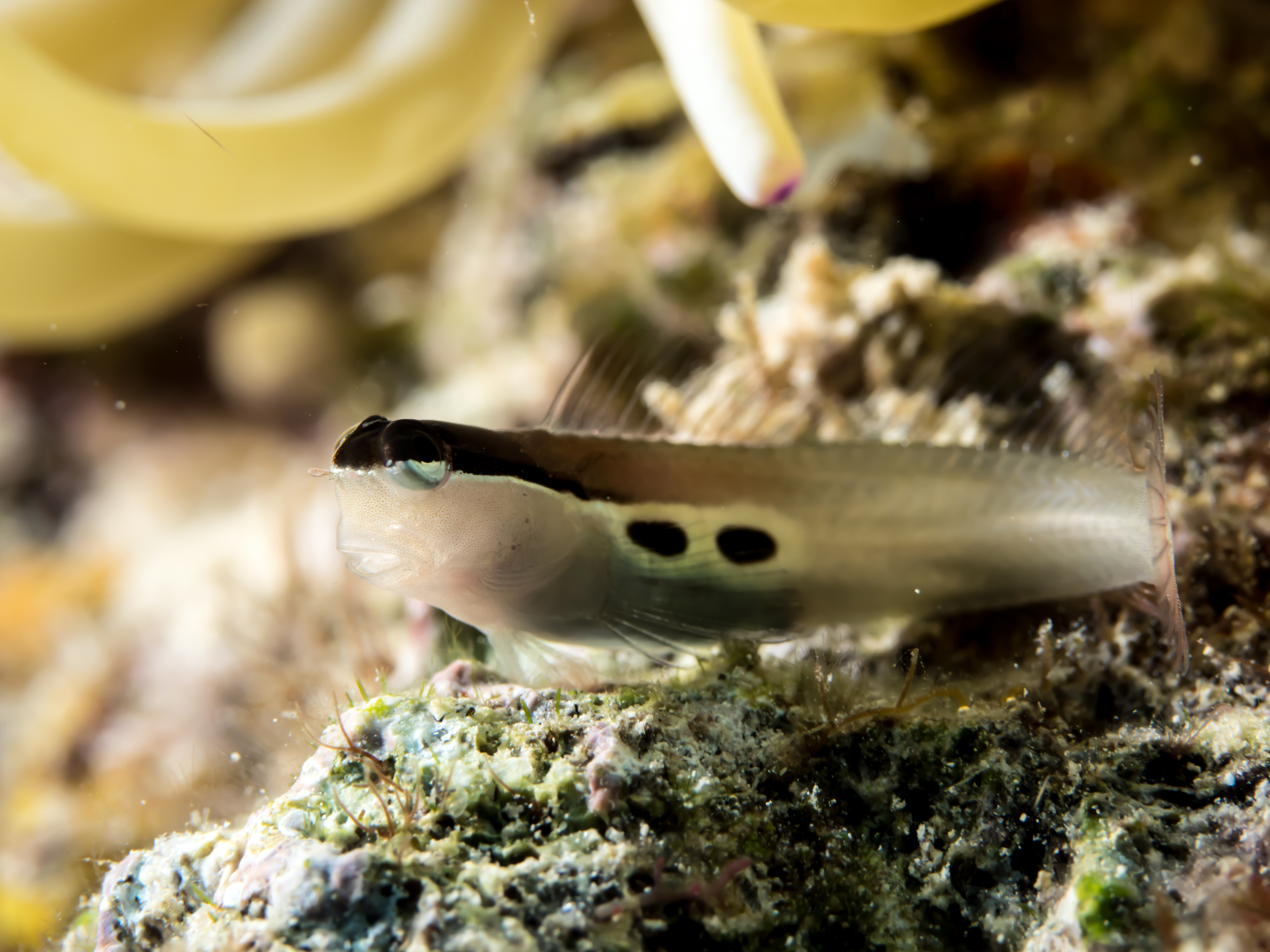

Conservation status
- Least Concern (IUCN 3.1)

Scientific classification
- Kingdom: Animalia
- Phylum: Chordata
- Class: Actinopterygii
- Order: Blenniiformes
- Family: Blenniidae
- Genus: Ecsenius
- Species: E. bimaculatus

Binomial name
- Ecsenius bimaculatus V. G. Springer, 1971

= Ecsenius bimaculatus =

Species of fish

Ecsenius bimaculatus, known commonly as the twinspot coralblenny, is a species of marine fish in the family Blenniidae.

The twinspot coralblenny is widespread throughout the tropical waters of the western Pacific Ocean and particularly in the Philippines and the northeast of Borneo, which is the Malaysian province of Sabah.

It grows to a size of 5 cm (2 in) in length.

It occasionally makes its way into the aquarium trade.
