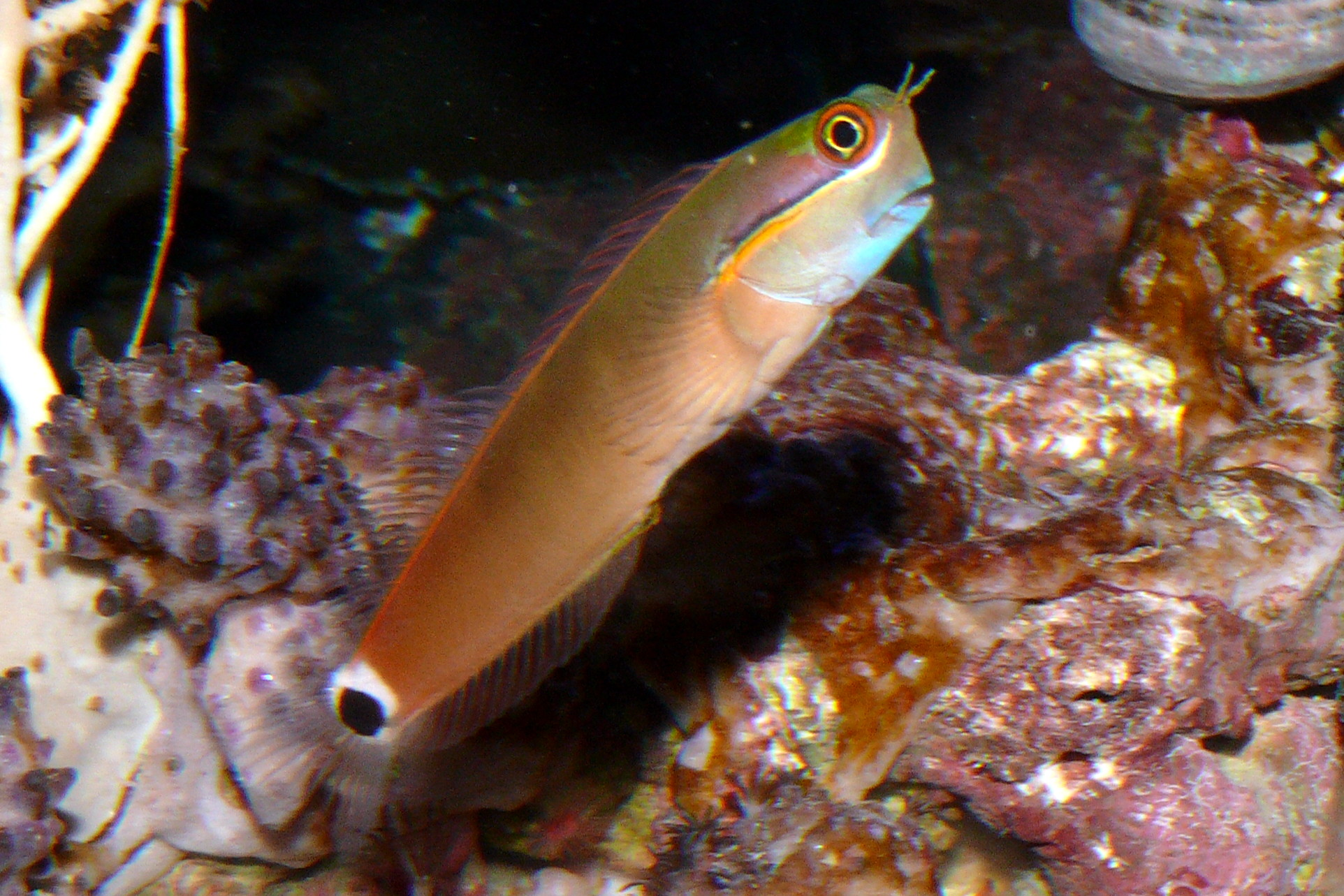

Conservation status
- Least Concern (IUCN 3.1)

Scientific classification
- Kingdom: Animalia
- Phylum: Chordata
- Class: Actinopterygii
- Order: Blenniiformes
- Family: Blenniidae
- Genus: Ecsenius
- Species: E. stigmatura

Binomial name
- Ecsenius stigmatura Fowler, 1952

= Ecsenius stigmatura =

Species of fish

Ecsenius stigmatura, commonly known as the tail-spot blenny, is a blenny from the Western Pacific. It occasionally makes its way into the aquarium trade. A coppery-coloured fish with a distinct blackish spot at the base of the tail. It has some vibrant colors below the eye which can be made bright pink if threatened. It grows to a size of 6 cm in length.

== Gallery ==
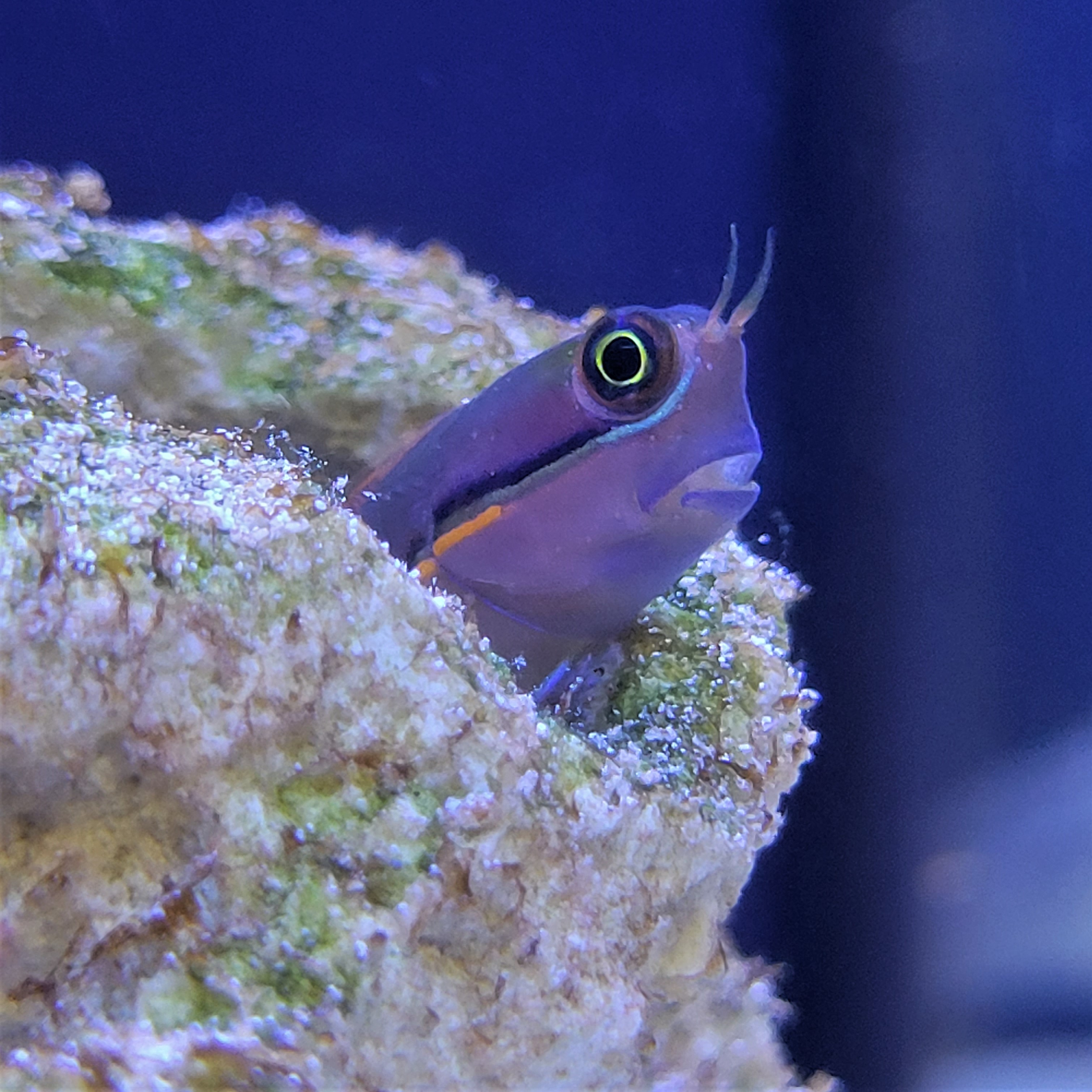
An E. stigmatura specimen peering from a rock in a home aquarium

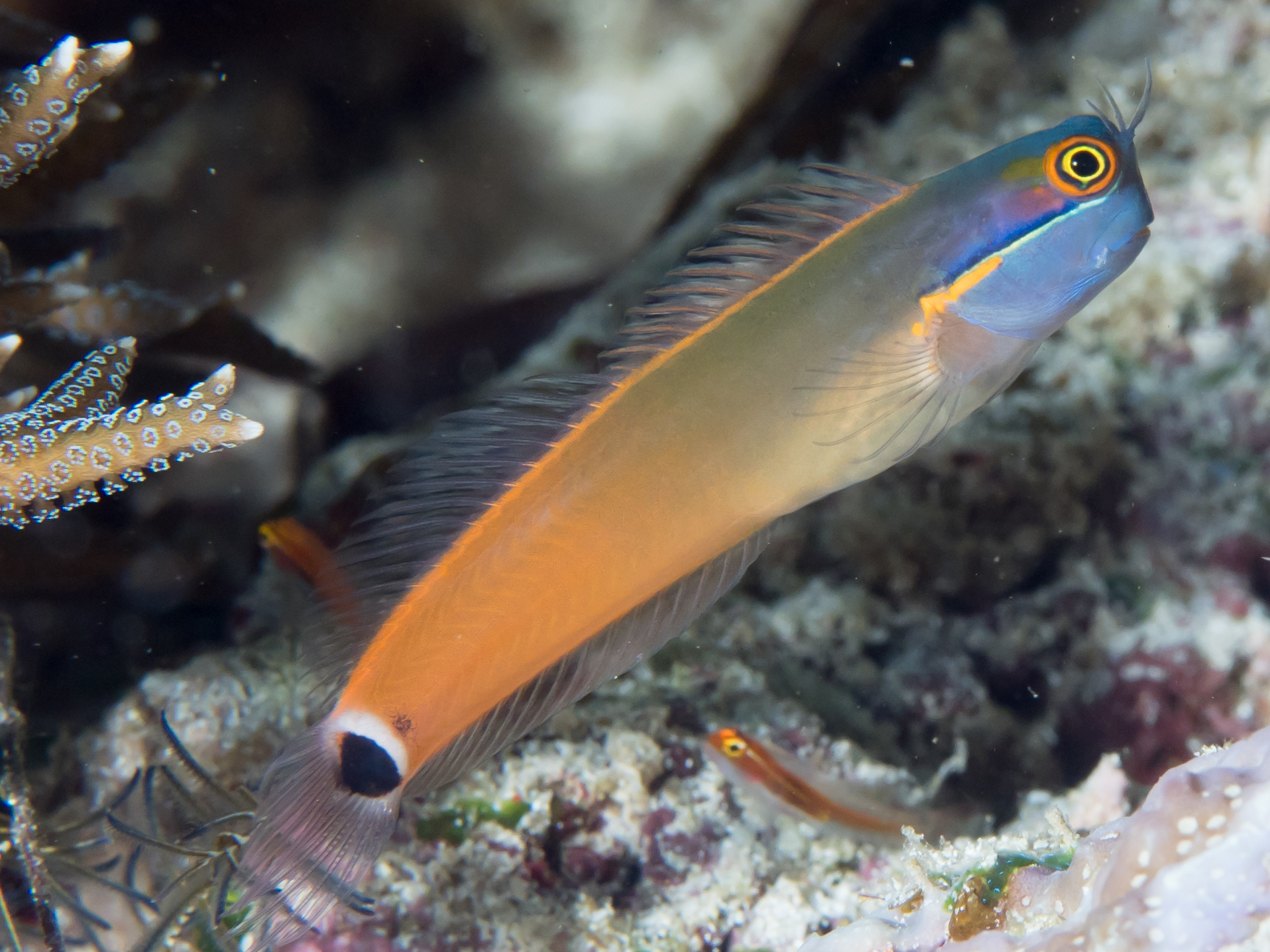
A wild E. stigmatura specimen swimming in a reef environment

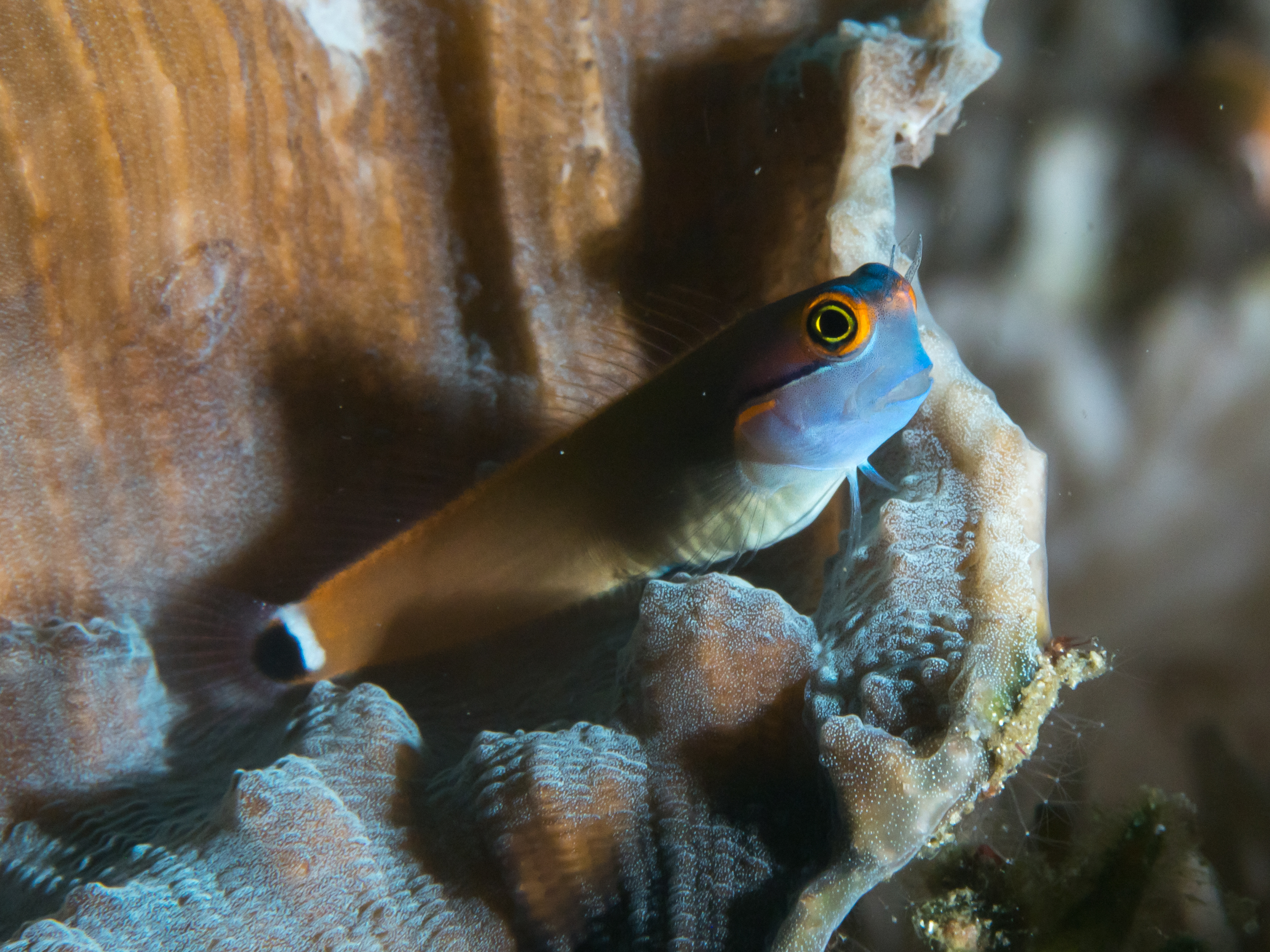
Another wild E. stigmatura specimen photographed in a reef environment
