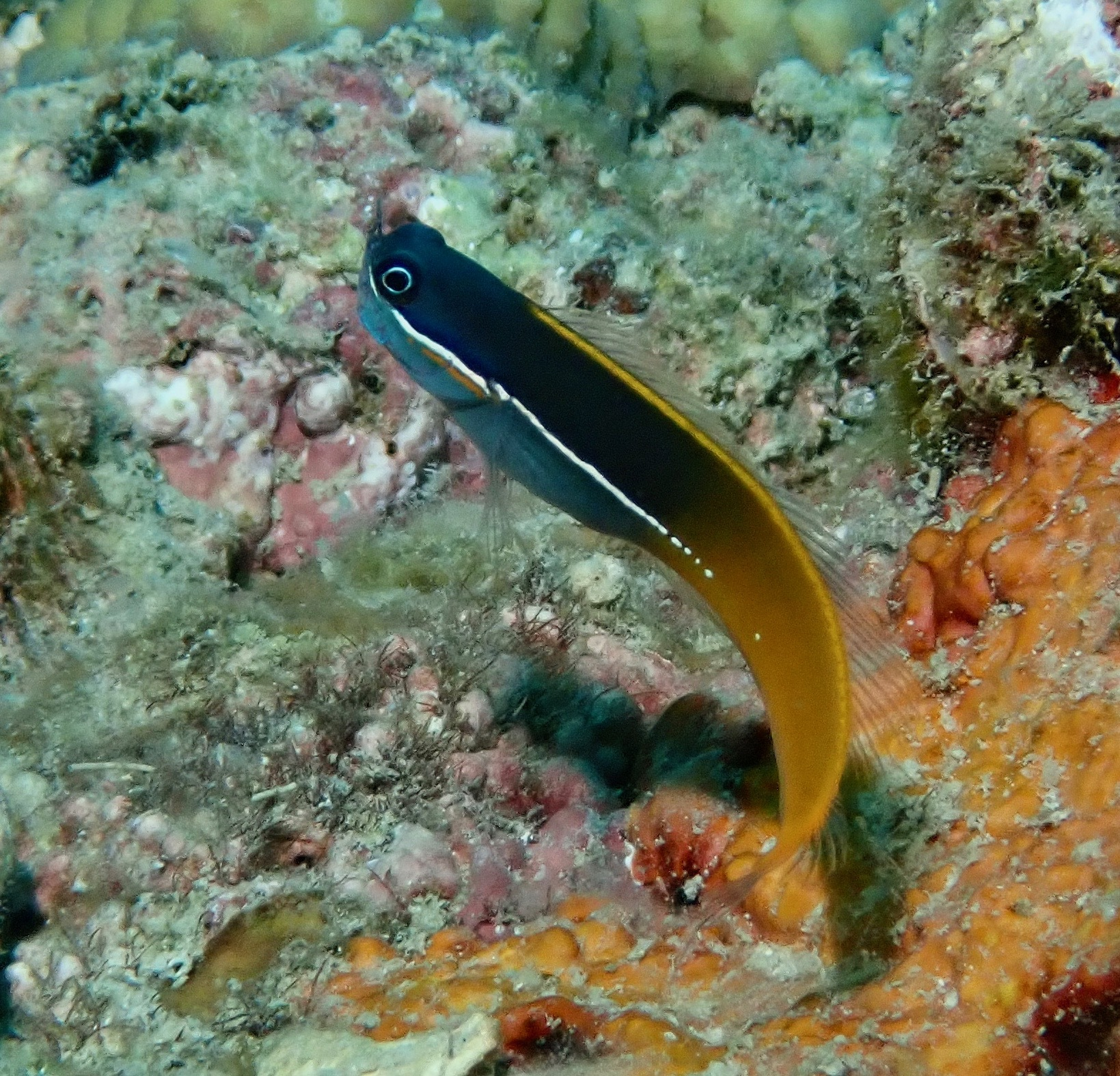

Conservation status
- Vulnerable (IUCN 3.1)

Scientific classification
- Kingdom: Animalia
- Phylum: Chordata
- Class: Actinopterygii
- Order: Blenniiformes
- Family: Blenniidae
- Genus: Ecsenius
- Species: E. tricolor

Binomial name
- Ecsenius tricolor V. G. Springer & G. R. Allen, 2001

= Ecsenius tricolor =

Species of fish

Ecsenius tricolor, known commonly as the Derawan combtooth-blenny in Indonesia, is a species of combtooth blenny in the genus Ecsenius. It is found in the western central Pacific ocean, around the Philippines and Borneo. It can reach a maximum length of 6 centimetres. Blennies in this species feed primarily off of plants, including benthic algae and weeds.
