= Ecsenius bandanus =

Conservation status
- Least Concern (IUCN 3.1)

Scientific classification
- Kingdom: Animalia
- Phylum: Chordata
- Class: Actinopterygii
- Order: Blenniiformes
- Family: Blenniidae
- Genus: Ecsenius
- Species: E. bandanus

Binomial name
- Ecsenius bandanus V. G. Springer, 1971

Species of fish

Ecsenius bandanus, known commonly as the Banda comb-tooth, Banda clown blenny, or the Banda combtooth-blenny, is a species of combtooth blenny found in coral reefs in the western Pacific ocean.
