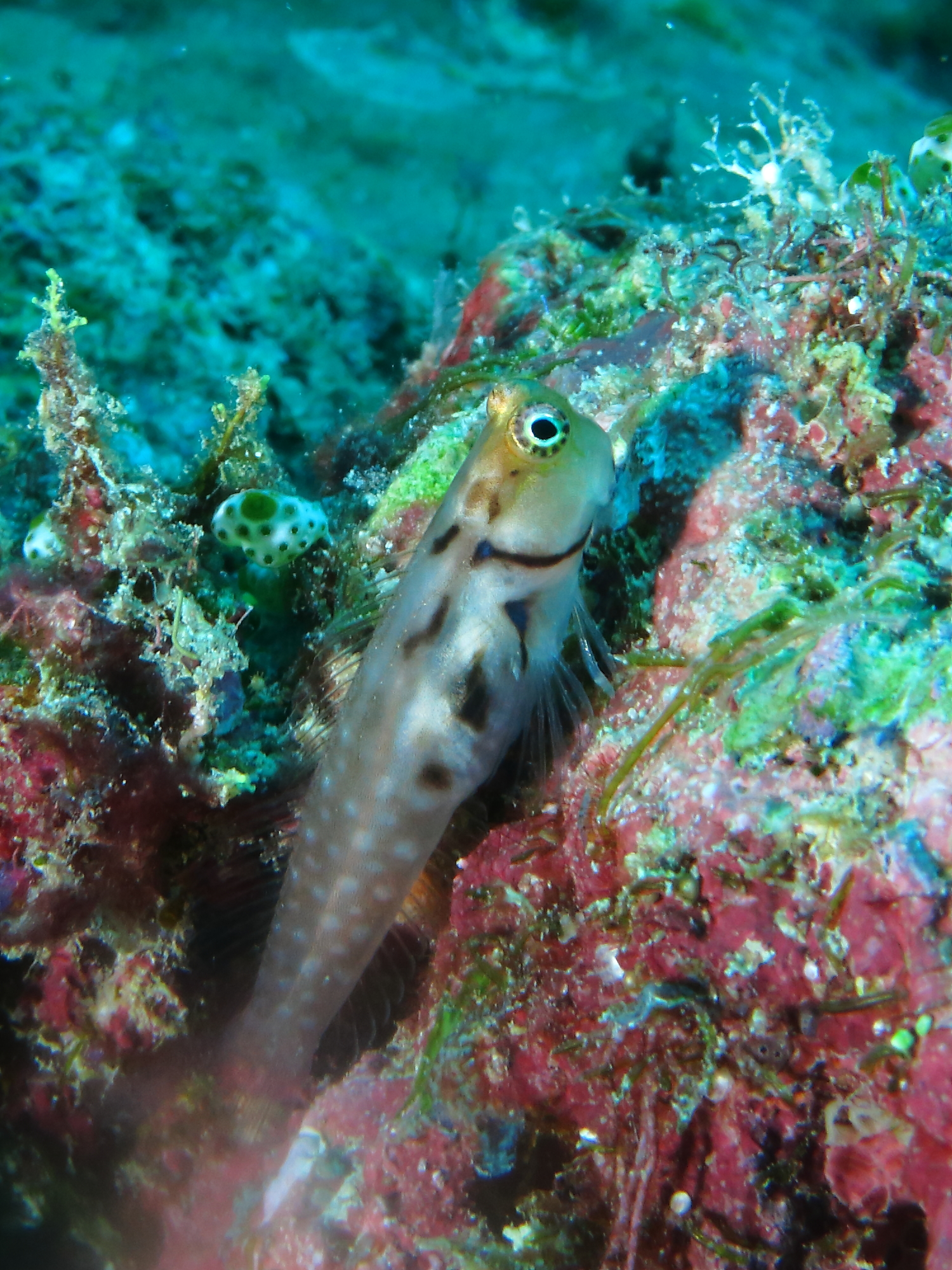

Conservation status
- Least Concern (IUCN 3.1)

Scientific classification
- Kingdom: Animalia
- Phylum: Chordata
- Class: Actinopterygii
- Order: Blenniiformes
- Family: Blenniidae
- Genus: Ecsenius
- Species: E. minutus

Binomial name
- Ecsenius minutus Klausewitz, 1963

= Ecsenius minutus =

Species of fish

Ecsenius minutus is a species of combtooth blenny in the genus Ecsenius. It is found in coral reefs in the Maldives, in the western Indian Ocean. It can reach a maximum length of 4 centimetres. Blennies in this species feed primarily off of plants, including benthic algae and weeds, and are commercial aquarium fish.
