= Ecsenius fourmanoiri =

Conservation status
- Least Concern (IUCN 3.1)

Scientific classification
- Kingdom: Animalia
- Phylum: Chordata
- Class: Actinopterygii
- Order: Blenniiformes
- Family: Blenniidae
- Genus: Ecsenius
- Species: E. fourmanoiri

Binomial name
- Ecsenius fourmanoiri V. G. Springer, 1972

Species of fish

Ecsenius fourmanoiri, the blackstriped combtooth blenny, is a species of combtooth blenny in the genus Ecsenius. It is found in the western Pacific ocean. It can reach a maximum length of 4.9 centimetres. Blennies in this species feed primarily off of benthic algae and weeds. The specific name honours the French ichthyologist Pierre Fourmanoir (1924-2007), who collected the first specimens of this species and realised that it had not been described.
