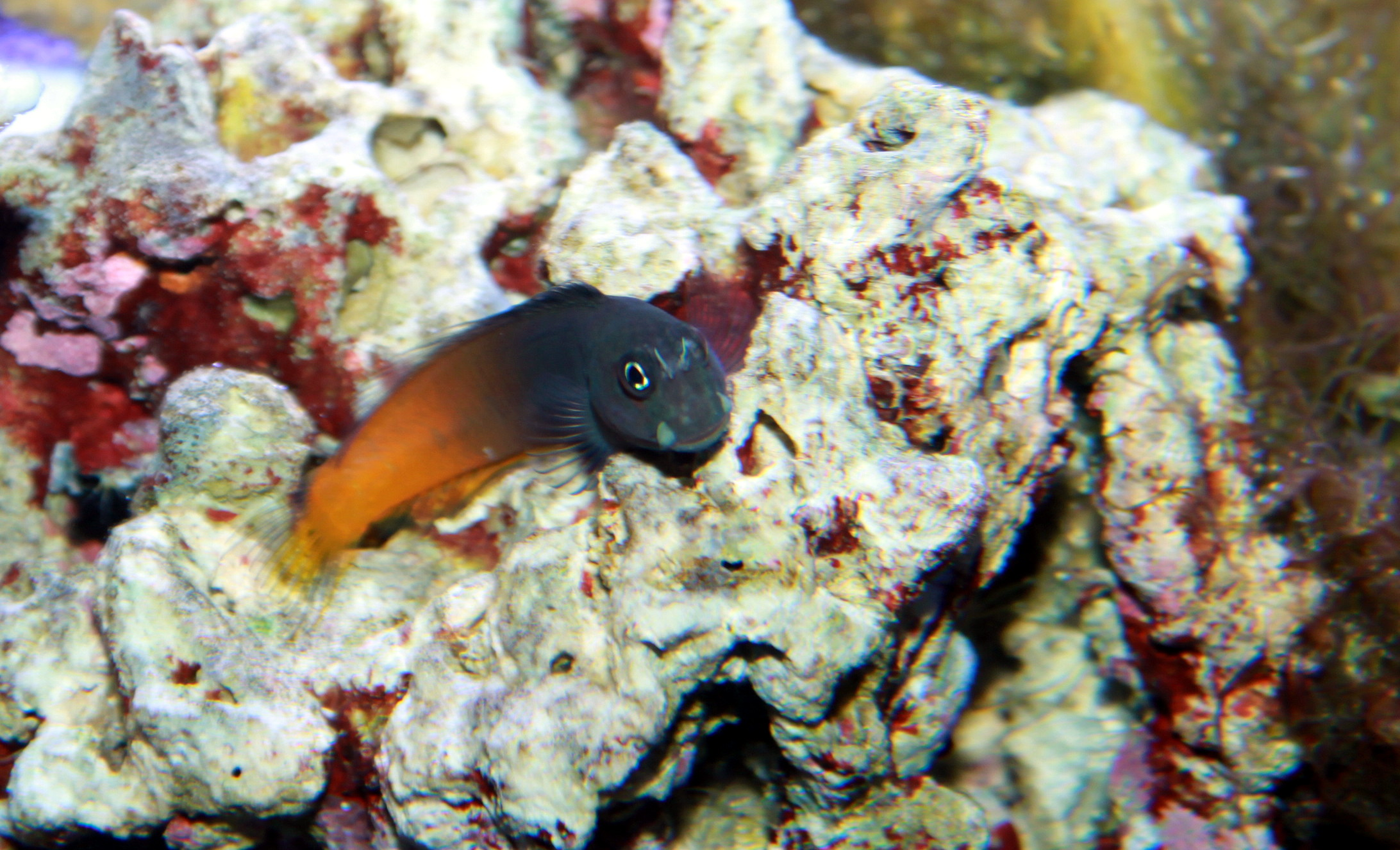

Conservation status
- Least Concern (IUCN 3.1)

Scientific classification
- Kingdom: Animalia
- Phylum: Chordata
- Class: Actinopterygii
- Order: Blenniiformes
- Family: Blenniidae
- Genus: Ecsenius
- Species: E. bicolor

Binomial name
- Ecsenius bicolor (F. Day, 1888)

Synonyms
- Salarias bicolor Day, 1888; Salarias furcatus Johnstone, 1904; Salarias melanosoma Regan, 1909; Salarias burmanicus Hora & Mukerji, 1936; Ecsenius hawaiiensis Chapman & Schultz, 1952

= Ecsenius bicolor =

Species of fish

Ecsenius bicolor, commonly known as the flame tail blenny or bicolor blenny, is a blenny from the Indo-Pacific. It frequently makes its way into the aquarium trade. It grows to a size of 11 centimetres (4.3 in) in length.
