= Ecsenius yaeyamaensis =

- Male

Conservation status
- Least Concern (IUCN 3.1)

Scientific classification
- Kingdom: Animalia
- Phylum: Chordata
- Class: Actinopterygii
- Order: Blenniiformes
- Family: Blenniidae
- Genus: Ecsenius
- Species: E. yaeyamaensis

Binomial name
- Ecsenius yaeyamaensis (Aoyagi, 1954)

Species of fish

Ecsenius yaeyamaensis, known commonly as the Yaeyama blenny in Guam and Micronesia, and also known as the Yaeyama clown blenny in Micronesia, or the Pale-spotted combtooth-blenny in Indonesia is a species of combtooth blenny in the genus Ecsenius. It is found in coral reefs in the western Pacific and Indian oceans. It can reach a maximum length of 6 centimetres. Blennies in this species feed primarily off of plants, including benthic algae and weeds, and are commercial aquarium fish.
