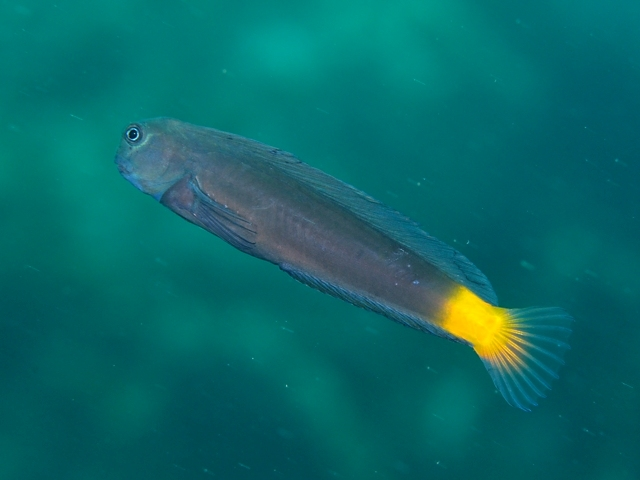

Conservation status
- Least Concern (IUCN 3.1)

Scientific classification
- Kingdom: Animalia
- Phylum: Chordata
- Class: Actinopterygii
- Order: Blenniiformes
- Family: Blenniidae
- Genus: Ecsenius
- Species: E. namiyei

Binomial name
- Ecsenius namiyei (D. S. Jordan & Evermann, 1902)

= Ecsenius namiyei =

Species of fish

Ecsenius namiyei, commonly called black comb-tooth blenny or Namiye's coralblenny, is a species of marine fish in the family Blenniidae. The specific name honours the Japanese zoologist and museum curator Motoyoshi Namiye (1854–1915).

The black comb-tooth is widespread throughout the tropical waters of the western Pacific Ocean from the Philippines to Solomon Islands.

It grows to a size of 11 cm in length.

It occasionally makes its way into the aquarium trade.
