= Ecsenius lividanalis =

Conservation status
- Least Concern (IUCN 3.1)

Scientific classification
- Kingdom: Animalia
- Phylum: Chordata
- Class: Actinopterygii
- Order: Blenniiformes
- Family: Blenniidae
- Genus: Ecsenius
- Species: E. lividanalis

Binomial name
- Ecsenius lividanalis W. M. Chapman & L. P. Schultz, 1952

Species of fish

Ecsenius lividanalis, known commonly as the blue-head combtooth-blenny in Indonesia and also known as the blue-headed combtooth blenny, is a species of combtooth blenny in the genus Ecsenius. It is found in coral reefs throughout the western Pacific ocean. It can reach a maximum length of 5 centimetres. Blennies in this species feed primarily off of plants, including benthic algae and weeds, and are commercial aquarium fish. There are two colour forms of this blenny, both of which have a black spot around the anus. One form has a blue head with a yellow body and iris while the other form is dark, occasionally all yellow, with a bluish-white iris, a yellow back and a yellow caudal fin.
