= Ecsenius prooculis =

Conservation status
- Least Concern (IUCN 3.1)

Scientific classification
- Kingdom: Animalia
- Phylum: Chordata
- Class: Actinopterygii
- Order: Blenniiformes
- Family: Blenniidae
- Genus: Ecsenius
- Species: E. prooculis

Binomial name
- Ecsenius prooculis W. M. Chapman & L. P. Schultz, 1952

Species of fish

Ecsenius prooculis is a species of combtooth blenny in the genus Ecsenius. It is found in coral reefs in the western Pacific ocean, around Papua New Guinea and the Solomon Islands. It can reach a maximum length of 3.7 centimetres. Blennies in this species feed primarily off of plants, including benthic algae and weeds.
