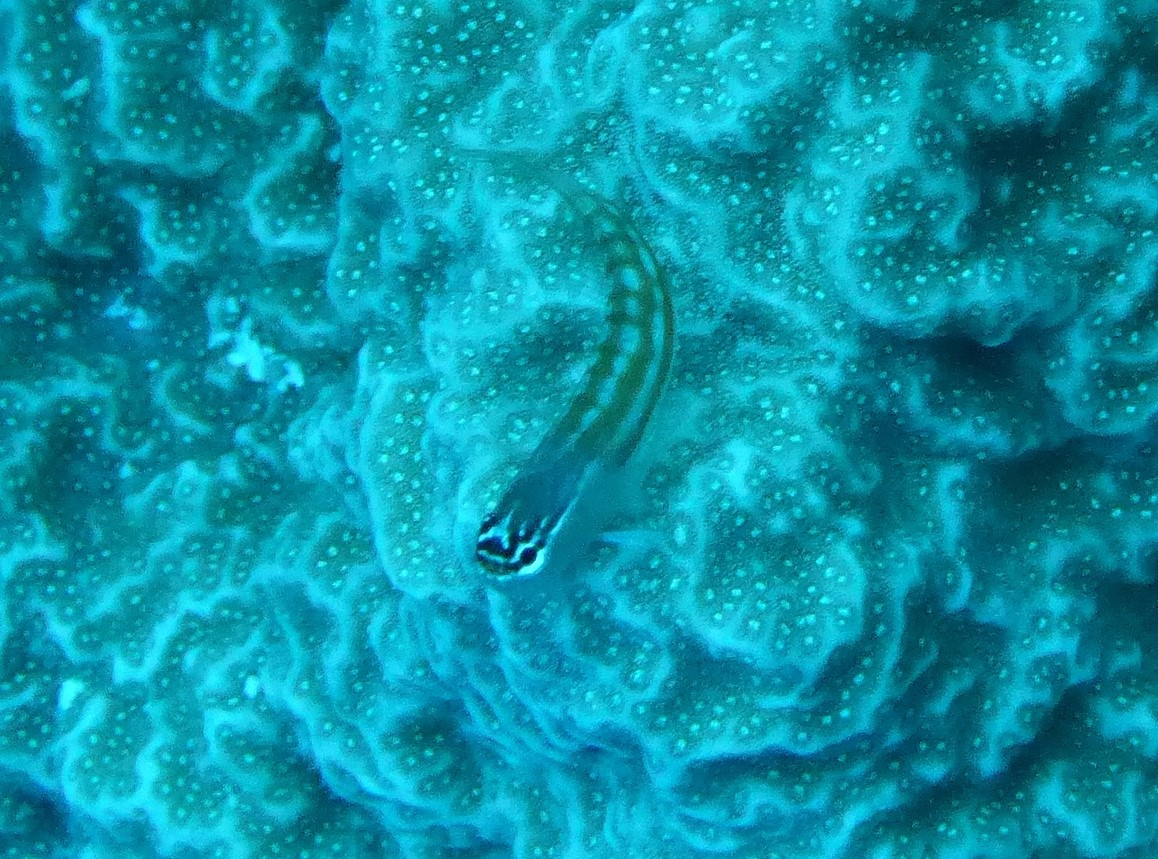

Conservation status
- Least Concern (IUCN 3.1)

Scientific classification
- Kingdom: Animalia
- Phylum: Chordata
- Class: Actinopterygii
- Order: Blenniiformes
- Family: Blenniidae
- Genus: Ecsenius
- Species: E. opsifrontalis

Binomial name
- Ecsenius opsifrontalis W. M. Chapman & L. P. Schultz, 1952

= Ecsenius opsifrontalis =

Species of fish

Ecsenius opsifrontalis, known commonly as the comical blenny in Micronesia, is a species of combtooth blenny in the genus Ecsenius. It is found in coral reefs in the Pacific Ocean. It can reach a maximum length of 5 centimetres. Blennies in this species feed primarily off of plants, including benthic algae and weeds, and are commercial aquarium fish.
