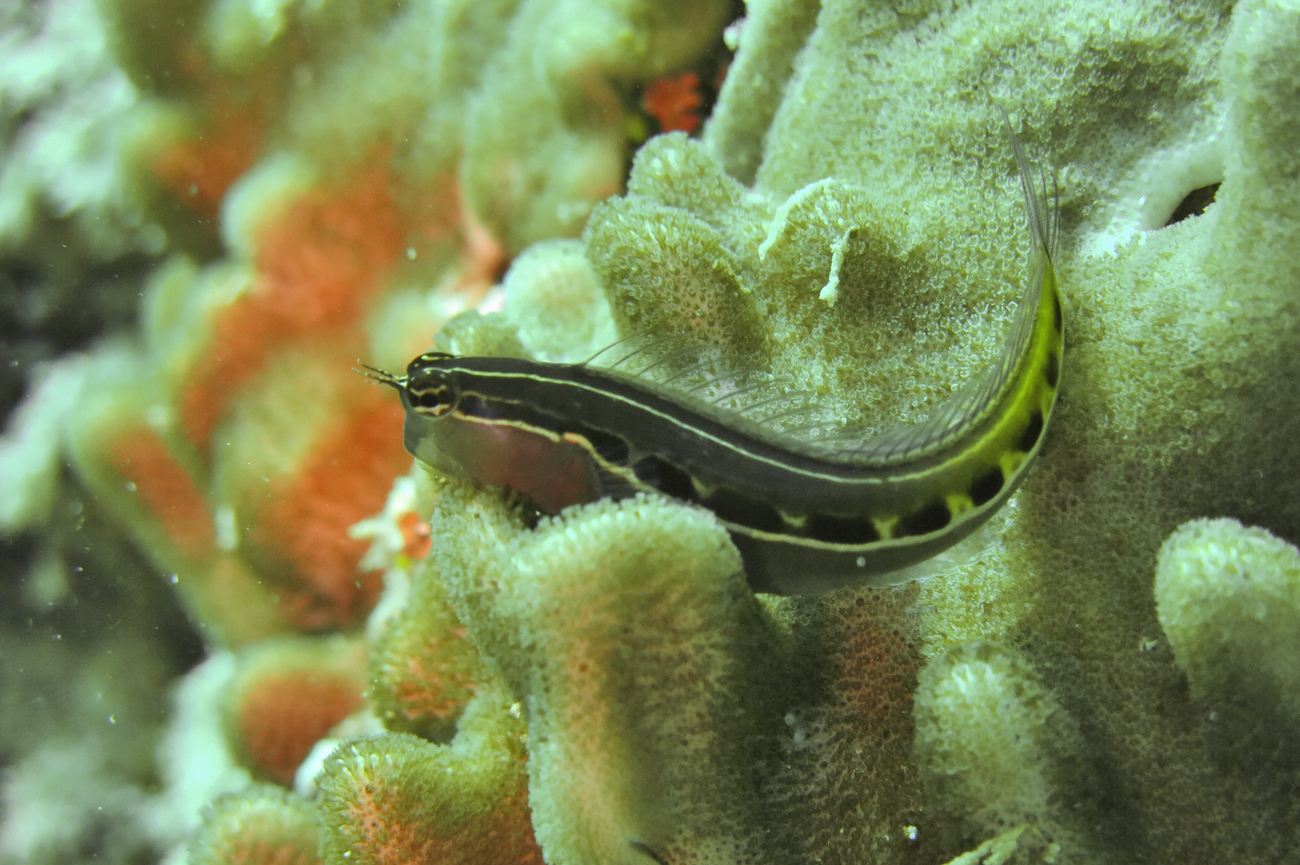

Conservation status
- Least Concern (IUCN 3.1)

Scientific classification
- Kingdom: Animalia
- Phylum: Chordata
- Class: Actinopterygii
- Order: Blenniiformes
- Family: Blenniidae
- Genus: Ecsenius
- Species: E. lineatus

Binomial name
- Ecsenius lineatus Klausewitz, 1962

= Ecsenius lineatus =

Linear blenny

Species of fish

Ecsenius lineatus, known commonly as the linear blenny or lined combtooth blenny, is a species of marine fish in the family Blenniidae.

The linear blenny is widespread throughout the tropical waters of the Indo-West Pacific area and particularly from the eastern coast of Africa to the Philippines.

It grows to a size of 8 cm in length.
