= Allan Riverstone McCulloch =

Australian ichthyologist

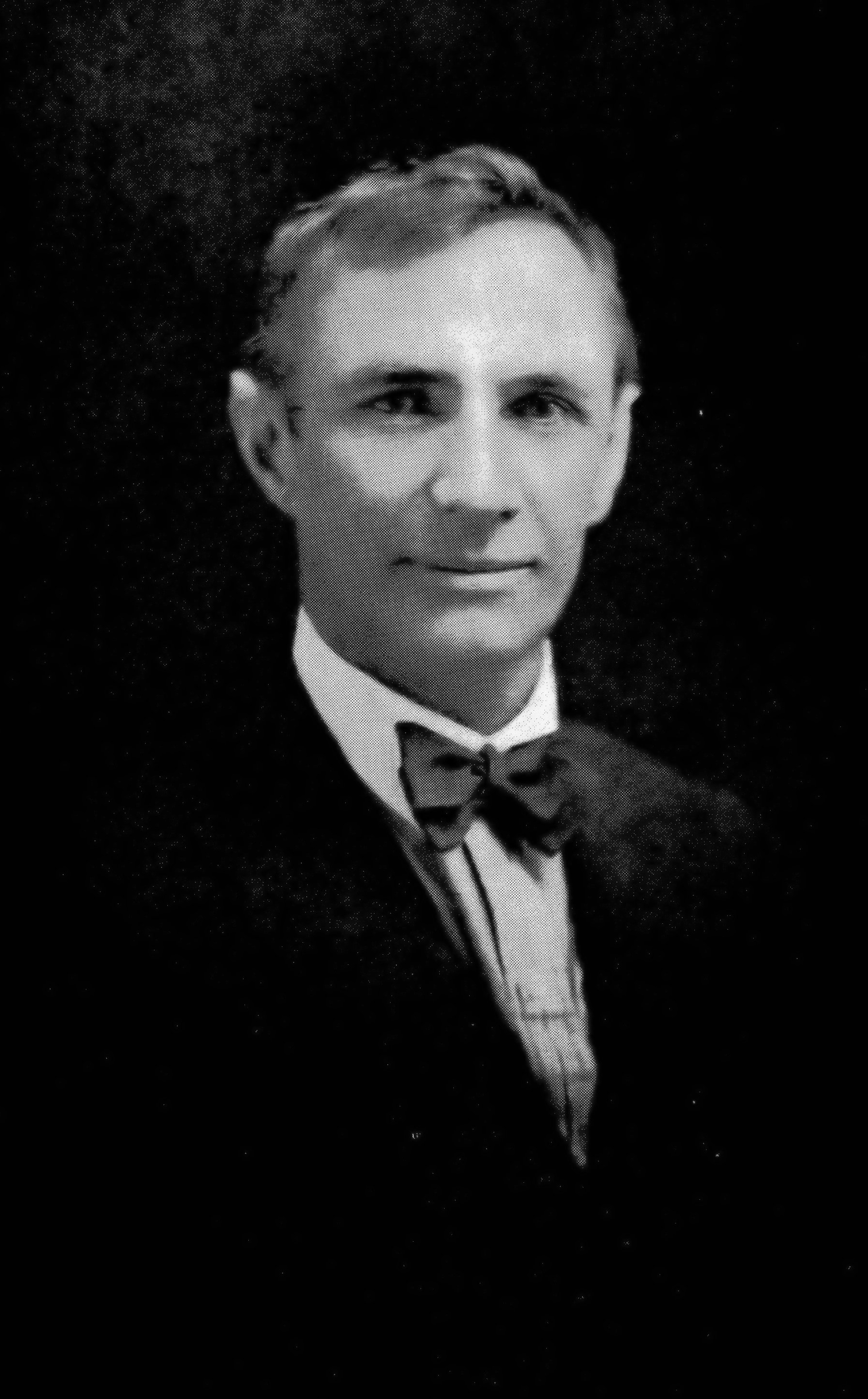
- Born: June 20, 1885; Sydney, New South Wales, Australia
- Died: September 1, 1925 (aged 40); Honolulu, Hawaii
- Occupation: Ichthyologist

Allan Riverstone McCulloch (20 June 1885 – 1 September 1925) was a prominent Australian ichthyologist.

Born in Sydney, Australia, McCulloch began his scientific career at the age of 13 as an unpaid assistant to Edgar Ravenswood Waite in the Australian Museum where Waite encouraged McCulloch to study zoology. Three years later, he was employed as a "mechanical assistant", and five years after that, as curator of fishes, a post he held until his death.

== Career ==
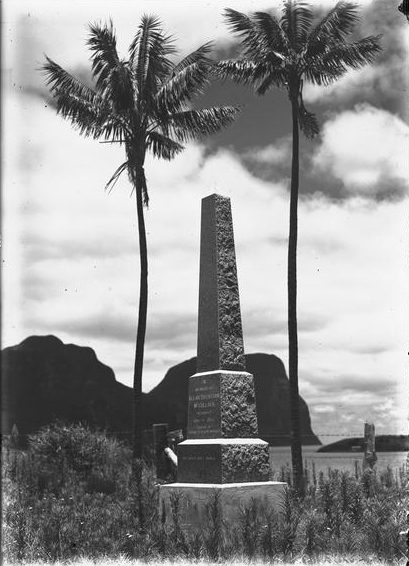
Memorial for Allan Riverstone McCulloch on Lord Howe Island.

McCulloch collected and published prolifically; from his first paper in 1906 (published in Records of the Australian Museum), no year passed without his making a contribution to science, and he wrote over 100 original papers in all, many including his own illustrations. McCulloch travelled widely for his collections, including trips to Queensland, Lord Howe Island, New Guinea, the Great Barrier Reef and various Pacific islands.

His major research interest was in fish, but he was also given the responsibility of the crustacean collection from 1905 to 1921, and he wrote several significant papers on decapods. In 1922 McCulloch journeyed through Papua with Captain Frank Hurley. In 1922 his Check List of Fishes and Fish-like Animals of New South Wales was published by the Royal Zoological Society of New South Wales.

== Death and legacy ==
McCulloch's hectic schedule seems to have damaged his health, and he was forced to spend a year off work for his health's sake. He died, however, in Honolulu in 1925. His collection ultimately included over 40,000 specimens, and he was considered "the greatest authority on fish in the southern hemisphere" (David Starr Jordan).

== See also ==
- Taxa named by Allan Riverstone McCulloch
