= Victor G. Springer =

American biologist

Victor Gruschka Springer
- Born: June 2, 1928; Jacksonville, Florida, U.S.
- Died: September 18, 2022 (aged 94)
- Education: University of Texas
- Scientific career
- Fields: Ichthyology
- Author abbrev. (zoology): Springer

Victor Gruschka Springer (June 2, 1928 – September 18, 2022) was an American biologist who was a Senior Scientist emeritus, Division of Fishes at the Smithsonian Institution's National Museum of Natural History. He was a specialist in the anatomy, classification, and distribution of fishes, with a special interest in tropical marine shorefishes. He published numerous scientific studies on these subjects; also, a popular book called "Sharks in Question, the Smithsonian Answer Book" 1989.

== Education ==
Springer gained his first degree, B.A. in biology at Emory University in 1948. His M.S. in botany at the University of Miami in 1954 was followed by his Ph.D. in zoology at the University of Texas in 1957.

== Research interests ==
Springer's research interests included the classification, evolution, and biogeography of fishes, especially marine fishes and notably Blennioid fishes. He was also interested in late 19th and 20th Century scientific illustrators of fishes such as Charles Bradford Hudson

== Death ==
Springer died on September 18, 2022, at the age of 94.

== Selected publications ==
- Springer, Victor G.; Gomon, Martin F. (1975). Revision of the Blenniid Fish Genus Omobranchus with Descriptions of Three New Species and Notes on Other Species of the Tribe Omobranchini. Smithsonian Institution Press.

== Taxon described by him ==
- See Category:Taxa named by Victor G. Springer

== Taxon named in his honor ==
- Biwia springeri (Bănărescu & Nalbant 1973) was named in honor of Springer who collected the type specimen.
- The Springer's dragonet, Synchiropus springeri R. Fricke, 1983 was named after him as it was he who collected the type specimens during his Fiji Islands Expedition in 1982 and loaned them and many other specimens to describer Fricke for examination.
- The Springer's barbelgoby, Gobiopsis springeri, is a species of goby found in the Western Central Pacific Ocean.
