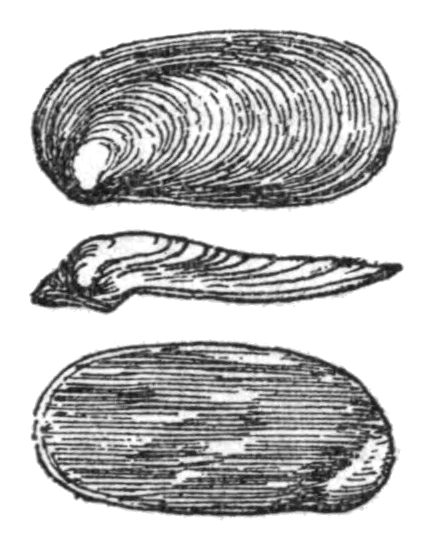
- Drawing of the internal shell of Mariaella beddomei.

Scientific classification
- Domain: Eukaryota
- Kingdom: Animalia
- Phylum: Mollusca
- Class: Gastropoda
- Order: Stylommatophora
- Family: Ariophantidae
- Genus: Mariaella
- Species: M. beddomei

Binomial name
- Mariaella beddomei (Godwin-Austen, 1888)

= Mariaella beddomei =

Species of gastropod

Mariaella beddomei is a species of air-breathing land slug, a terrestrial pulmonate gastropod mollusk in the family Ariophantidae.

The specific name is in honor of Richard Henry Beddome.

== Distribution ==
This species lives in India. It is endemic to Western Ghats. Its localities include Travancore Hills.

== Shell description ==
The internal shell is thinner than in Mariaella dussumieri, shelly, flat and smooth beneath, white, with close, concentric lines of growth. The length of the adult shell is 12 mm, the breath is 6.5 mm.

== Anatomy ==
The body of the animal varies greatly in color from uniform ochre to deep grey-black or spotted. There are no raised ridges on the shell-lobes. It is externally similar to Mariaella dussumieri, but larger, about 4 inches (100 mm) in length when fully extended. It has more numerous teeth in the radula, the number in a row being 122 . 5 . 21 . 1 . 21 . 5 . 122 (148 . 1 . 148), and the shape differing somewhat. There are also differences in the genitalia, the spermatheca and the expansion in the free oviduct (ovitheca) having different forms.

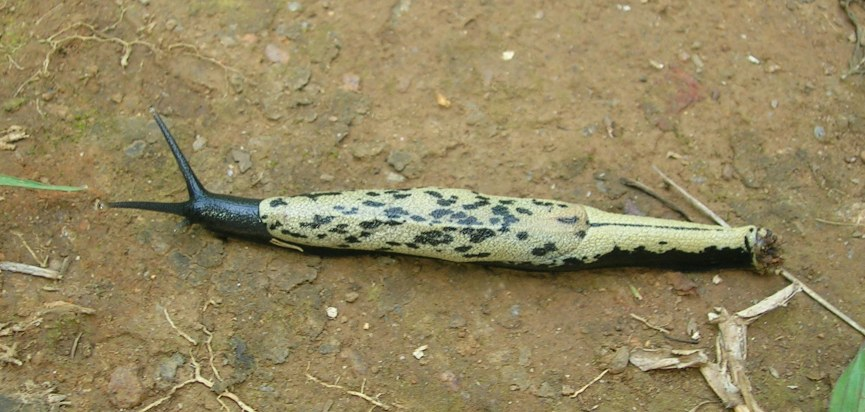
A slug from the Western Ghats of India. The species was earlier identified as Mariaella dussumieri but currently identified as Mariaella beddomei.
