= Jean-Jacques Dussumier =

French merchant and zoological collector (1792-1883)

Jean-Jacques Dussumier (1792–1883) was a French voyager and merchant from Bordeaux. He is known as a collector of zoological species from southern Asia and regions around the Indian Ocean between 1816 and 1840. These collections were later studied and classified by French zoologists such as Georges Cuvier, Achille Valenciennes, among others.

== Taxa named in his honor ==
Dussumier's name was lent to numerous species, and an entire genus of herrings is called Dussumieria. The following is a list of zoological species associated with Dussumier:

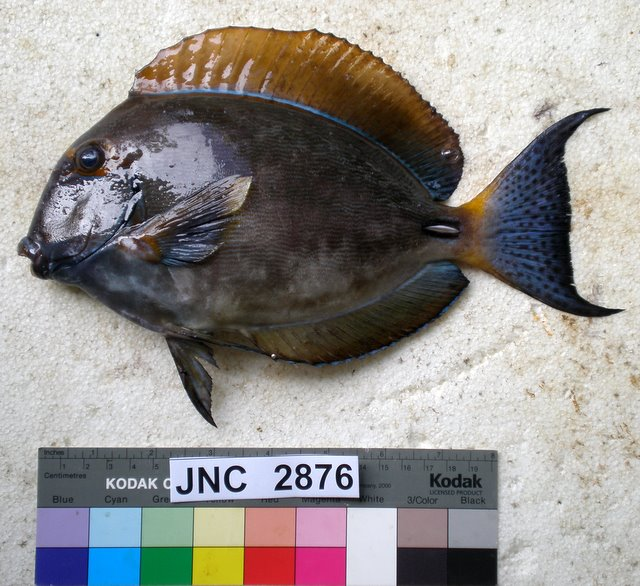
Acanthurus dussumieri from New Caledonia, an example of fish species named after Jean-Jacques Dussumier

- Acanthurus dussumieri – Dussumier's surgeonfish; aka Dussumieri tang
- Accipiter badius dussumieri – subspecies of Indian shikra
- Ambassis dussumieri G. Cuvier, 1828; the Malabar glassy perchlet.
- Anisakis dussumieri – a marine parasite
- Arius dussumieri – blacktip sea catfish
- Aspidontus dussumieri (Valenciennes, 1836) – lance blenny
- Austrobatrachus dussumieri – flat toadfish
- Boleophthalmus dussumieri Valenciennes, 1837 – a species of mudskipper in India
- Brama dussumieri – lesser bream
- Caligus dussumieri – a marine parasite
- Carcharhinus dussumieri – whitecheek shark
- Casarea dussumieri (Schlegel, 1837) – Round Island keel-scaled boa
- Cinnyris dussumieri – Seychelles sunbird
- Clarias dussumieri Valenciennes, 1840 – a species of air-breathing catfish
- Coilia dussumieri Valenciennes, 1848 – goldspotted grenadier anchovy
- Colletteichthys dussumieri (Valenciennes, 1837) the flat toadfish.
- Dieurostus dussumieri (A.M.C. Duméril, Bibron &
  A.H.A. Duméril, 1854) – Dussumier's water snake
- Dipsochelys dussumieri (synonym of Aldabrachelys gigantea) – Aldabra giant tortoise
- Draco dussumieri A.M.C. Duméril & Bibron, 1837 – South Indian flying dragon
- Hyporhamphus dussumieri (Valenciennes, 1847) – Dussumier's halfbeak
- Istiblennius dussumieri (Valenciennes, 1836) the streaky rockskipper a species of blenny
- Johnius dussumieri – Dussumier's croaker
- Labeo dussumieri (Valenciennes, 1842) – Malabar Labeo
- Leiognathus dussumieri – Dussumier's ponyfish
- Liza dussumieri – Dussumier's mullet
- Mariaella dussumieri – an Asian species of slug
- Mugil dussumieri – a species of gray mullet
- Salarias dussumieri – Dussumier's blenny
- Salmaciella dussumieri – a species of starfish
- Semnopithecus dussumieri – southern plains gray langur
- Sphenomorphus dussumieri – Dussumier's forest skink
- Tachysurus dussumieri – catfish from the Bay of Bengal
- Tetronychoteuthis dussumieri – a small mollusk
- Thryssa dussumieri – Dussumier's thryssa; an anchovy
- Uca dussumieri – a species of fiddler crab
