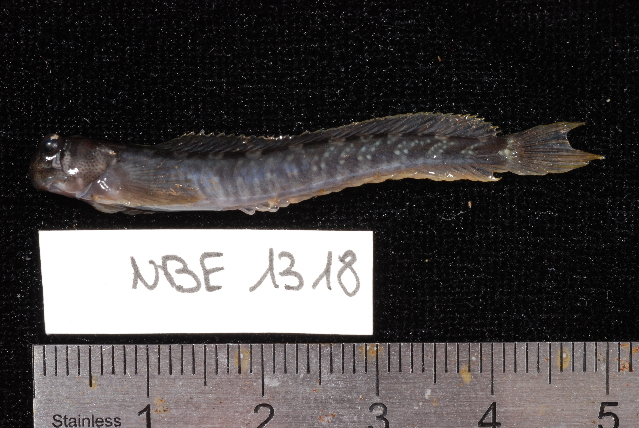

Conservation status
- Least Concern (IUCN 3.1)

Scientific classification
- Kingdom: Animalia
- Phylum: Chordata
- Class: Actinopterygii
- Order: Blenniiformes
- Family: Blenniidae
- Genus: Istiblennius
- Species: I. dussumieri

Binomial name
- Istiblennius dussumieri (Valenciennes, 1836)

= Istiblennius dussumieri =

Species of fish

Istiblennius dussumieri, the streaky rockskipper, is a species of combtooth blenny found in coral reefs in the western Pacific and Indian Oceans. It is also commonly known as the Dussumier's rockskipper, streaky dussumier, or the Dussumier's blenny.

== Description ==
Istiblennius dussumieri is dusky in colour marked with six to seven irregular double dusky bars on the flanks, there is a dark spot on the anterior part of the dorsal fin between the first two spines, and it has further dark spots on the dorsal and caudal fins. The females have dusky spots scattered over the body which correspond to the bands on the males, while the males show broad dark margins on the dorsal, caudal and anal fins. It can reach a maximum of 12 cm (4.7 in) TL.

== Distribution ==
Istiblennius dussumieri occurs throughout the Indo-West Pacific and marginally in the south-eastern Atlantic. Its range extends from the Cape of Good Hope eastwards through the Indian Ocean and the western Pacific as far as Palau. It extends south as far as Lord Howe Island and north to Taiwan, in 2006 it was recorded in the Ryukyu Islands of Japan.

== Habitat and biology ==
Istiblennius dussumieri occurs along very shallow rocky coasts, frequently in the intertidal zone where the water is less than 1 metre (3.3 ft) deep. It prefers sheltered shorelines where it often occurs along with Istiblennius edentulus. It will also occur in mangrove areas. They are oviparous and form pairs, the eggs adhere to the substrate while the planktonic larvae are found in shallow, coastal waters.

== Etymology ==
The specific name honours the collector of the type, the French voyager and merchant Jean-Jacques Dussumier (1792–1883).
