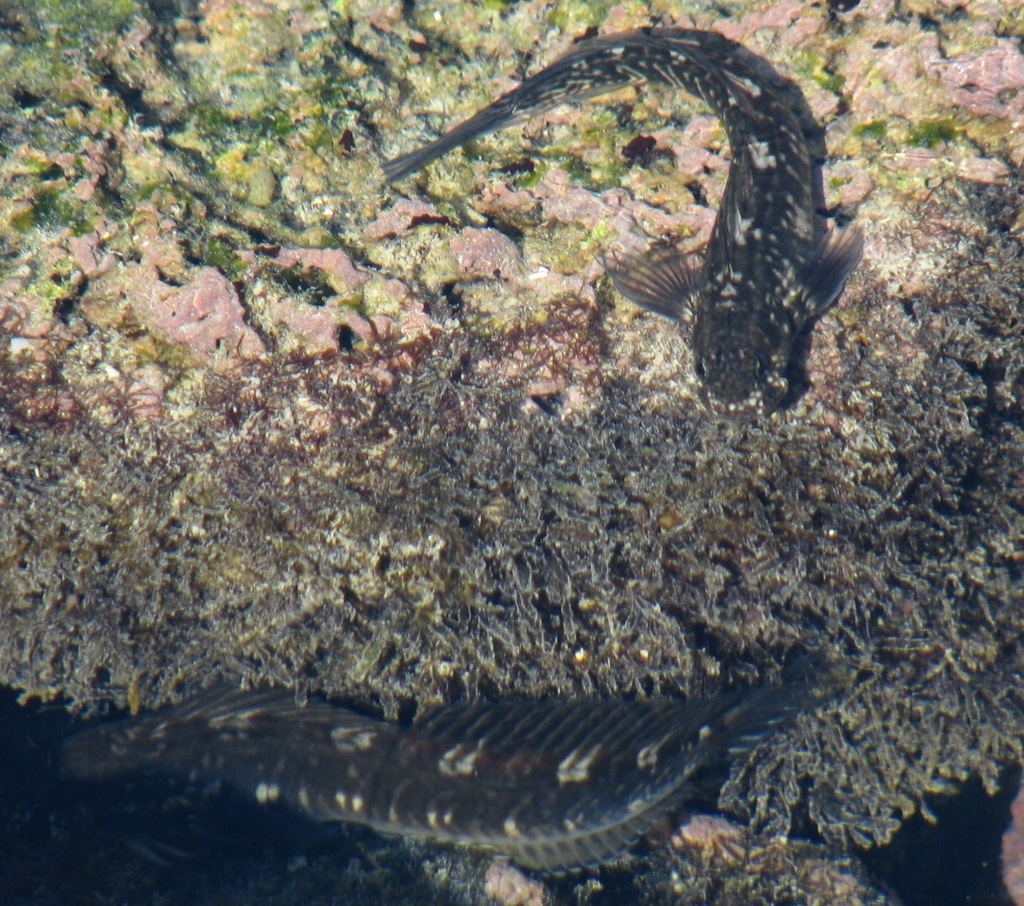

Conservation status
- Least Concern (IUCN 3.1)

Scientific classification
- Kingdom: Animalia
- Phylum: Chordata
- Class: Actinopterygii
- Order: Blenniiformes
- Family: Blenniidae
- Genus: Istiblennius
- Species: I. zebra

Binomial name
- Istiblennius zebra (Vaillant & Sauvage, 1875)

Synonyms
- Salarias zebra Vaillant & Sauvage, 1875; Salarias cypho Jenkins, 1903

= Istiblennius zebra =

Species of fish

Istiblennius zebra, commonly known as the zebra blenny or Pāoʻo, is a species of combtooth blenny found in tide pools around the Hawaiian Islands. It is also referred to as the zebra rockskipper, rockskipper, jumping jack or the gori.

== Description and biology ==
The appearance of these fish can vary, ranging from shades of smart blue-black to charcoal or brownish gray with clear stripes. When in shallow water or when startled, their bodies can become speckled. Adults have a line of small, bright blue dots beneath their eyes. On their heads, there's a crest and two tentacles (with longer tentacles in males), which collapse when they are out of the water. Males of this species can reach a maximum standard length of 19.3 cm (7.6 in), while females can reach a maximum length of 14.1 cm (5.6 in). These fish engage in spawning throughout the year, peaking during the spring and early summer. Breeding males develop light yellow-tan patches on their cheeks that become more vivid when they defend their territory and disappear when they leave.The male constructs a nest in a crevice and performs vertical loops to attract a female. The female attaches up to 10,000 eggs to the walls of the crevice, which the male fertilizes and then guards until they hatch, typically taking about two weeks. The larvae venture into the sea for an unspecified duration before returning to tide pools when they reach approximately half an inch in length. They primarily feed on organic debris that gathers on the rocky surfaces and bottoms of the pools they inhabit.

== Distribution and habitat ==
The zebra blenny is endemic to Hawaii. They can leap, slide, and skip up to 2 feet above the water's surface as a survival mechanism. This intertidal fish's habitat is located in high tidepools. These fish are commonly found in tranquil pools above the high tide line and swim using side-to-side movements with their pectoral fins tucked along their sides. They sometimes come partially out of the water for sunbathing.

== Human use ==
It can be found in the aquarium trade.
