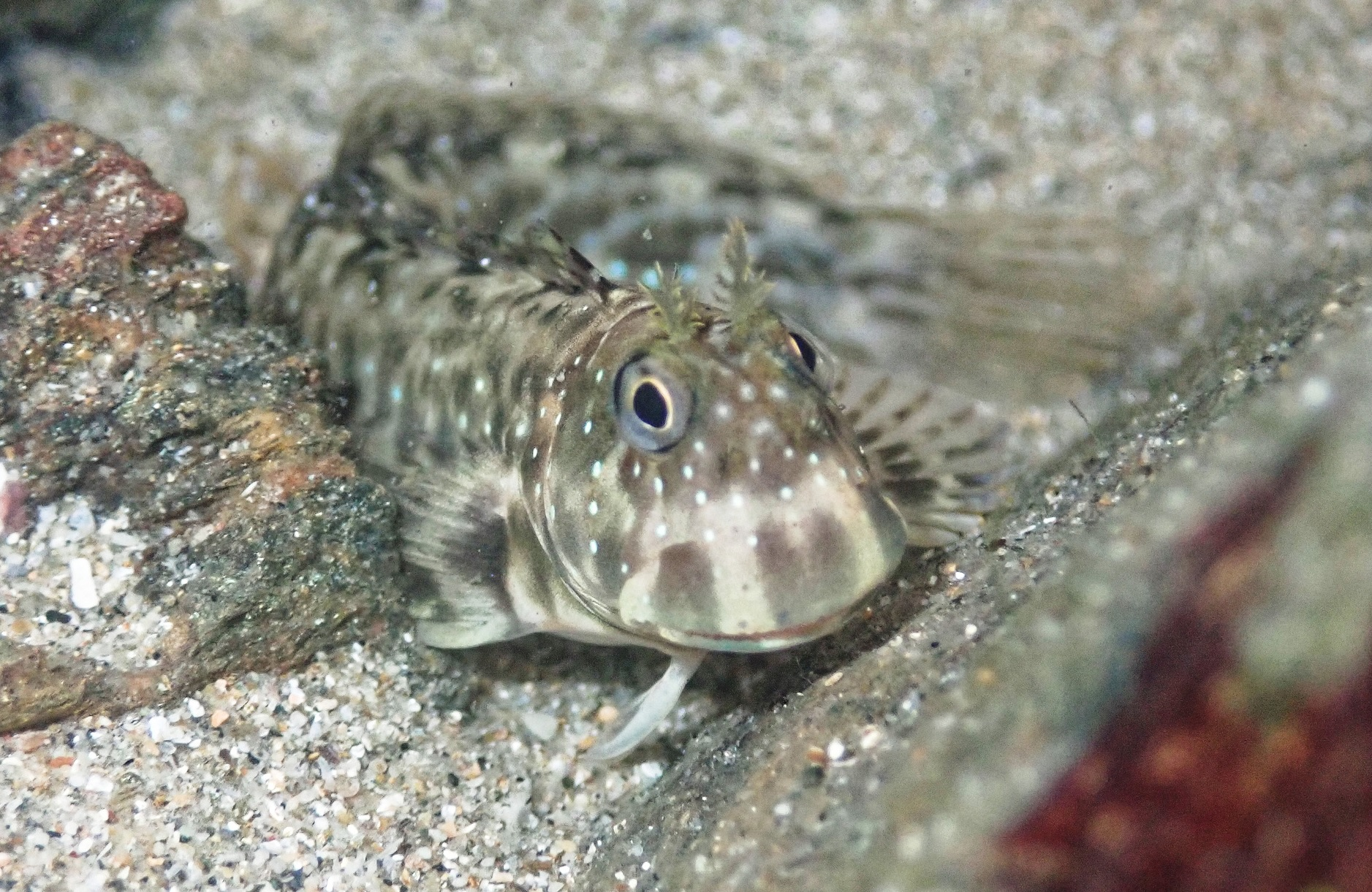

Conservation status
- Least Concern (IUCN 3.1)

Scientific classification
- Kingdom: Animalia
- Phylum: Chordata
- Class: Actinopterygii
- Order: Blenniiformes
- Family: Blenniidae
- Genus: Istiblennius
- Species: I. meleagris

Binomial name
- Istiblennius meleagris (Valenciennes, 1836)

Synonyms
- Salarias meleagris Valenciennes, 1836; Blennius vittipinnis Castelnau, 1875

= Istiblennius meleagris =

Species of fish

Istiblennius meleagris, the peacock rockskipper, is a species of combtooth blenny found in coral reefs in the western Pacific ocean. It is also known as the white-speckled blenny. Males can reach a maximum of 15 cm (5.9 in) TL, while females can reach a maximum of 10.6 cm (4.2 in) SL.
