= Istiblennius colei =

Conservation status
- Least Concern (IUCN 3.1)

Scientific classification
- Kingdom: Animalia
- Phylum: Chordata
- Class: Actinopterygii
- Order: Blenniiformes
- Family: Blenniidae
- Genus: Istiblennius
- Species: I. colei

Binomial name
- Istiblennius colei (Herre, 1934)

Species of fish

Istiblennius colei is a species of combtooth blenny found in the western Pacific Ocean, around the Philippines. Males of this species can reach a maximum of 11.8 cm (4.6 in) SL, while females reach a maximum of 10.3 cm (4.1 in) SL. The specific name of this blenny honours Howard I. Cole (1892-1966) who was the Chief Chemist for the Philippine Health Service at the leper colony on Culion Island, Philippines, which is the type locality.
