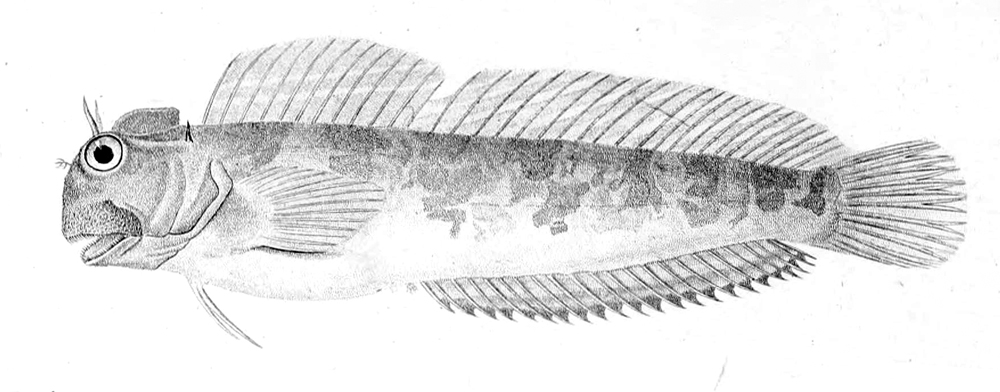
- Rippled Rockskipper (I. edentulus)

Scientific classification
- Kingdom: Animalia
- Phylum: Chordata
- Class: Actinopterygii
- Order: Blenniiformes
- Family: Blenniidae
- Subfamily: Salariinae
- Genus: Istiblennius; Whitley, 1943

Type species
- Salarias muelleri Klunzinger, 1879

= Istiblennius =

Genus of fishes

Istiblennius is a genus of combtooth blennies found in the Pacific and Indian Oceans. The generic name is a compound noun composed of istio the Greek for "sail", referring to the high dorsal fin of the type species, Istiblennius muelleri, and blennius which is derived from a word for "mucus" and refers to the scaleless bodies that characterise the Blenniidae.

== Species ==
The 14 currently recognized species in this genus are:

- Istiblennius bellus (Günther, 1861) (imspringer)
- Istiblennius colei (Herre, 1934)
- Istiblennius dussumieri (Valenciennes, 1836) (streaky rockskipper)
- Istiblennius edentulus (J. R. Forster & J. G. Schneider, 1801) (rippled rockskipper)
- Istiblennius flaviumbrinus (Rüppell, 1830)
- Istiblennius lineatus (Valenciennes, 1836) (lined rockskipper)
- Istiblennius meleagris (Valenciennes, 1836) (peacock rockskipper)
- Istiblennius muelleri (Klunzinger, 1879)
- Istiblennius pox V. G. Springer & J. T. Williams, 1994 (scarface rockskipper)
- Istiblennius rivulatus (Rüppell, 1830)
- Istiblennius spilotus V. G. Springer & J. T. Williams, 1994 (spotted rockskipper)
- Istiblennius steindachneri (Pfeffer, 1893)
- Istiblennius unicolor (Rüppell, 1838) (pallid rockskipper)
- Istiblennius zebra (Vaillant & Sauvage, 1875) (zebra blenny)
