= Istiblennius flaviumbrinus =

Conservation status
- Least Concern (IUCN 3.1)

Scientific classification
- Kingdom: Animalia
- Phylum: Chordata
- Class: Actinopterygii
- Order: Blenniiformes
- Family: Blenniidae
- Genus: Istiblennius
- Species: I. flaviumbrinus

Binomial name
- Istiblennius flaviumbrinus (Rüppell, 1830)

Synonyms
- Salaris flaviumbrinus Rüppell, 1830; Halmablennius flaviumbrinus (Rüppell, 1830); Salarias dama Valenciennes, 1836; Salarias cervus Sauvage, 1880; Blennius dama Hemprich & Ehrenberg, 1899; Halmablennius steinitzii Lotan, 1970

Species of fish

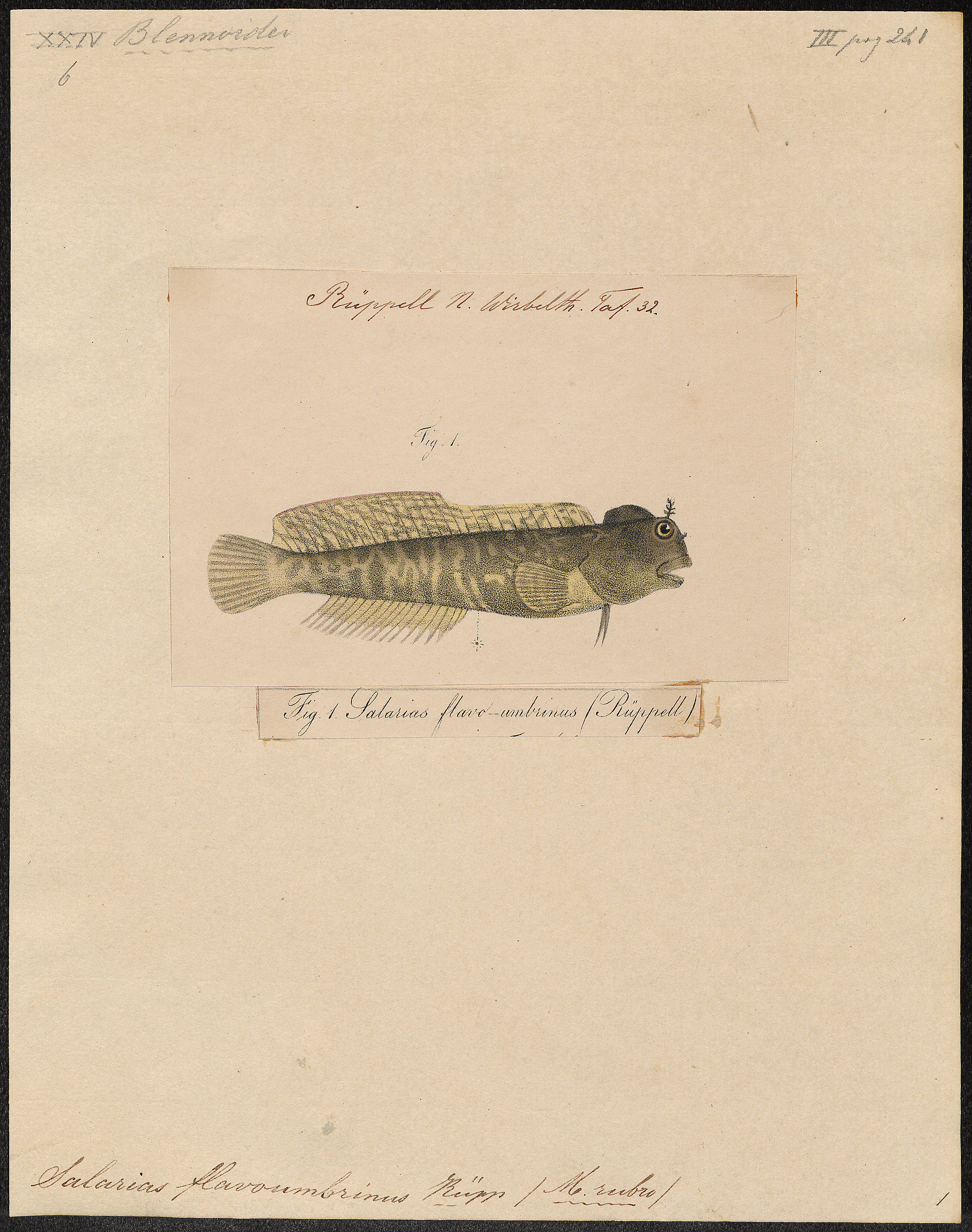
Salarias flavo-umbrinus

Istiblennius flaviumbrinus is a species of combtooth blenny found in the western Indian Ocean, specifically the Red Sea. Males of this species can reach a maximum of 9 cm (3.5 in) SL, while females can reach a maximum of 7.2 cm (2.8 in) SL.
