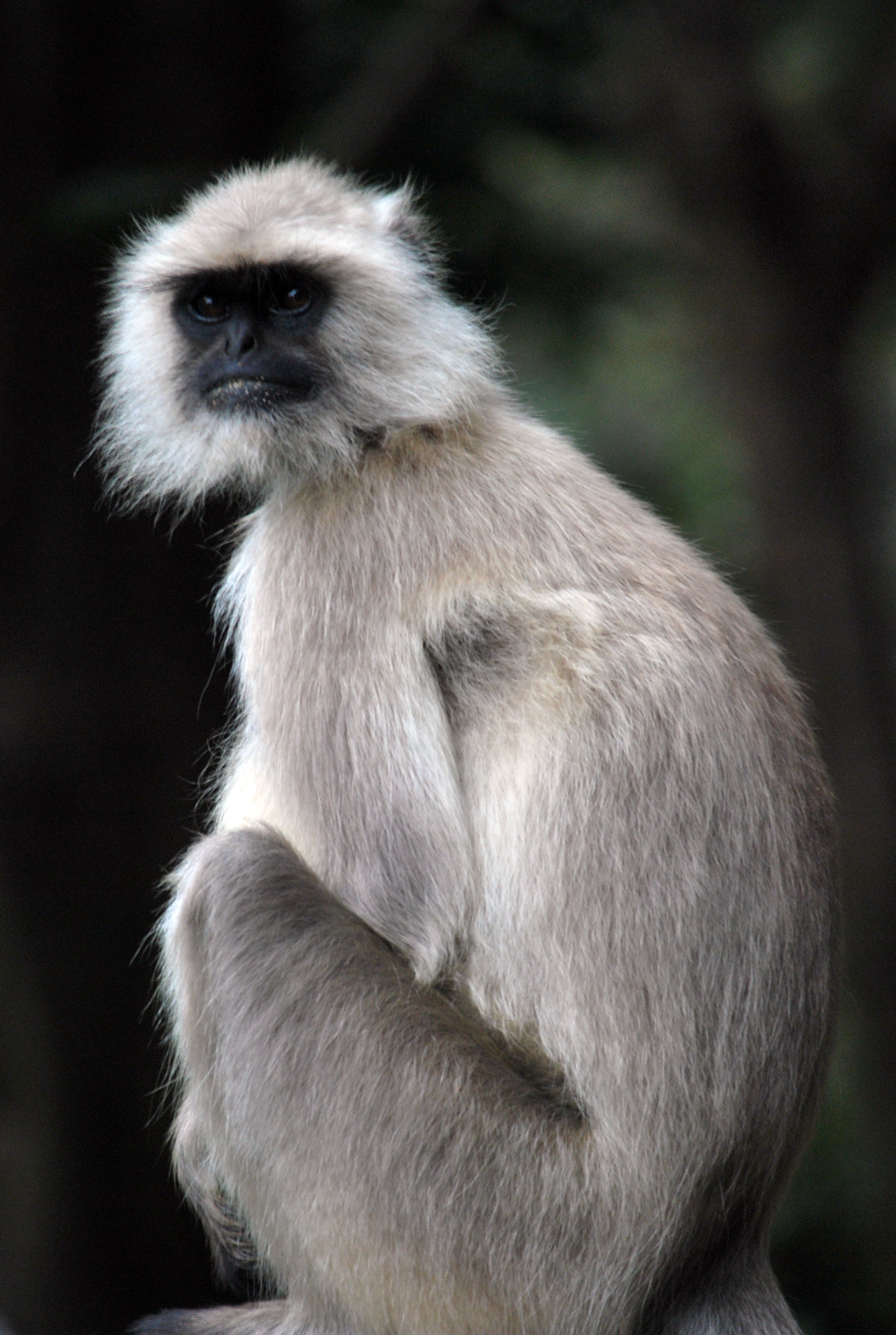

Conservation status
- Least Concern (IUCN 3.1)
- CITES Appendix I

Scientific classification
- Kingdom: Animalia
- Phylum: Chordata
- Class: Mammalia
- Order: Primates
- Family: Cercopithecidae
- Genus: Semnopithecus
- Species: S. entellus

Binomial name
- Semnopithecus entellus (Dufresne, 1797)
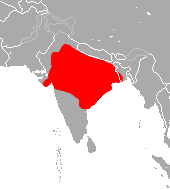
- Northern plains gray langur range

= Northern plains gray langur =

Species of mammal

The northern plains gray langur (Semnopithecus entellus), also known as the sacred langur, Bengal sacred langur and Hanuman langur, is a species of primate in the family Cercopithecidae.

== Taxonomy ==
The northern plains gray langur belongs to the genus Semnopithecus along with the other Indian langurs. The southern plains gray langur was once classified as a subspecies of S. entellus, i.e., S. entellus dussumieri and later regarded as a separate species, i.e., S. dussumieri, but is now regarded as an invalid taxon. Most of the specimens that had been regarded as Semnopithecus dussumieri fall within the revised range of Semnopithecus entellus.

== Description ==
The fur of adults is mostly light colored, with darker fur on the back and limbs, and the face, ears, hands and feet are all black. Infants are brown. Body size excluding tail ranges from 45.1 cm (17.8 in) to 78.4 cm (30.9 in) long, and the tail length is between 80.3 cm (31.6 in) and 111.8 cm (44.0 in). Adult males weigh between 16.9 kg (37 lb) and 19.5 kg (43 lb) while adult females weigh between 9.5 kg (21 lb) and 16.1 kg (35 lb).

== Distribution and habitat ==
The range of the northern plains gray langur covers a large portion of India south of the Himalayas south to the Tapti River and the Krishna River. They have also been reported from Tharparkar in Pakistan. It is thought to have been introduced to western Bangladesh by Hindu pilgrims on the bank of the Jalangi River.

== Behaviour and ecology ==
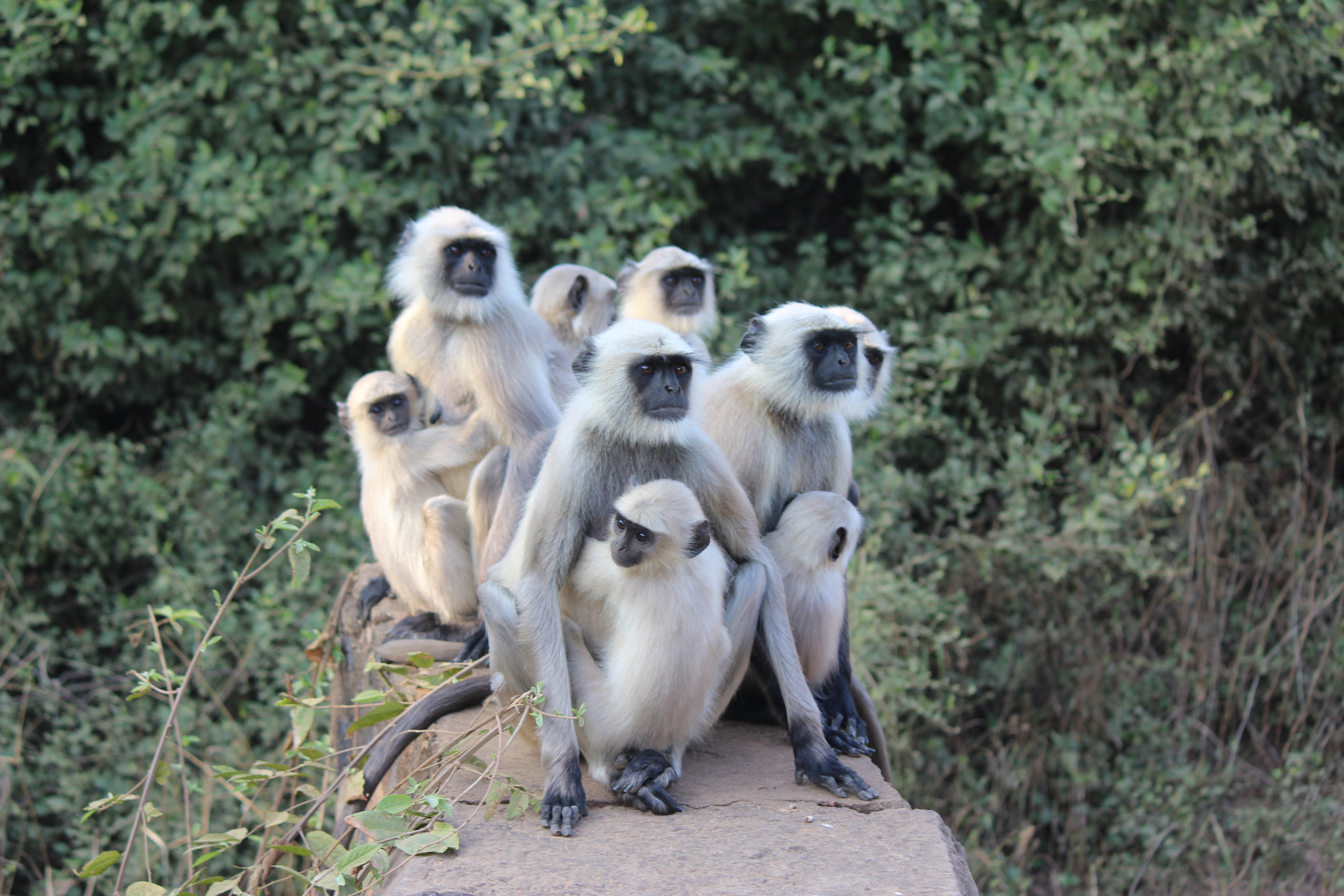
Family perched on concrete ledge

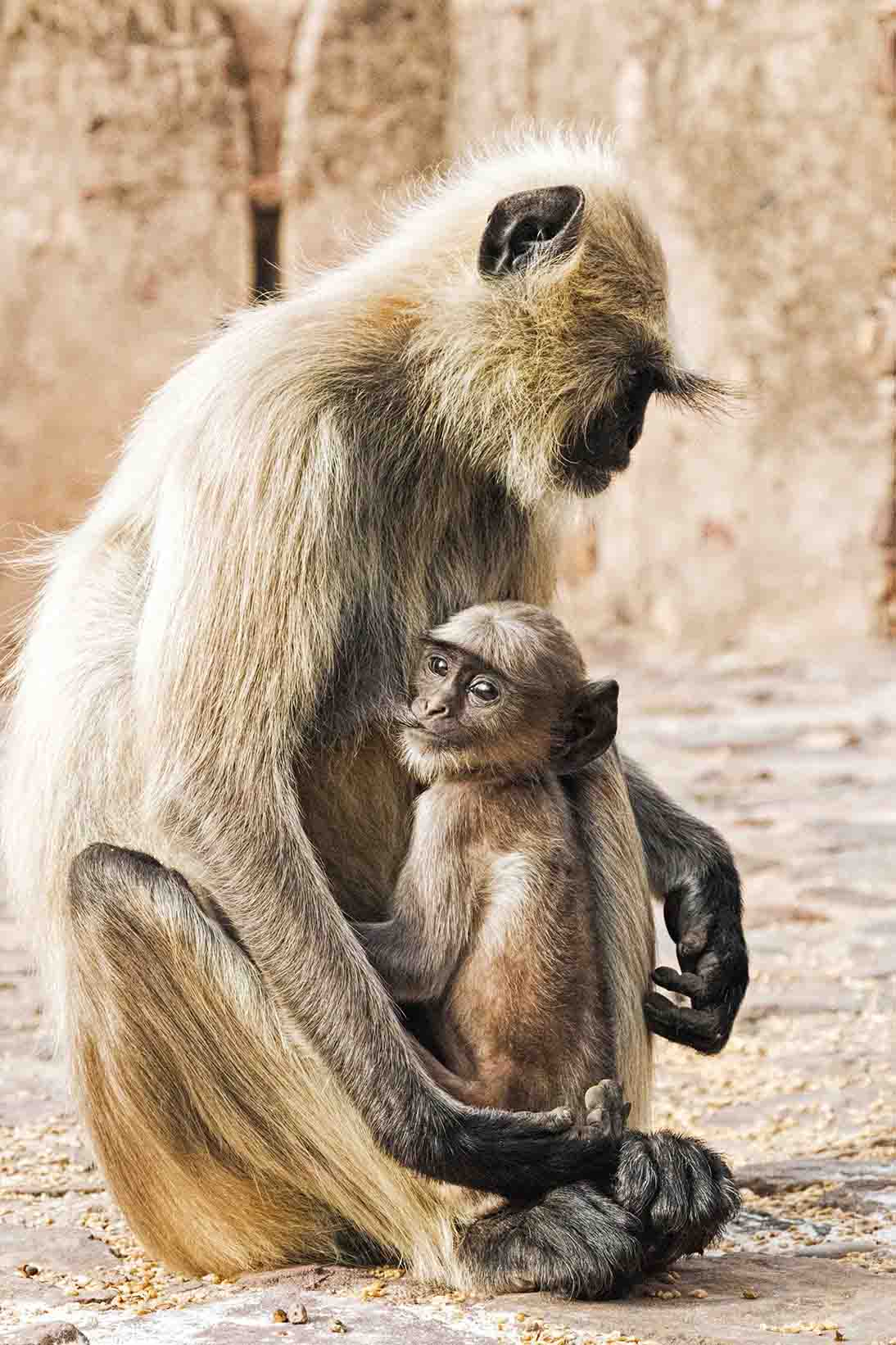
Mother breastfeeding infant in Ranthambore National Park

The northern plains gray langur is diurnal, and is both terrestrial and arboreal. Its natural habitats are subtropical or tropical dry forests and subtropical or tropical dry shrubland. Females groom members of both sexes but males do not groom others.

The northern plains gray langur can live in several different types of groups. It can live in groups of multiple males and females, one male and multiple females or multiple males with no females, and males can also live alone without a group. Single male groups are most common. Group size can exceed 100 monkeys. Upon reaching maturity, males typically emigrate from their natal group while females typically remain. Young adult females are typically dominant over older females. When a new male takes over a group it may engage in infanticide of young fathered by the previous male or males, but this is less common when the takeover occurs slowly over several months.

The northern plains gray langur eats primarily fruits and leaves. It is able to survive on mature leaves, which is a key to its ability to survive throughout the dry season. It also eats seeds, flowers, buds, bark and insects, including caterpillars. It is also fed fruits and vegetables by humans, and some groups get a substantial portion of their diets from food provided by temples and from raiding crops.

Groups that have access to abundant food year-round, for example those that are provisioned by temples or are able to raid crops year-round, also breed throughout the year. Other groups, such as those living in forests, typically give birth between December and May. The gestation period is about 200 days. Females other than the mother alloparent the infant for the first month of its life. Weaning occurs at about 1 year and males reach maturity at about 6 to 7 year old.

The northern plains gray langur often associates with chital deer. Both species respond to each other's alarm calls. The chital seem to benefit from the vigilance of male langurs watching for predators in the trees, while the langurs seem to benefit from the chital's better senses of smell and hearing. It also has been observed engaging in grooming sessions with rhesus macaques.

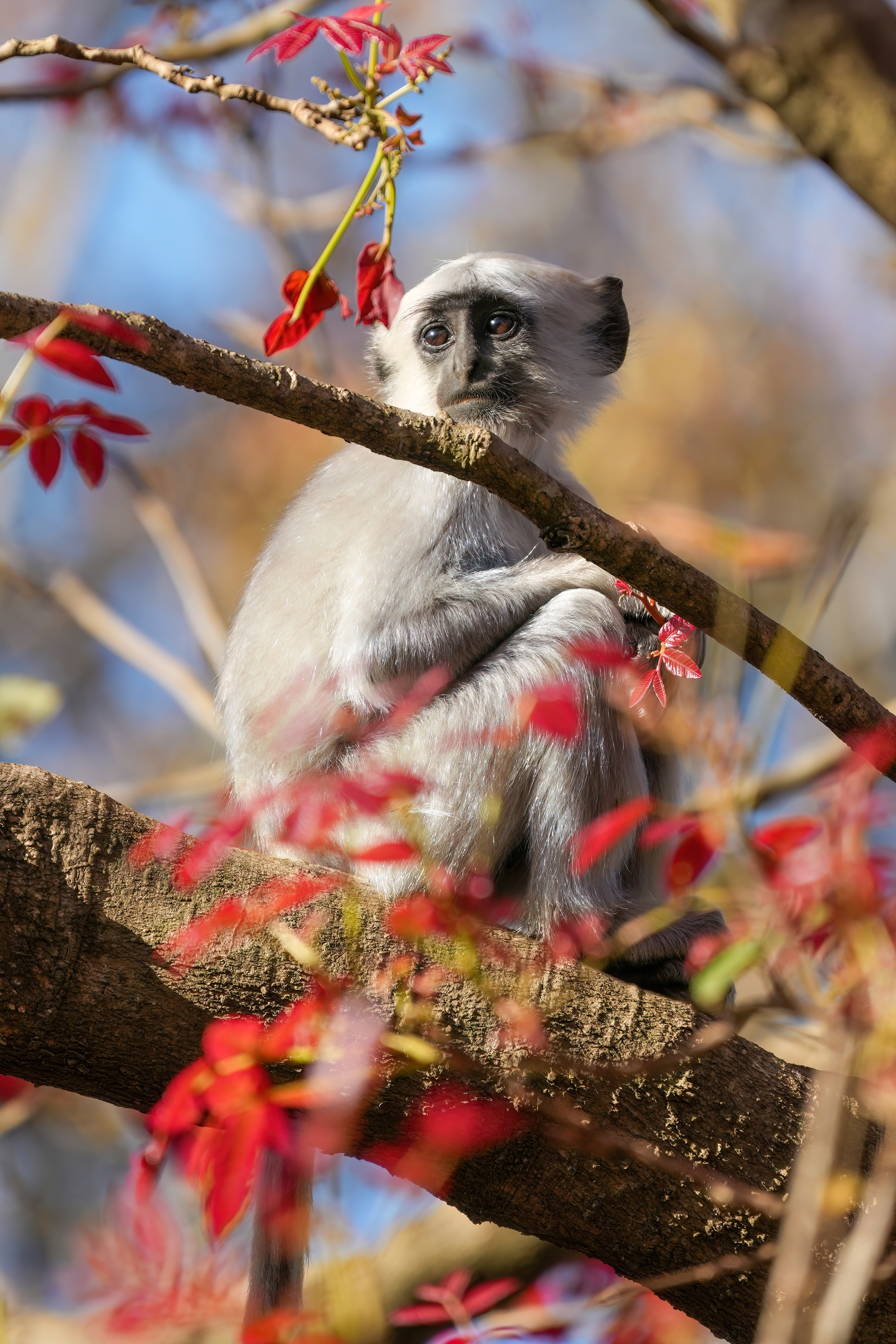
Juvenile northern plains gray langur in Jim Corbett National Park

== Conservation ==
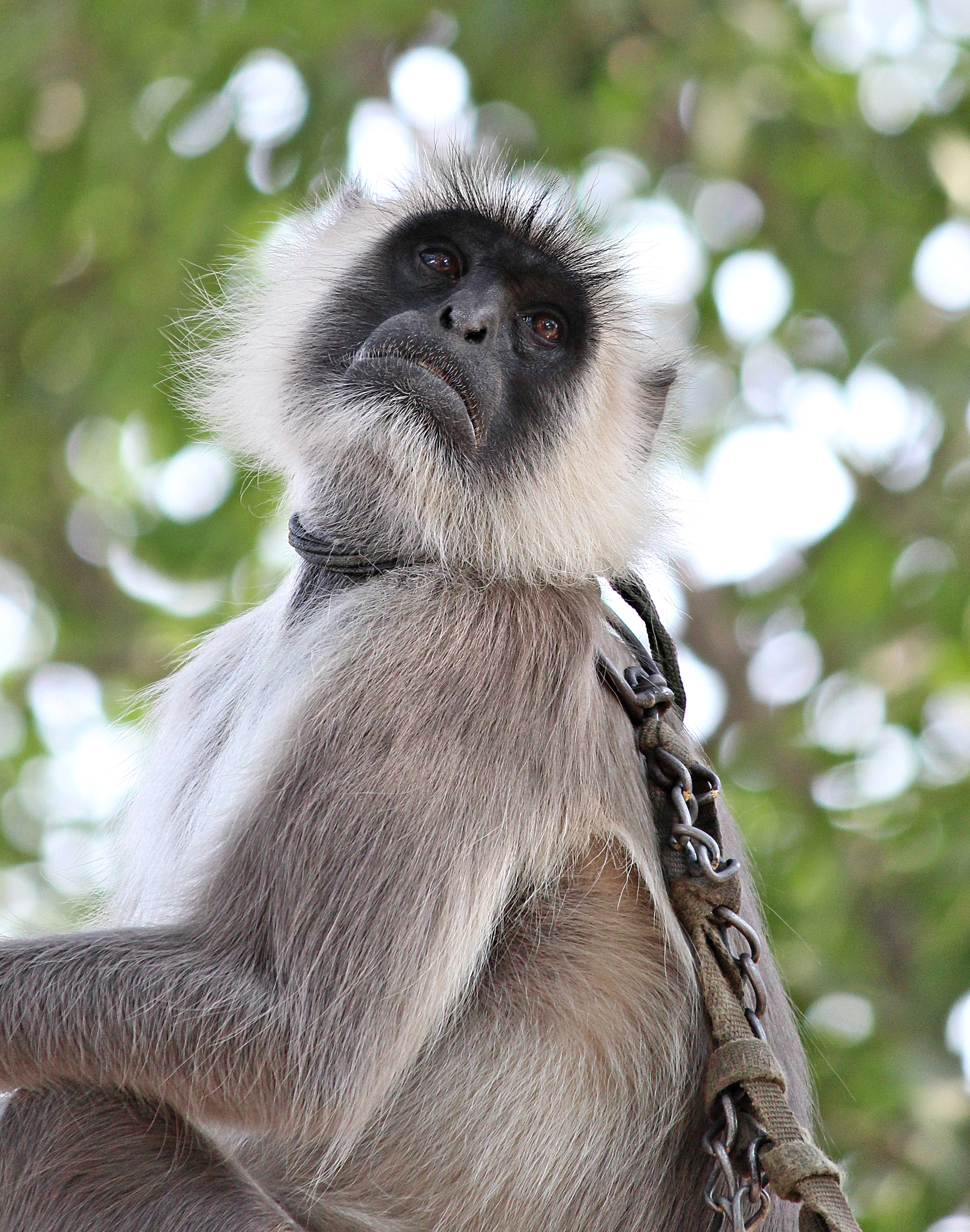
A captive gray langur. According to the Indian Wild Life (Protection) Act, 1972, it is illegal to hold the species in captivity.

The northern plains gray langur is listed as least concern on the IUCN Red List, it is threatened by habitat loss. The northern plains gray langur adapts to many habitats and the Hindu religion considers the northern plains gray langur to be sacred. Hence it has large population within India, including within towns and cities. It is subject to some threats, including road kill, attacks by dogs, forest fires and diseases caught from domestic animals. It is sometimes hunted for food, especially within the states of Odisha and Andhra Pradesh and is sometimes killed by humans to prevent it from raiding crops.

Captive gray langurs are used in Delhi to scare off rhesus macaques, which steal from and sometimes attack people.

== Gallery ==
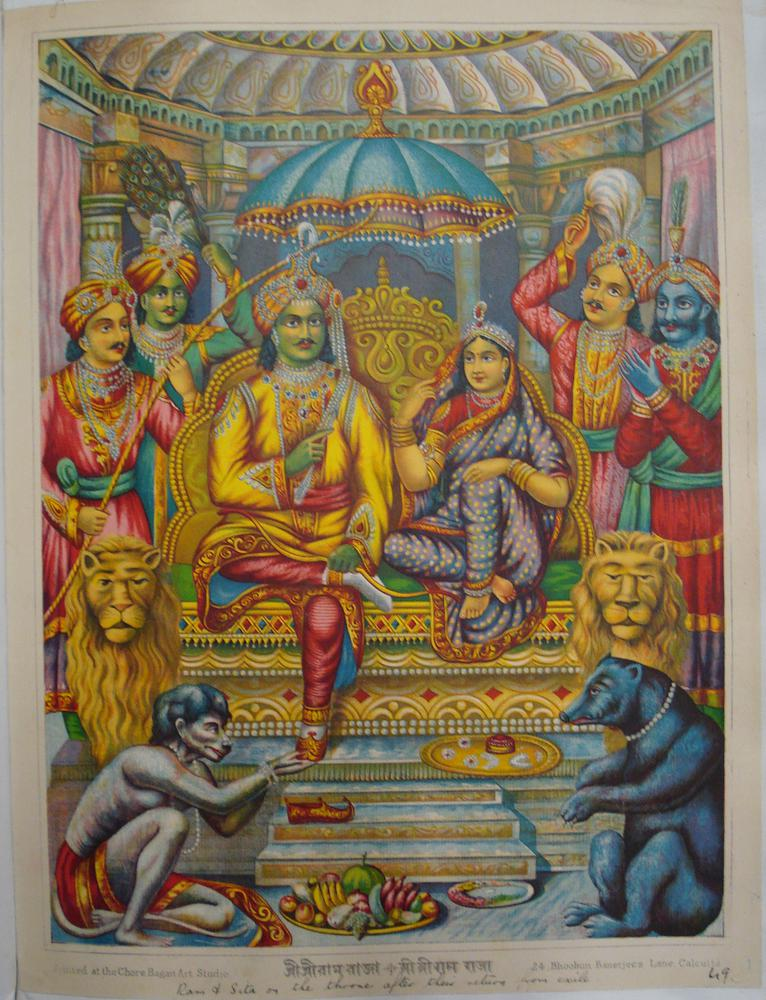
Late 19th century lithograph from Bengal, depicting Rama & Sita enthroned, surrounded by Lakshmana, Bharata, Shatrughna & Vibhishana. A notable feature of Bengal art is depiction of Hanuman based on the anthropomorphised version of the native grey langur species, as opposed to that based on the rhesus macaque native to upper Gangetic plains & Jambavan based on the Himalayan black bear.

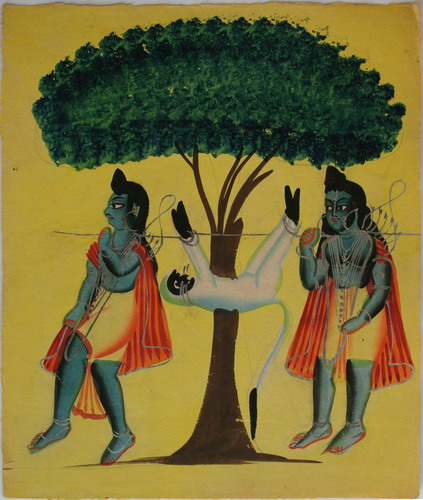
Kalighat painting of the same period depicting Hanuman (whose appearance is based on the grey langur) being taken captive by Lava & Kusha, an event from the Uttarakanda of the Hindu epic Ramayana.

== Predation ==
Predators of northern plains gray langurs include Asian black bears, jungle cats and leopard cats.
