= Istiblennius muelleri =

Conservation status
- Least Concern (IUCN 3.1)

Scientific classification
- Kingdom: Animalia
- Phylum: Chordata
- Class: Actinopterygii
- Order: Blenniiformes
- Family: Blenniidae
- Genus: Istiblennius
- Species: I. muelleri

Binomial name
- Istiblennius muelleri (Klunzinger, 1879)

Synonyms
- Salarias muelleri Klunzinger, 1879

Species of fish

Istiblennius muelleri, Mueller's rockskipper, is a species of combtooth blenny found in the western Pacific ocean. Males of this species can reach a maximum of 7 cm (2.8 in) SL, while females can reach a maximum of 5.5 cm (2.2 in) SL. The specific zoology honours the German-Australian physician, geographer, and botanist Ferdinand von Mueller (1825-1896).
