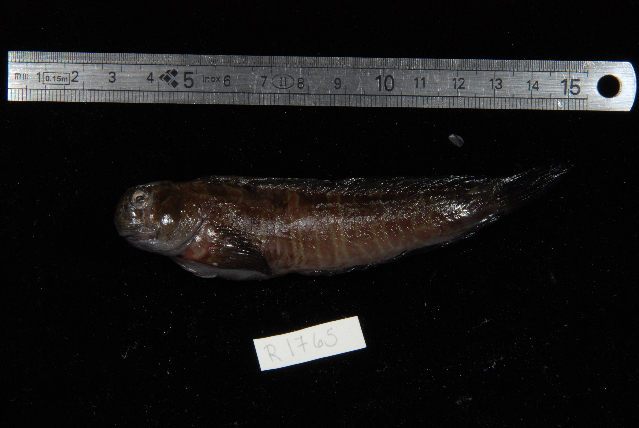

Conservation status
- Least Concern (IUCN 3.1)

Scientific classification
- Kingdom: Animalia
- Phylum: Chordata
- Class: Actinopterygii
- Order: Blenniiformes
- Family: Blenniidae
- Genus: Istiblennius
- Species: I. bellus

Binomial name
- Istiblennius bellus (Günther, 1861)

Synonyms
- Salarias bellus Günther, 1861; Salarias kellersi Fowler, 1932; Salarias leopardus Fowler, 1938; Salarias personatus Fowler, 1945; Istiblennius impudens J. L. B. Smith, 1959

= Istiblennius bellus =

Species of fish

Istiblennius bellus, the imspringer, is a species of combtooth blenny found in coral reefs in the Pacific and western Indian Ocean. It is also known as the beautiful rockskipper or the dusky blenny. Males of this species can reach a maximum of 16 cm (6.3 in) SL, while females reach a maximum of 13.1 cm (5.2 in) SL.
