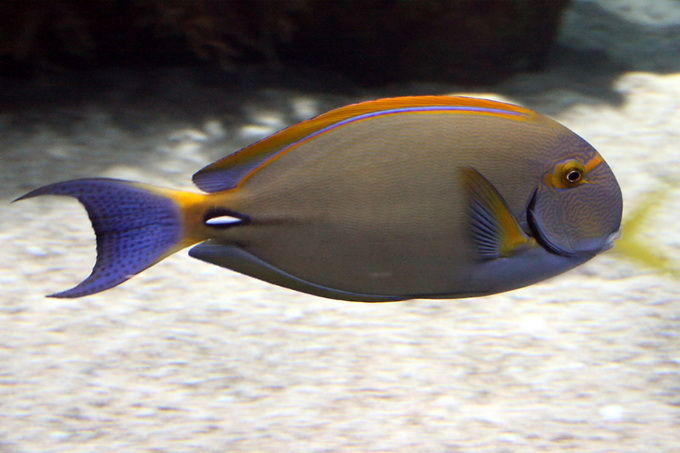

Conservation status
- Least Concern (IUCN 3.1)

Scientific classification
- Kingdom: Animalia
- Phylum: Chordata
- Class: Actinopterygii
- Order: Acanthuriformes
- Family: Acanthuridae
- Genus: Acanthurus
- Species: A. dussumieri

Binomial name
- Acanthurus dussumieri Valenciennes, 1835

Synonyms
- List: Acanthurus lamarrii Valenciennes, 1835; Acanthurus undulatus Valenciennes, 1835; Hepatus dussumieri (Valenciennes, 1835); Rhombotides dussumieri (Valenciennes, 1835); Rhombotides lamarrii (Valenciennes, 1835); Teuthis dussumieri (Valenciennes, 1835)

= Acanthurus dussumieri =

Species of fish

Acanthurus dussumieri, commonly known as Dussumier's surgeonfish, the eye-stripe surgeonfish or the ornate surgeonfish, is a ray-finned fish from the Indo-Pacific. It occasionally makes its way into the aquarium trade. It grows to a maximum length of 54 cm (21 in) but 35 cm (14 in) is a more usual size.

The specific name honours the French explorer and trader Jean-Jacques Dussumier (1792-1883).

== Description ==
Acanthurus dussumieri is a deep-bodied, laterally-compressed oval fish with a maximum length of 54 cm (21 in). The head is small, with slightly prominent eyes, a small beak-like mouth and inflated, pale lips. The body is smooth, being covered with small scales, but like other surgeon-fish, it has a pair of scalpel-like, modified scales on the caudal peduncle; these can either be folded flat or raised in defence. Both dorsal and anal fins are long, and the pectoral fins are used for locomotion and balance. The throat is blue, and the rest of the head has a dense network of blue or grey-blue lines, which are wider than the fine grey-blue, wavy, longitudinal lines on the pale brownish body. There is a broad orange bar above the eyes and a narrow orange band borders the base of the dorsal fin. The scalpel-like scales are white and are surrounded by a black blotch. The caudal fin is crescent-shaped, dark blue speckled with black apart from a pale base. Along with Acanthurus mata and Acanthurus xanthopterus, it is one of the largest species of surgeonfish.

Juvenile fish are greyish with yellow and black caudal fins at first, but the body colour becomes dark brown later. As they grow the body colour lightens and the longitudinal wavy lines and facial patterning begin to appear.

== Distribution and habitat ==
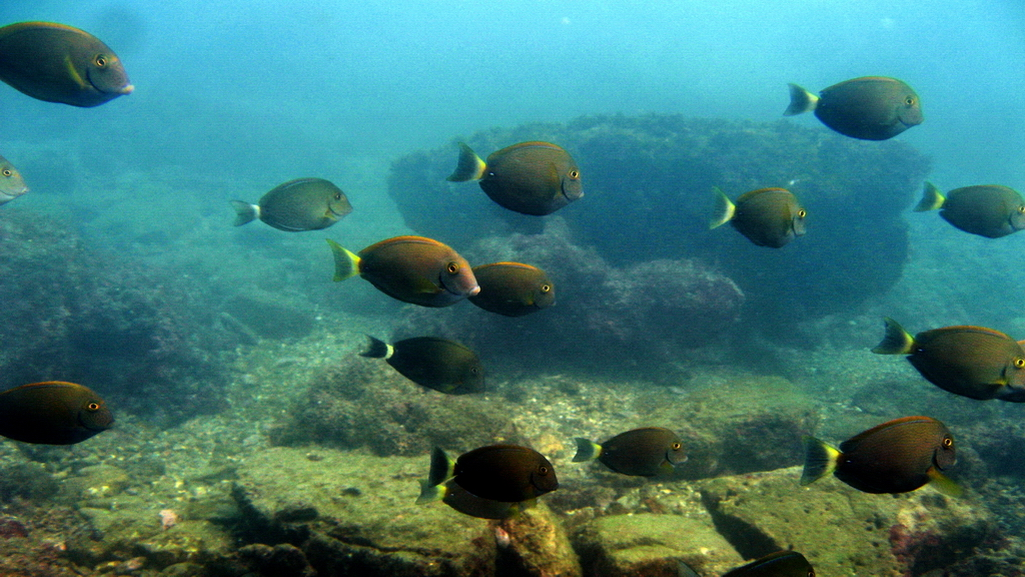
Juveniles schooling in the shallows of Waimushan, Kee-Lung, Taiwan.

This surgeonfish has a widespread distribution in the tropical and sub-tropical Indian Ocean and the West Pacific Ocean. Its range extends from East Africa to southern Japan, Indonesia and eastern Australia, at depths down to about 130 m (427 ft). It occurs in lagoons, on reefs, on reef slopes, and in inter-reef areas with sand or rubble substrates or rock. Juveniles and young adults are mostly associated with reefs.

== Ecology ==
Acanthurus dussumieri feeds on algae and detritus. Its diet includes the algal film that grows on rocks and other surfaces as well as diatoms and planktonic particles. The reproduction of this fish has been little studied. Adults are either solitary or occur in small groups but juveniles form shoals.

== Gallery ==
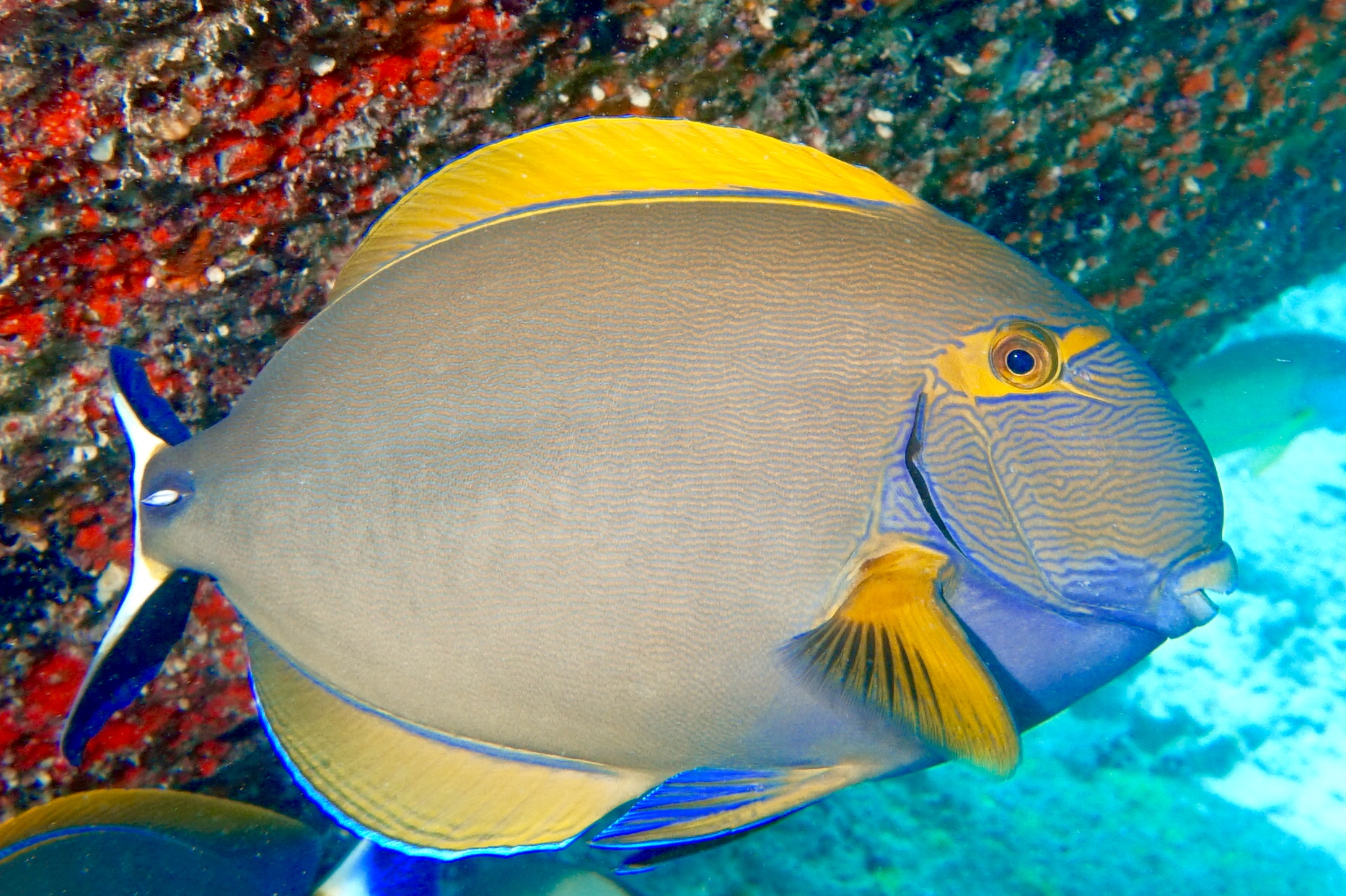

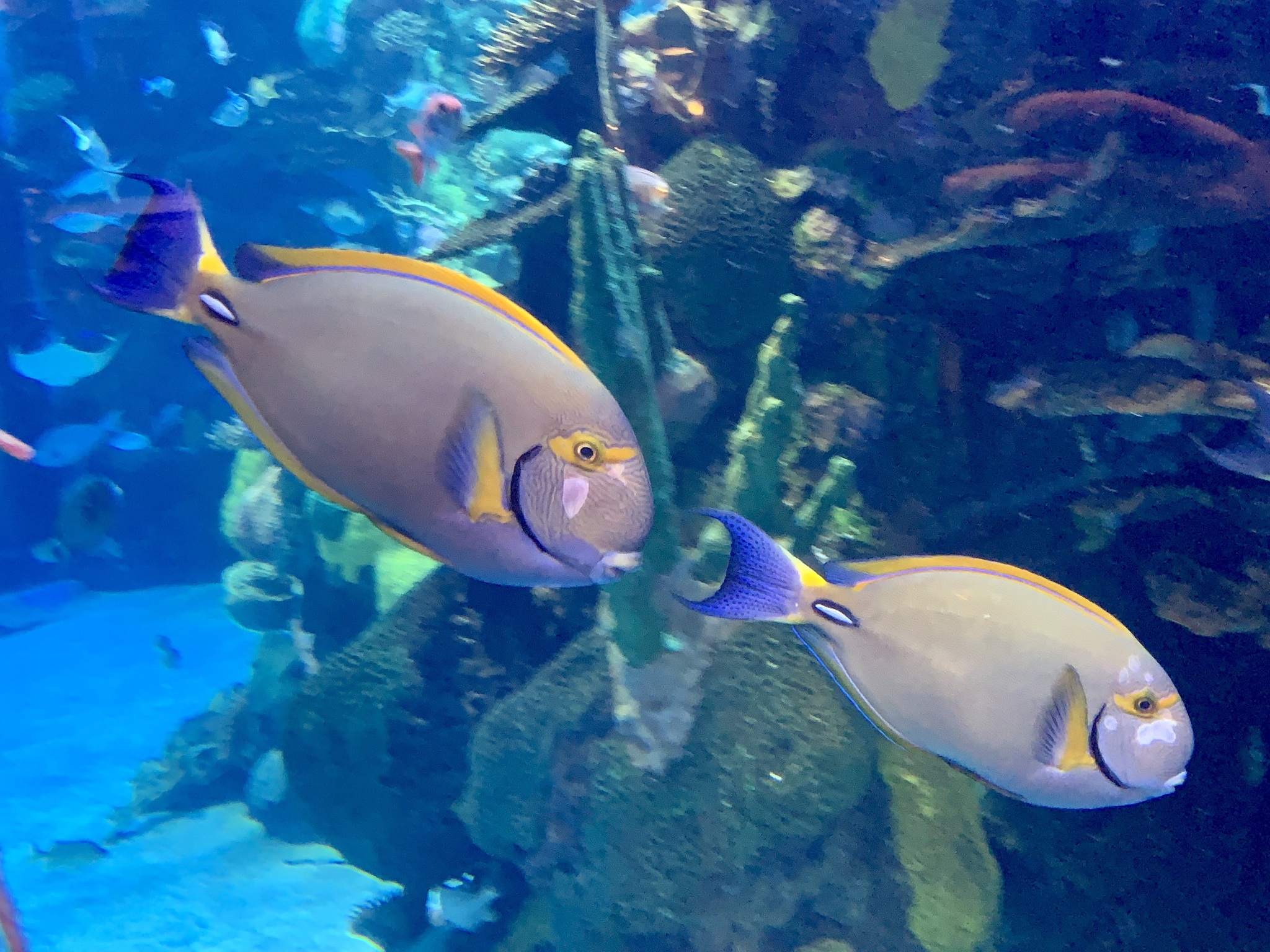

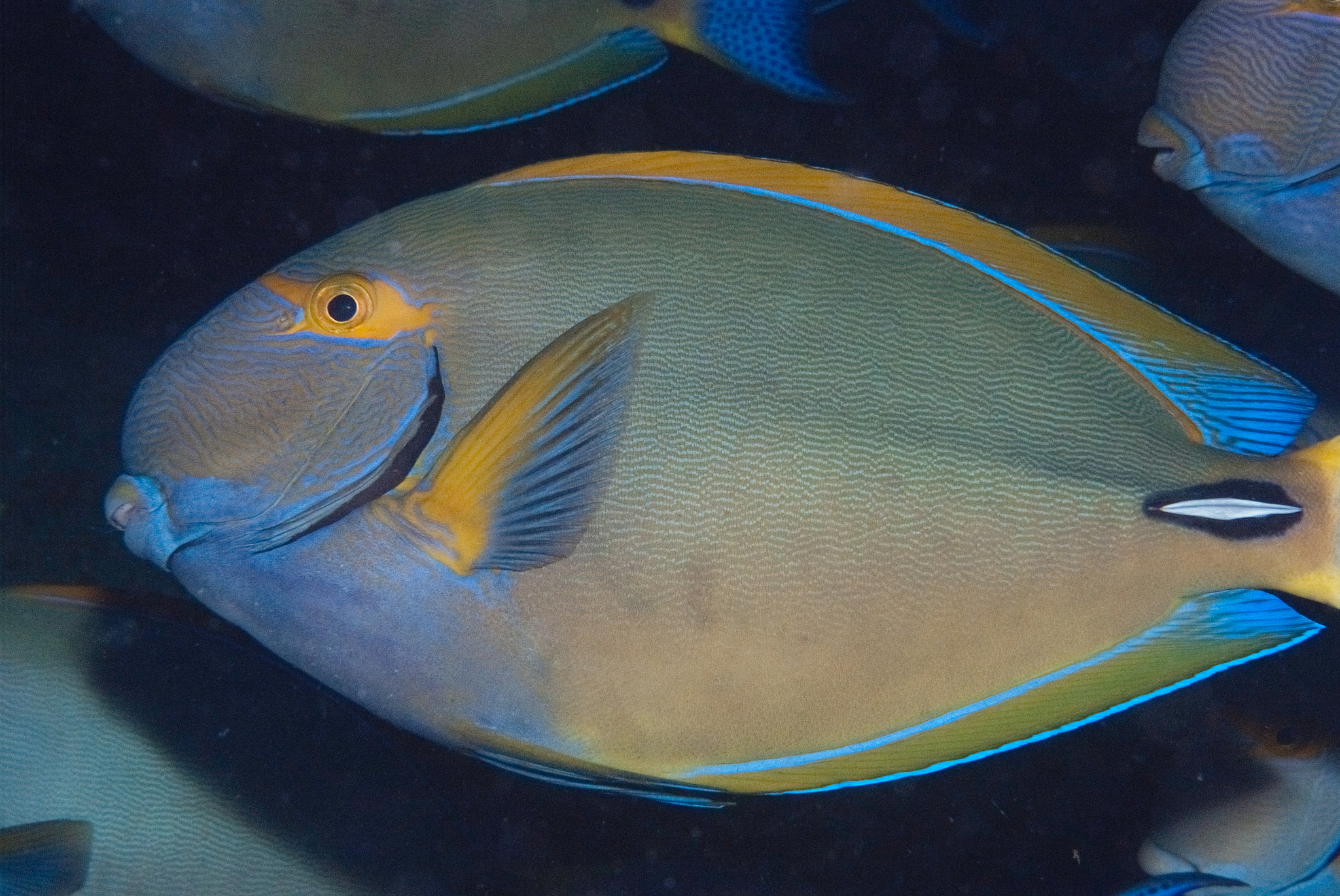
