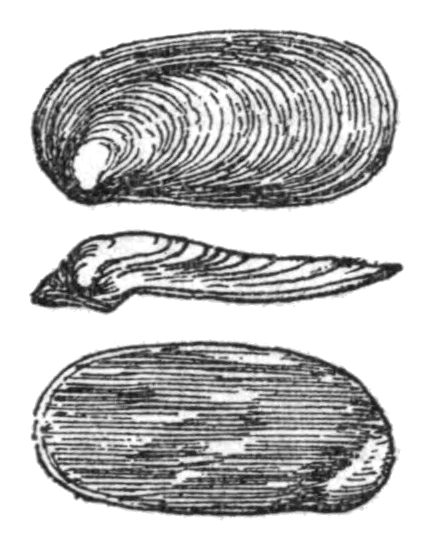
- Drawing of the internal shell of Mariaella beddomei.

Scientific classification
- Domain: Eukaryota
- Kingdom: Animalia
- Phylum: Mollusca
- Class: Gastropoda
- Order: Stylommatophora
- Family: Ariophantidae
- Genus: Mariaella; Gray, 1855

= Mariaella =

Genus of gastropods

Mariaella is a genus of air-breathing land slugs, a terrestrial pulmonate gastropod mollusks in the family Ariophantidae.

Species from genus Mariaella are also pests on vanilla.

== Species ==
Species in the genus Mariaella include:

- Mariaella beddomei (Godwin-Austen, 1888)
- Mariaella dussumieri (Gray, 1855) - type species

== Distribution ==
India.

Western Ghats, from Mahableshwar southwards, and hill-country of Ceylon.

== Shell description ==
The shell is internal, solid, ovate, convex above, flatly concave beneath, with a small apex, not coiled, lying on the right side as seen from about near the end.

== Anatomy ==
The animal very similar to that of Girasia, but the lobes of the mantle united into an oval shield, tricarinate above and completely covering the shell, only a small pinhole-like orifice near the posterior end being left open. From this small orifice a distinct line or cicatrix runs to the pneumostome (the respiratory aperture) on the right side, marking the dividing line of the right and left shell-lobes. The mantle extends forward over the neck, but not behind the shield, which is sunk behind in a depression of the back. The body behind the shield is sharply keeled above and terminates in a large mucous pore. Peripodial groove distinct as usual, but narrow, and sole tripartite longitudinally.

Genitalia and odontophore much resembling those of Girasia. From Girasia the present genus is separated by its almost imperforate shield, the more solid shell of different form, and by several small distinctions in the genitalia.

Reproductive system: The dart-sac is long and cylindrical. There is a large swelling of the free oviduct (ovitheca) just beyond the point where the vas deferens is given off. The spermatheca is rather irregularly ovate, and increases in size when containing numerous spermatophores. The penis is provided with a small kalc-sac and gives off a short caecum. The retractor muscle is attached to the bend.

The radula has a broad band of wider median teeth, tricuspid as a rule, and these pass into bicuspid outer laterals, with the two cusps subequal and terminal as in Girasia.
