= Istiblennius rivulatus =

Conservation status
- Least Concern (IUCN 3.1)

Scientific classification
- Kingdom: Animalia
- Phylum: Chordata
- Class: Actinopterygii
- Order: Blenniiformes
- Family: Blenniidae
- Genus: Istiblennius
- Species: I. rivulatus

Binomial name
- Istiblennius rivulatus (Rüppell, 1830)

Synonyms
- Salarias rivulatus Rüppell, 1830; Salarias oryx Valenciennes, 1836; Alticops oryx (Valenciennes, 1836)

Species of fish

Istiblennius rivulatus is a species of combtooth blenny found on coral reefs in the western Indian Ocean. Males of this species can reach a maximum of 8.6 cm (3.4 in) in standard length, while females can reach a maximum of 9.3 cm (3.7 in) in standard length.
