= Istiblennius steindachneri =

Conservation status
- Least Concern (IUCN 3.1)

Scientific classification
- Kingdom: Animalia
- Phylum: Chordata
- Class: Actinopterygii
- Order: Blenniiformes
- Family: Blenniidae
- Genus: Istiblennius
- Species: I. steindachneri

Binomial name
- Istiblennius steindachneri (Pfeffer, 1893)

Synonyms
- Salarias steindachneri Pfeffer, 1893

Species of fish

Istiblennius steindachneri is a species of combtooth blenny found in the western Indian Ocean. It can reach a maximum of 11 cm (4.3 in) in SL. The identity of the person honoured in this blenny's specific name was not stated by Pfeffer in his description but it is almost certainly the Austrian ichthyologist Franz Steindachner (1834-1919).
