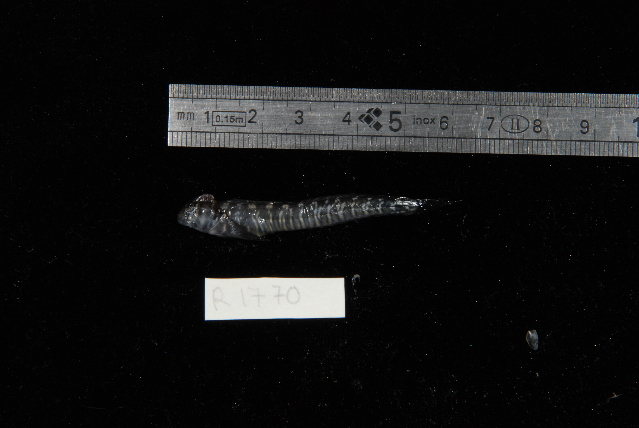

Conservation status
- Least Concern (IUCN 3.1)

Scientific classification
- Kingdom: Animalia
- Phylum: Chordata
- Class: Actinopterygii
- Order: Blenniiformes
- Family: Blenniidae
- Genus: Istiblennius
- Species: I. spilotus

Binomial name
- Istiblennius spilotus V. G. Springer & J. T. Williams, 1994

= Istiblennius spilotus =

Species of fish

Istiblennius spilotus, the spotted rockskipper, is a species of combtooth blenny found in the western Indian Ocean. Males of this species can reach a maximum of 14 cm (5.5 in) TL, while females can reach a maximum length of 9.7 cm (3.8 in) SL.
