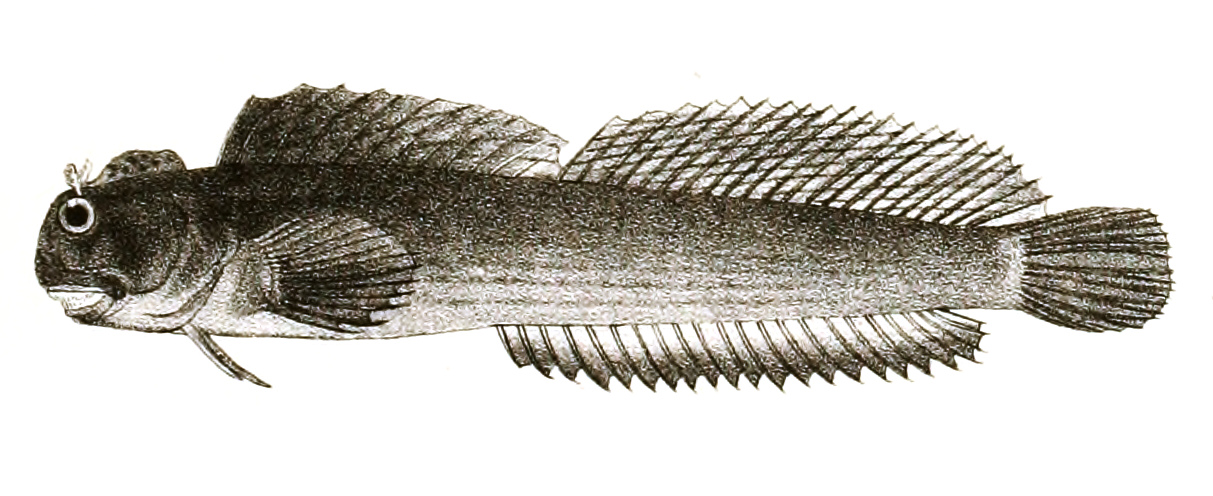

Conservation status
- Least Concern (IUCN 3.1)

Scientific classification
- Kingdom: Animalia
- Phylum: Chordata
- Class: Actinopterygii
- Order: Blenniiformes
- Family: Blenniidae
- Genus: Istiblennius
- Species: I. lineatus

Binomial name
- Istiblennius lineatus (Valenciennes, 1836)

Synonyms
- Salarias lineatus Valenciennes, 1836; Halmablennius lineatus (Valenciennes, 1836); Salarias kingii Valenciennes, 1836; Salarias hasseltii Bleeker, 1851; Salarias lividus Thiollière, 1857; Salarias mccullochi Fowler & Bean, 1923; Salarias multilineatus Fowler, 1945

= Istiblennius lineatus =

Species of fish

Istiblennius lineatus, the lined rockskipper, is a species of combtooth blenny found in coral reefs in the Pacific and Indian oceans. It is also commonly known as the lined blenny, black-lined blenny, or thin-lined rockskipper. It can reach a maximum of 15 cm (5.9 in) TL. This species can be found in the aquarium trade.
