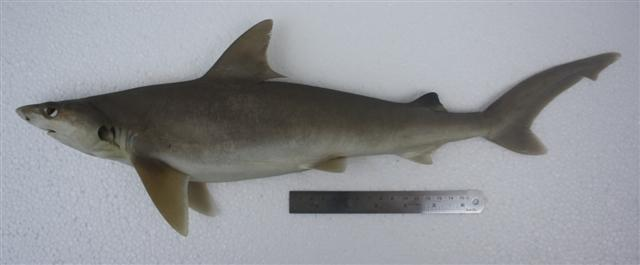

Conservation status
- Endangered (IUCN 3.1)

Scientific classification
- Kingdom: Animalia
- Phylum: Chordata
- Class: Chondrichthyes
- Subclass: Elasmobranchii
- Division: Selachii
- Order: Carcharhiniformes
- Family: Carcharhinidae
- Genus: Carcharhinus
- Species: C. dussumieri

Binomial name
- Carcharhinus dussumieri (J. P. Müller & Henle, 1839)
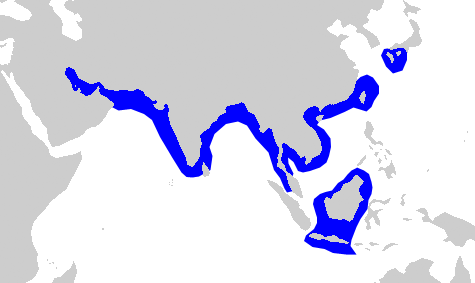
- Range of whitecheek shark

Synonyms
- Carcharias malabaricus; Carcharias dussumieri; Eulamia dussumieri; Squalus dussumieri

= Whitecheek shark =

Species of shark

The whitecheek shark or widemouth blackspot shark (Carcharhinus dussumieri) is a requiem shark of the family Carcharhinidae, found in the Indo-West Pacific Ocean between latitudes 34°N and 25°S. It can reach a length of 1 m (39 in). It feeds mainly on fish, cephalopods, and crustaceans. It is a viviparous species, with the female giving birth to up to four live young.

The specific name honours the French explorer and trader Jean-Jacques Dussumier (1792–1883).

== Description ==
The whitecheek shark grows to a length around 100 cm (39 in). It has a slender body and long head with a rounded snout. The eyes are oval and both jaws have multiple rows of backward-pointing, serrated teeth. The pectoral fins are long, narrow, and curved and have narrow, pointed tips. The first dorsal fin is triangular, uncurved, and moderately sized, and the second dorsal fin is much smaller than the first and bears a large black patch at its apex. The whitecheek shark's dorsal (upper) surface is grey or brownish-grey, while its ventral (under) surface is pale.

== Distribution ==
The whitecheek shark is native to the Indo-Pacific Ocean, where it is found on continental shelves and inshore slopes around islands down to about 170 m (560 ft). Its range extends from the Arabian Sea and Persian Gulf to Java, Indonesia, Japan, and Australia.

== Behaviour ==
The whitecheek shark mostly feeds on fish, but also eats octopus, squid, and various crustaceans including crabs. It sometimes picks off molluscs and worms from the seabed.

It is a common species, but not well known, and it is sometimes confused with the blackspot shark (Carcharhinus sealei). Both males and females mature when they are about 70 cm (28 in) long. Females are viviparous and breeding takes place throughout the year, with females normally being either pregnant or having recently given birth. One to four, but usually two, pups are retained in the uterus, where they feed from a yolk sac. They are about 38 cm (15 in) at the time of birth.

== Status ==
The IUCN lists the whitecheek shark as near threatened in its Red List of Threatened Species because it is often caught in shallow-water fisheries by rod and line, gillnetting, and trawling. Its population trend seems to be decreasing and it is facing local extinction in some parts of its range. It is usually caught as bycatch rather than as the target species, and in Australian waters, makes up around 2–3% of the total biomass caught. It is not harmful to man and its flesh is marketed for human consumption.
