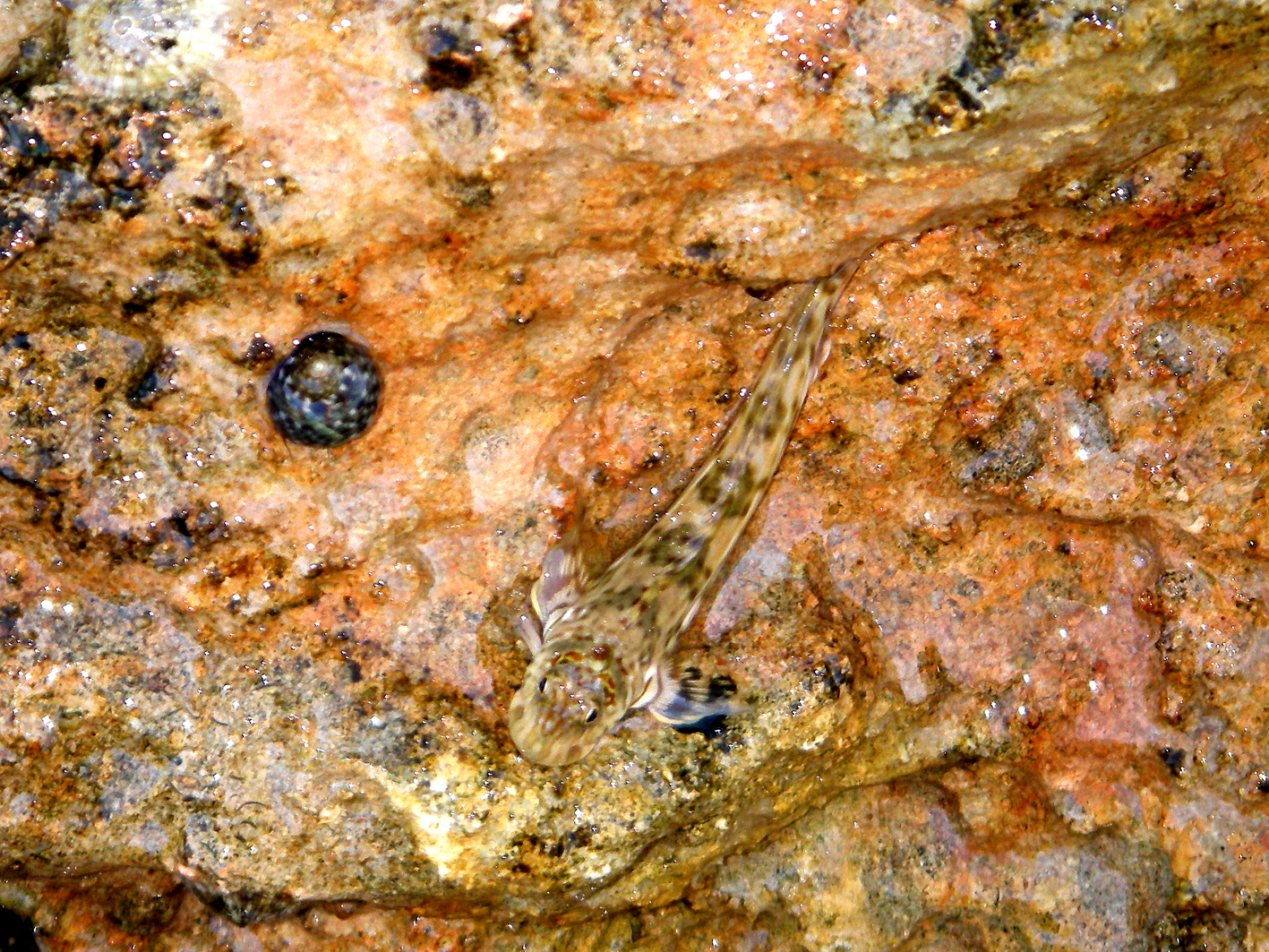

Conservation status
- Least Concern (IUCN 3.1)

Scientific classification
- Kingdom: Animalia
- Phylum: Chordata
- Class: Actinopterygii
- Order: Blenniiformes
- Family: Blenniidae
- Genus: Istiblennius
- Species: I. unicolor

Binomial name
- Istiblennius unicolor (Rüppell, 1838)

Synonyms
- Salarias unicolor Rüppell, 1838; Halmablennius unicolor (Rüppell, 1838)

= Istiblennius unicolor =

Species of fish

Istiblennius unicolor, the pallid rockskipper, is a species of combtooth blenny found on coral reefs in the western Indian Ocean. Males of this species can reach a maximum standard length of 10.2 cm (4.0 in), while females can reach a maximum length of 9.2 cm (3.6 in).
