= Istiblennius pox =

Conservation status
- Least Concern (IUCN 3.1)

Scientific classification
- Kingdom: Animalia
- Phylum: Chordata
- Class: Actinopterygii
- Order: Blenniiformes
- Family: Blenniidae
- Genus: Istiblennius
- Species: I. pox

Binomial name
- Istiblennius pox V. G. Springer & J. T. Williams, 1994

Species of fish

Istiblennius pox, the scarface rockskipper, is a species of combtooth blenny found in the western Indian Ocean. It can reach a maximum of 13 cm (5.1 in) TL.
