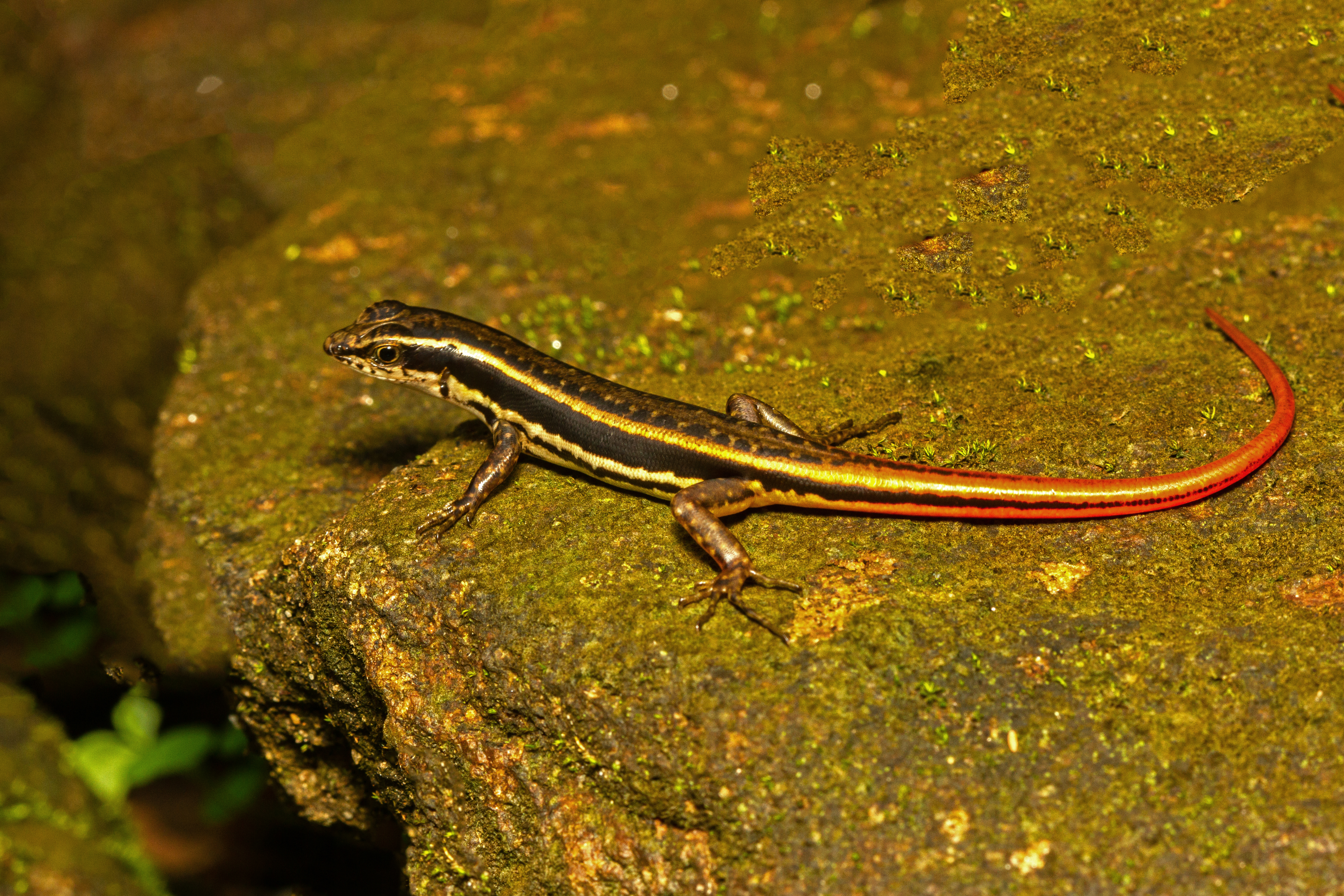

Conservation status
- Least Concern (IUCN 3.1)

Scientific classification
- Kingdom: Animalia
- Phylum: Chordata
- Class: Reptilia
- Order: Squamata
- Family: Scincidae
- Genus: Sphenomorphus
- Species: S. dussumieri

Binomial name
- Sphenomorphus dussumieri (A.M.C. Duméril & Bibron, 1839)
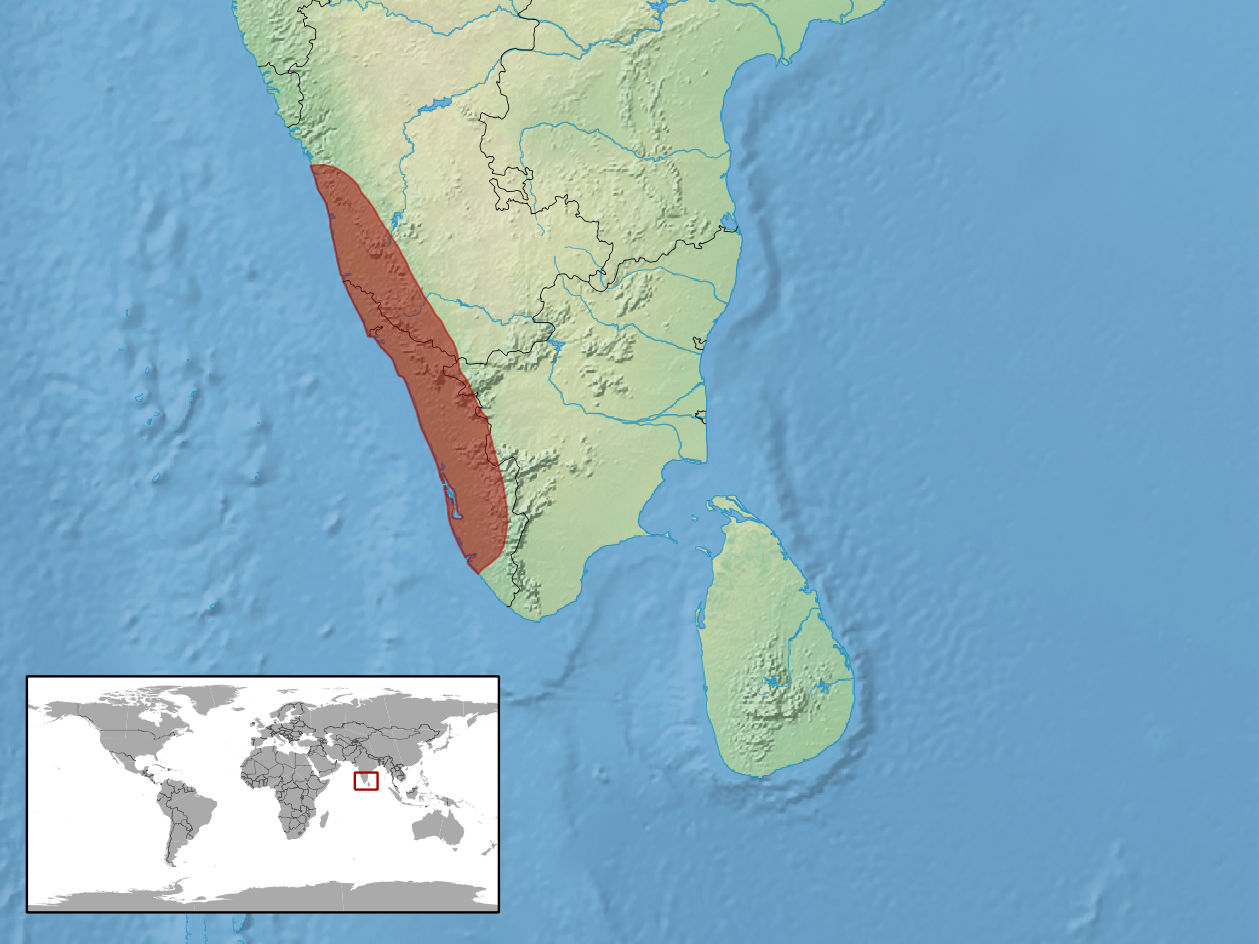

Synonyms
- Lygosoma dussumierii A.M.C. Duméril & Bibron, 1839; Eumeces dussumieri — Beddome, 1870; Hinulia dussumieri — Stoliczka, 1872; Sphenomorphus dussumieri — Taylor, 1953

= Sphenomorphus dussumieri =

Species of lizard

Sphenomorphus dussumieri, commonly known as Dussumier's forest skink and Dussumier's litter skink, is a species of skink, a lizard in the family Scincidae. The species is endemic to southern India.

== Geographic range ==
S. dussumieri is found in the Western Ghats of India, in the Indian states of Kerala and Tamil Nadu.

== Etymology ==
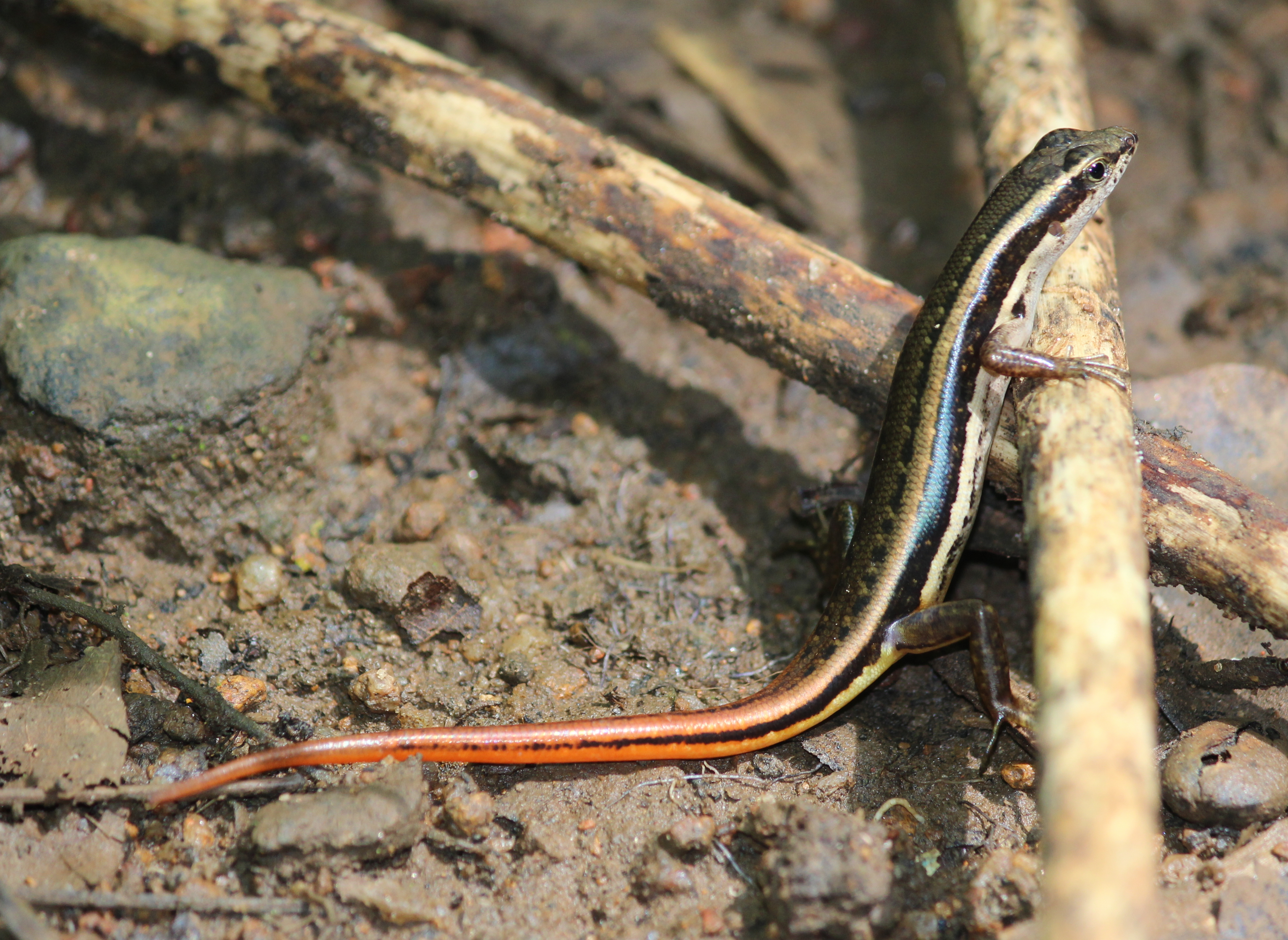
In Kanjirappally

The specific name, dussumieri, is in honor of Jean-Jacques Dussumier, a French voyager who collected zoological specimens in South Asia in the early 19th century. It is locally known as "അരണ (arana)".

== Description ==
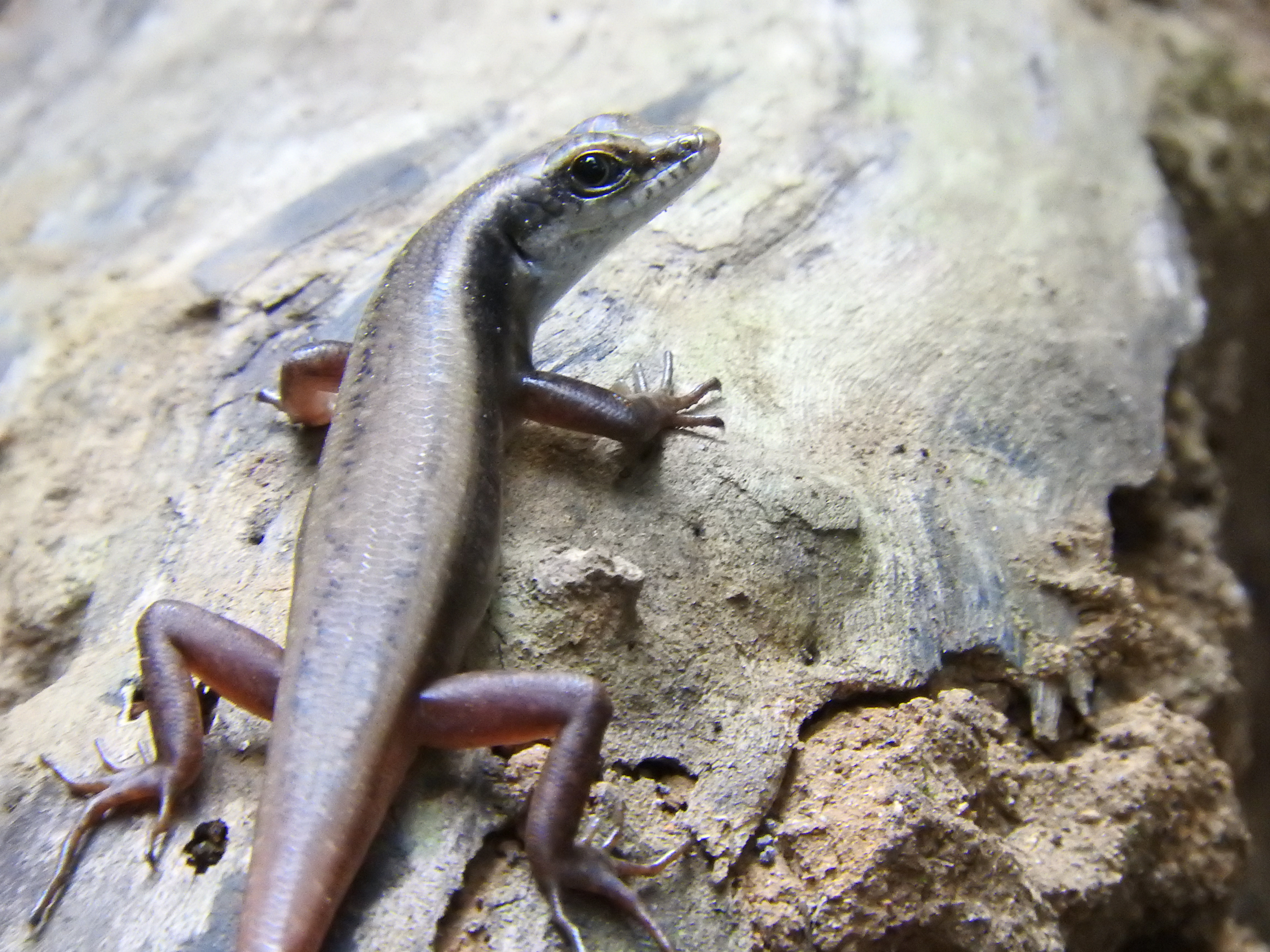
Dussumier's litter skink also known as Dussumier's forest skink

The head of S. dussumieri is distinct from the neck, and the snout is short. The tympanum is situated on the surface, not sunk as in other skinks. The body is slender. The dorsal scales are smooth, with fine striations. The limbs are relatively short. The dorsum is bronze brown, with dark spots. There is a light dorso-lateral stripe running from the eye to the side of the body, its inner edge with a dark brown, white spotted streak. There is also a broad stripe on the sides that is edged with white below. The venter is creamy.

== Ecology ==
S. dussumieri is a diurnal skink, which inhabits evergreen, moist deciduous, and plantation forests, such as rubber plantations, in closed as well as open forests, at altitudes of 15–500 m (49–1,640 ft).
