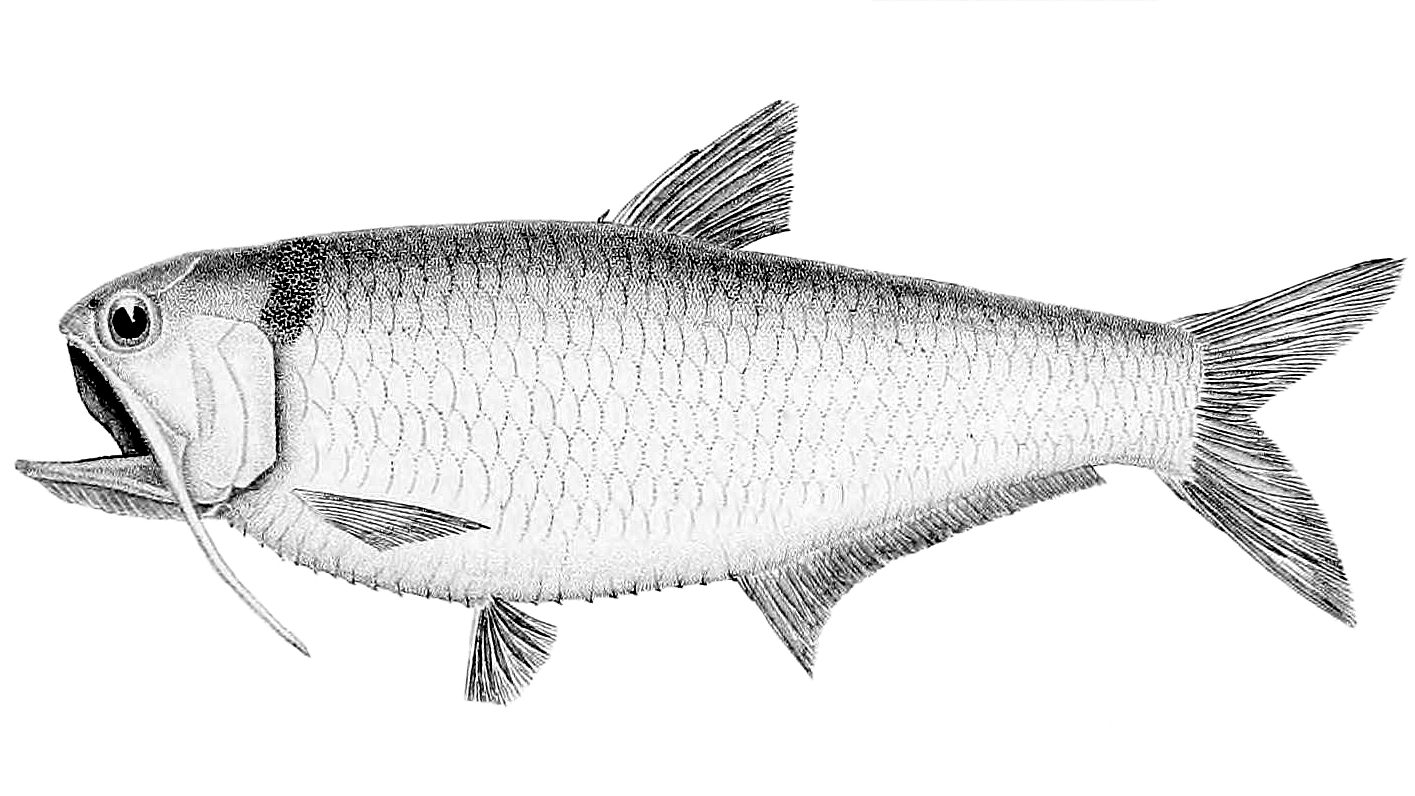

Conservation status
- Least Concern (IUCN 3.1)

Scientific classification
- Kingdom: Animalia
- Phylum: Chordata
- Class: Actinopterygii
- Order: Clupeiformes
- Family: Engraulidae
- Genus: Thryssa
- Species: T. dussumieri

Binomial name
- Thryssa dussumieri (Valenciennes, 1848)

Synonyms
- List: Engraulis dussumieri Valenciennes, 1848; Scutengraulis dussumieri (Valenciennes, 1848); Thrissa dussumieri (Valenciennes, 1848); Thrissocles dussumieri (Valenciennes, 1848)

= Thryssa dussumieri =

Dussumier's thryssa

Species of fish

Thryssa dussumieri, the Dussumier's thryssa, is a species of ray-finned fish in the family Engraulidae. It is found in the Indo-Pacific.

== Size ==
This species reaches a length of 11 cm (4.3 in).

== Etymology ==
The fish is named in honor of Jean-Jacques Dussumier (1792–1883), a French voyager and merchant, who collected the holotype specimen.
