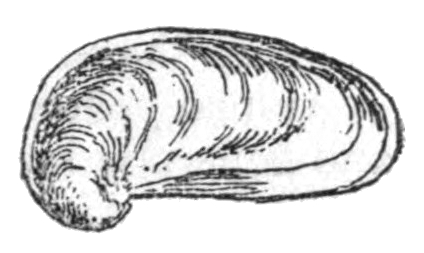
- Drawing of the internal shell of Mariaella dussumieri.

Scientific classification
- Domain: Eukaryota
- Kingdom: Animalia
- Phylum: Mollusca
- Class: Gastropoda
- Order: Stylommatophora
- Family: Ariophantidae
- Genus: Mariaella
- Species: M. dussumieri

Binomial name
- Mariaella dussumieri Gray, 1855

= Mariaella dussumieri =

Species of gastropod

Mariaella dussumieri is a species of air-breathing land slug, a terrestrial pulmonate gastropod mollusk in the family Ariophantidae.

Mariaella dussumieri is the type species of the genus Mariaella.

Its specific name is in honor of French merchant Jean-Jacques Dussumier.

== Distribution ==
This species lives in India. It is endemic to Western Ghats. In the Western Ghats it occurs as far north as the Kadur district of Mysore and perhaps to Mahableshwar. Hill-tracts of Ceylon. The type locality was Mahé, India, a small town between Calicut and Cannanore on the Malabar coast.

This species has not yet become established in the USA, but it is considered to represent a potentially serious threat as a pest, an invasive species which could negatively affect agriculture, natural ecosystems, human health or commerce. Therefore, it has been suggested that this species be given top national quarantine significance in the USA.

== Shell description ==
The internal shell in general thin, slightly convex, ovate and white. The apex of the shell is forming a small point at the right side and near the posterior end. The shell is not involute.

== Anatomy ==
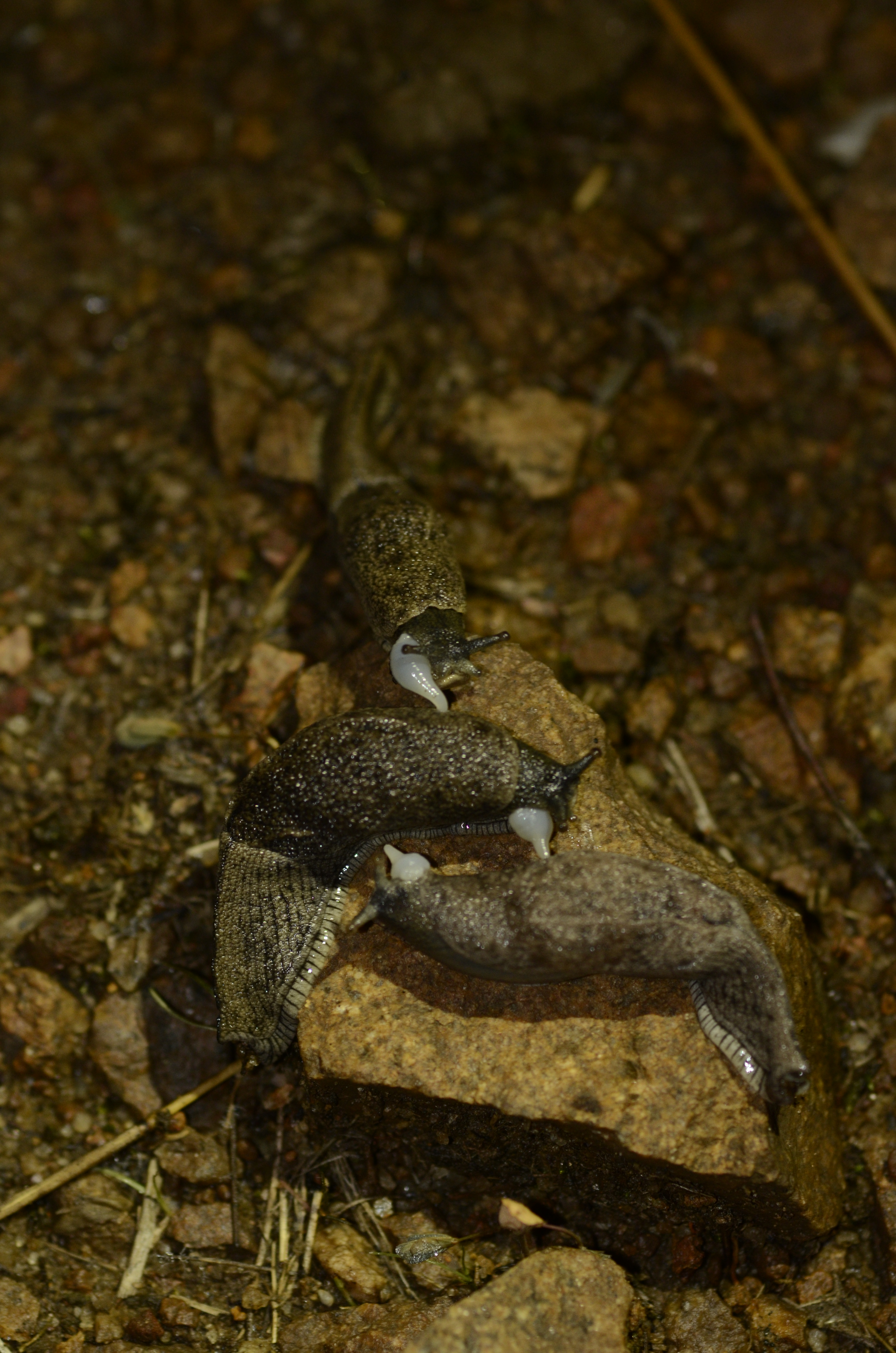
Mariaella dussumieri mating in Southern Western Ghats

The color of the animal is yellowish brown or olivaceous, sometimes almost black, and generally mottled with dark blotches. The mantle has two narrow raised ridges on the shell-lobes, one running from the little shell-aperture round the left margin of the shell, the other towards the respiratory orifice on the right margin. The size appears to vary up to about 8 inches (200 mm) in length. Teeth of radula in one specimen were 88.3.20.1.20.3.88 (111.1.111), in another 95.2.18.1.18.2.95 (115.1.115).

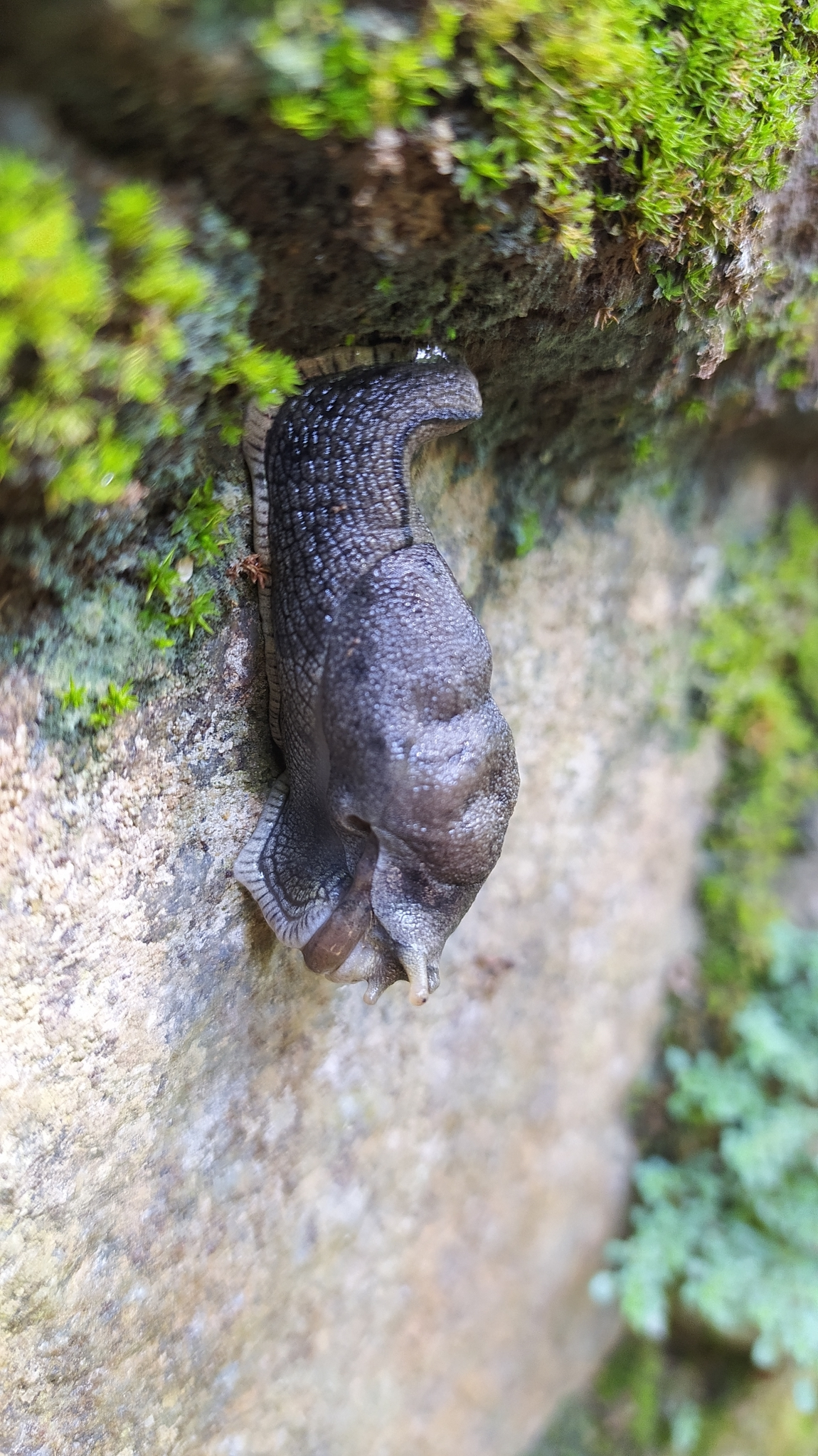
Mariaella dussumieri, from horticulture garden in Kallar, Ooty.
