= Southern plains gray langur =

Former species of primate

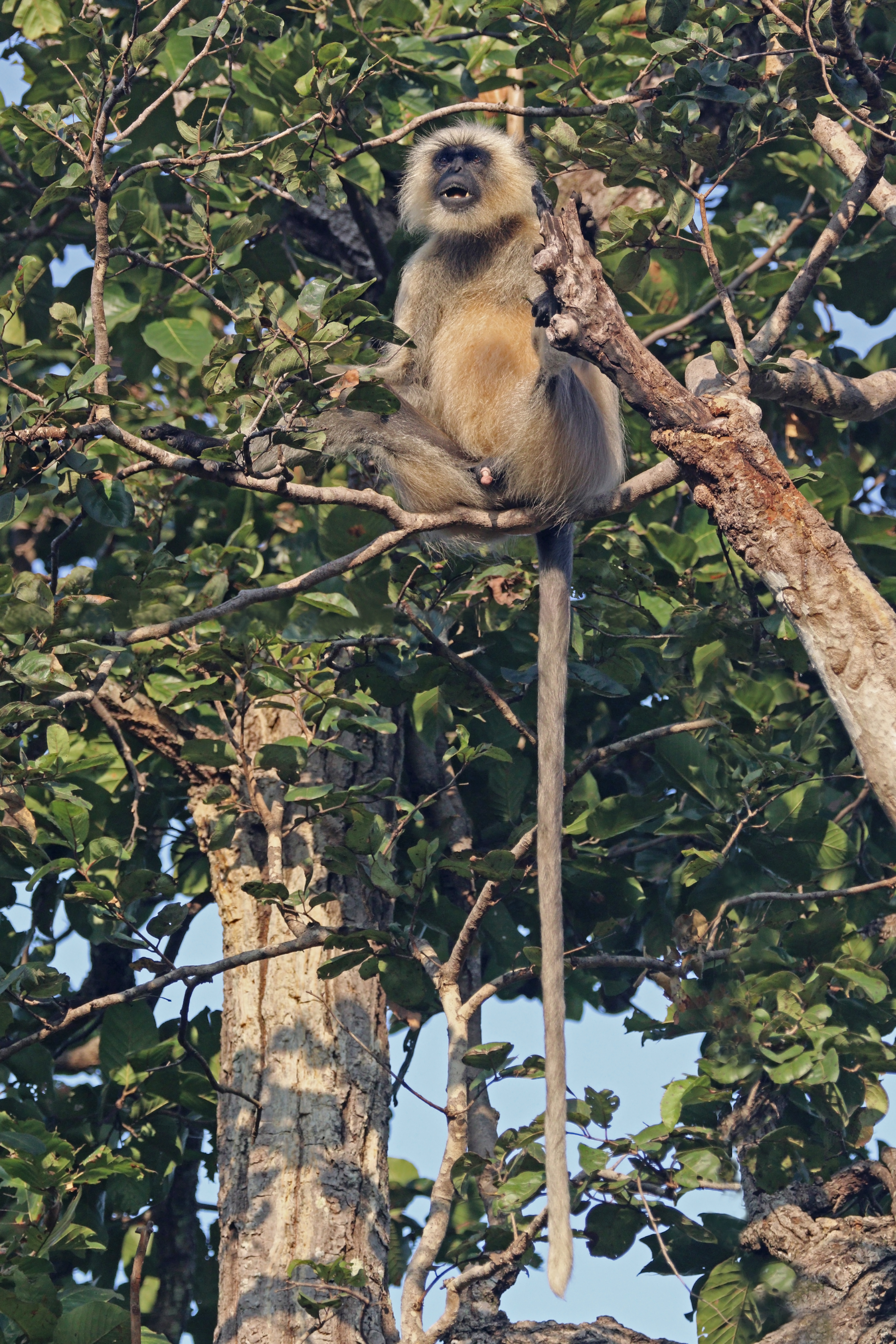
Male, Kanha National Park, India

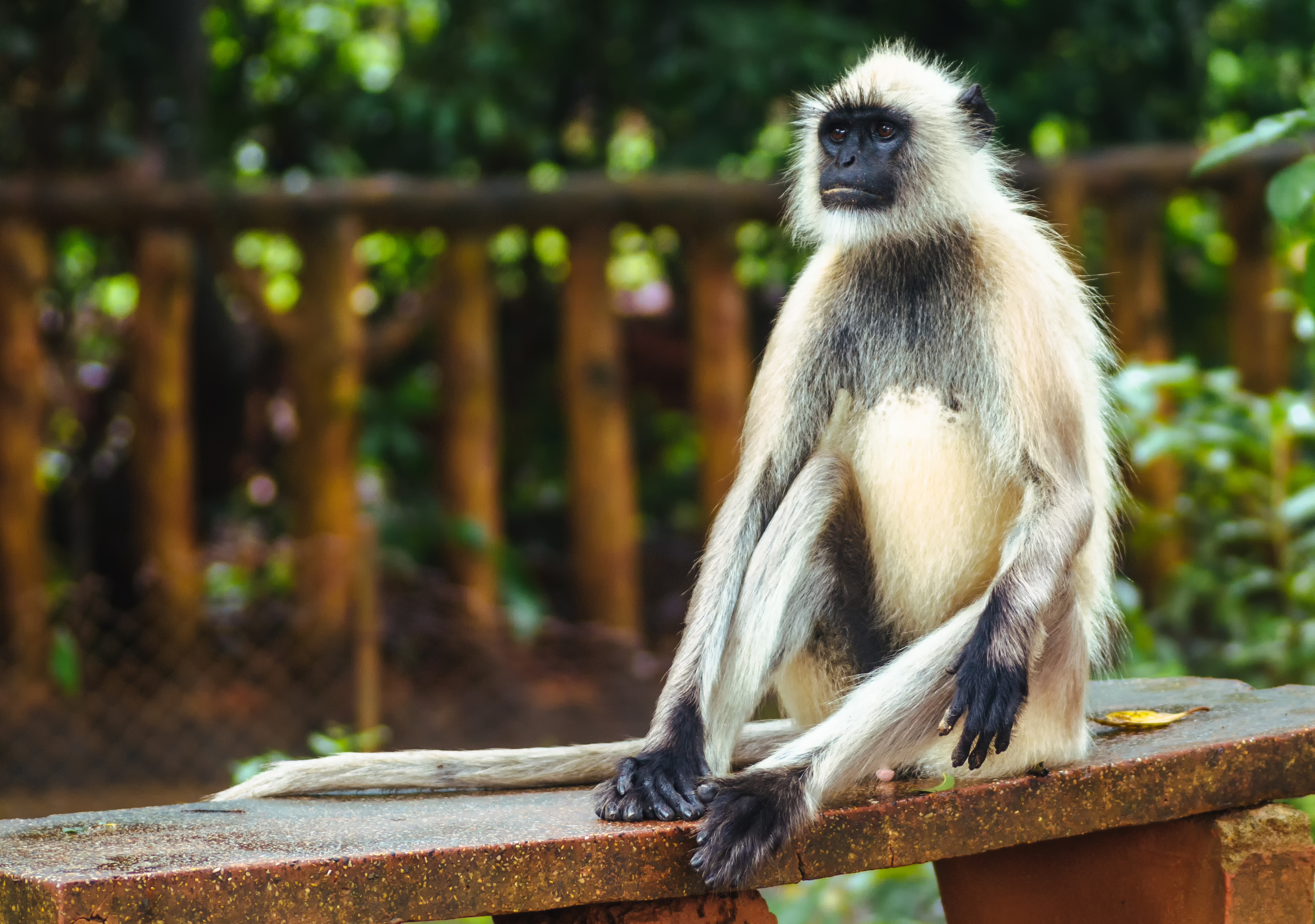
Semnopithecus dussumieri (southern plains grey langur) sitting on a park bench in Nandankanan Zoological Park, Bhubaneshwar

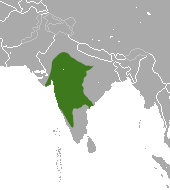
Range that had been attributed to the southern plains gray langur

Southern plains gray langur was the common name ascribed to Semnopithecus dussumieri by Mammal Species of the World (3rd edition) in 2005. Along with several other Semnopithecus, it had been previously considered a subspecies of the northern plains gray langur, Semnopithecus entellus, i.e., Semnopithecus entellus dussumieri. Subsequent genetic research has revealed that Semnopithecus dussumieri is an invalid taxon. These monkeys live in groups in forests and other rural habitats, with some groups being habituated to human contact and feeding. They are herbivorous, feeding by day mainly on foliage, fruits and flowers, and sleeping at night high in a tree.

== Taxonomy ==
The taxonomy of gray langurs has been in a state of flux. At first, all gray langurs were included in a single species, Semnopithecus entellus, with several subspecies, but more recently some authorities have elevated these to species status. The southern plains gray langur was the common name ascribed to Semnopithecus dussumieri by Mammal Species of the World (3rd edition) in 2005. Along with several other Semnopithecus, it had been previously considered a subspecies of the northern plains gray langur, Semnopithecus entellus, i.e., Semnopithecus entellus dussumieri. Subsequent genetic research has revealed that Semnopithecus dussumieri is an invalid taxon. As a result, most populations of gray langurs that had been considered to be southern plains gray langur are considered to be populations of northern plains gray langurs S. entellus.

== Description ==
The populations formerly regarded as southern plains gray langur are among the smaller gray langurs, with a height of about 62 cm (24 in), a tail longer than the body and a weight of about 12 kg (26 lb). The hair on the top of their heads are cream-coloured, the body fur is grayish-brown or purplish-brown and the underparts are yellowish. The face and ears are black as are the hands and feet, and sometimes the ends of the limbs. When they move around, they carry their tails pointing backwards.

== Distribution and habitat ==
The populations that had been considered to be southern plains gray langur are native to western, central and south-western India. They are found in various forest habitats, both humid and dry, and in dry scrubby locations, and have adapted to live close to humans, visiting agricultural areas, orchards, grassland and villages.

== Ecology ==
The diet mainly consists of leaves, fruits and flowers, supplemented by insects, gum and soil. The food is mostly gathered from trees and shrubs, but grasses and small herbs are also eaten. A range of other foods are also eaten such as cultivated plants, tubers and roots. The monkeys are often fed by humans and accept cakes, millet, and other foods. The diet varies according to the time of year and food availability. In some areas, cattle and deer will stand under trees where the langurs are feeding and consume the edible pieces that they drop. The monkeys are preyed on by leopards, tigers and dholes, and they sometimes mob snakes.

Groups may consist of a mature male with several females and their offspring of different ages; or they may be larger mixed-sex groups, or groups of different sizes formed entirely of males. Females often remain permanently in their natal group while males change groups more often. The dominant male in a mixed-sex group fathers all or most of the young. The incidence of infanticide is high and dominant females are more likely to raise their young successfully. The gestation period is about two hundred days and weaning takes place at about thirteen months. Females are sociable towards each other and much infant care is provided by females other than the mother. The southern plains gray langur can live for about thirty years.

== Status ==
The populations that had been regarded as southern plains gray langur have a very wide range and are common. It faces no particular threats and when it was considered a species the International Union for Conservation of Nature assessed its conservation status as being of least concern. It is illegal to kill or capture these monkeys, but the law is not well known or well enforced, and many are used for public entertainment or kept as pets. They are considered sacred and some are used by Hindu priests for religious purposes. They have adapted to living in close proximity to humans in urban settings and occasionally get killed on the road. In rural areas, they may be persecuted by farmers when they raid crops. They are also sometimes hunted for food, and certain parts of their body are used for lucky charms.
