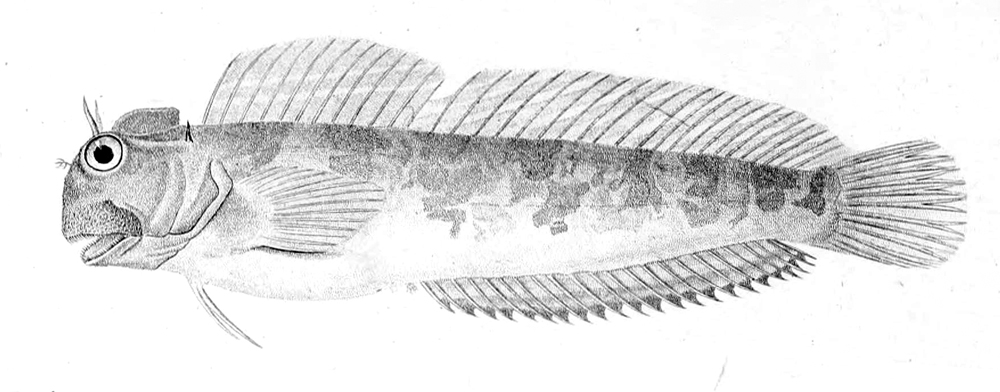

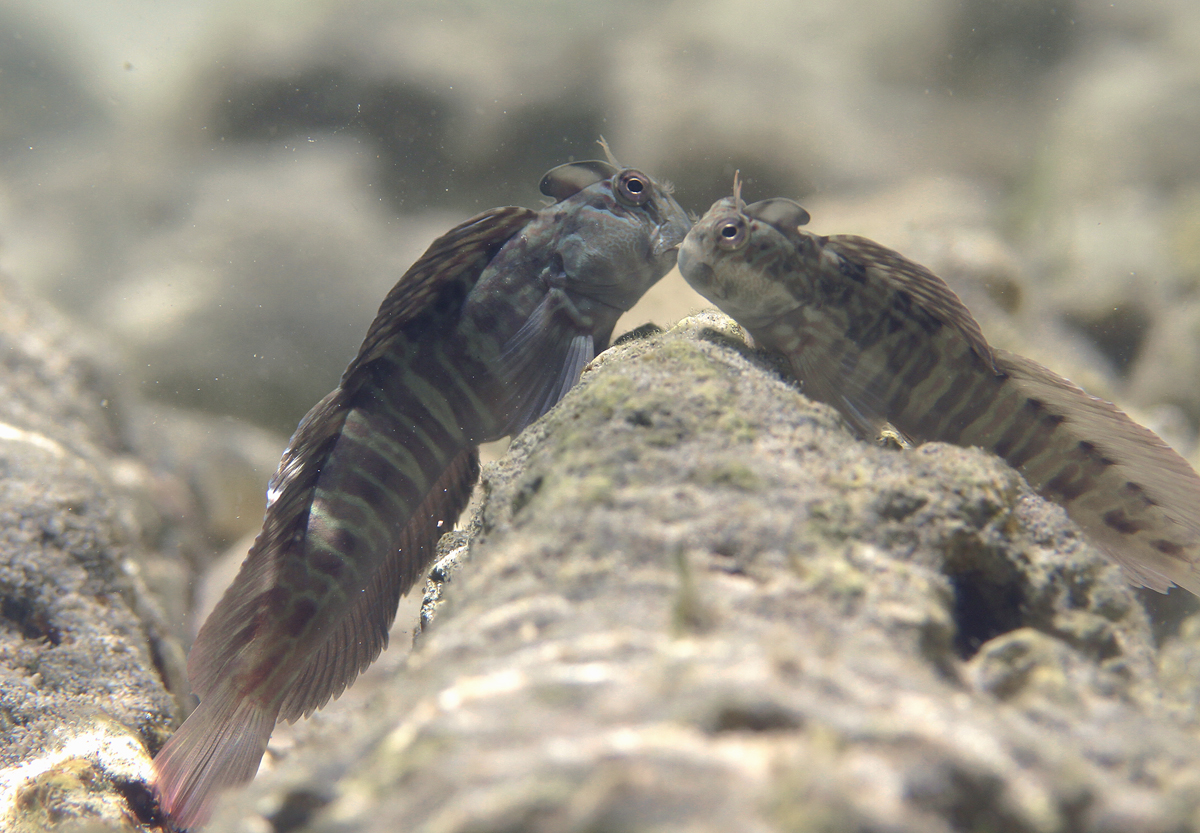

Conservation status
- Least Concern (IUCN 3.1)

Scientific classification
- Kingdom: Animalia
- Phylum: Chordata
- Class: Actinopterygii
- Division: Teleostei
- Order: Blenniiformes
- Family: Blenniidae
- Genus: Istiblennius
- Species: I. edentulus

Binomial name
- Istiblennius edentulus (J. R. Forster & J. G. Schneider, 1801)

Synonyms
- Blennius edentulus Forster & Schneider, 1801; Alticops edentulus (Forster & Schneider, 1801); Blennius truncatus Forster, 1801; Salarias quadricornis Valenciennes, 1836; Salarias melanocephalus Bleeker, 1849; Salarias sumatranus Bleeker, 1851; Salarias diproktopterus Bleeker, 1857; Blennius cinereus Castelnau, 1875; Salarias atratus Macleay, 1882; Salarias insulae Ogilby, 1899; Scartichthys enosimae Jordan & Snyder, 1902; Istiblennius enosimae (Jordan & Snyder, 1902); Scartella enosimae (Jordan & Snyder, 1902); Salarias gilberti Bryan & Herre, 1903; Salarias marcusi Bryan & Herre, 1903; Scartichthys basiliscus Fowler, 1904; Salarias garmani Jordan & Seale, 1906; Salarias sindonis Jordan & Seale, 1906; Salarias azureus Seale, 1906; Salarias rechingeri Steindachner, 1906; Salarias fluctatus Fowler, 1945; Salarias atrimarginatus Fowler, 1946

= Istiblennius edentulus =

Species of fish

Istiblennius edentulus, the rippled rockskipper, is a species of combtooth blenny found in coral reefs in the Pacific and Indian Oceans. It is also commonly known as the rippled blenny, smooth-lipped blenny, toothless blenny, or coral blenny. Males of this species can reach a maximum of 16 cm (6.3 in) TL, while females can reach a maximum of 13.2 cm (5.2 in) SL.
