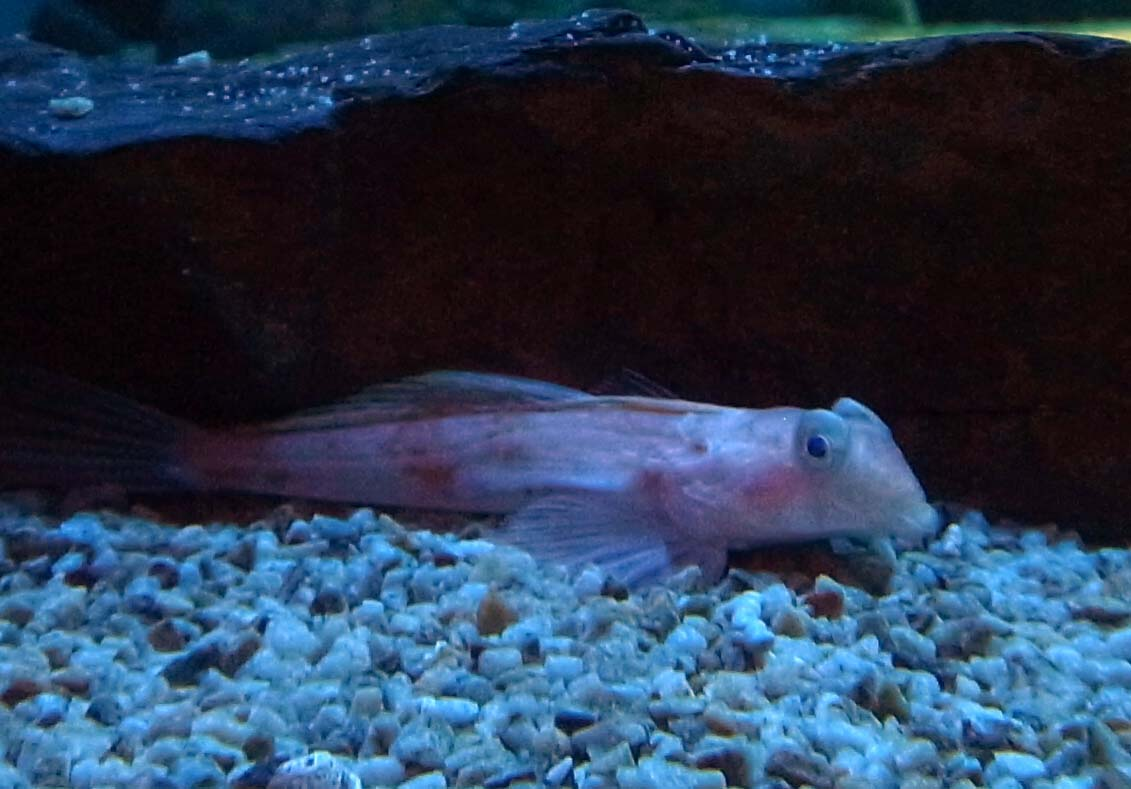

Scientific classification
- Kingdom: Animalia
- Phylum: Chordata
- Class: Actinopterygii
- Division: Teleostei
- Order: Syngnathiformes
- Family: Callionymidae
- Genus: Foetorepus
- Species: F. altivelis

Binomial name
- Foetorepus altivelis (Temminck & Schlegel, 1845)

Synonyms
- Callionymus altivelis Temminck & Schlegel, 1845; Synchiropus altivelis Temminck & Schlegel, 1845

= Red dragonet =

Species of fish

The red dragonet (Foetorepus altivelis) is a species of dragonet native to the Indian Ocean and the western Pacific Ocean where it occurs at depths of from 70 to 600 metres (230 to 1,970 ft). Males of this species reaches a length of 17 centimetres (6.7 in) SL while females only reach 13 centimetres (5.1 in) SL. This species is of commercial importance to local fisheries.
