= Synchiropus grandoculis =

Conservation status
- Least Concern (IUCN 3.1)

Scientific classification
- Kingdom: Animalia
- Phylum: Chordata
- Class: Actinopterygii
- Order: Syngnathiformes
- Family: Callionymidae
- Genus: Synchiropus
- Species: S. grandoculis

Binomial name
- Synchiropus grandoculis R. Fricke, 2000

Species of fish

Synchiropus grandoculis, the Western Australian bigeye dragonet, is a species of fish in the dragonet family Callionymidae. It is found in the eastern Indian Ocean along the coast of Western Australia.

== Etymology ==
The name of the fish comes from grandis meaning large, and oculus, meaning eye, referring to its "unusually large" eyes.
