= Synchiropus novaehiberniensis =

Scientific classification
- Domain: Eukaryota
- Kingdom: Animalia
- Phylum: Chordata
- Class: Actinopterygii
- Order: Callionymiformes
- Family: Callionymidae
- Genus: Synchiropus
- Species: S. novaehiberniensis

Binomial name
- Synchiropus novaehiberniensis R. Fricke, 2016

Species of fish

Synchiropus novaehiberniensis, the New Ireland dragonet, is a species of fish in the family Callionymidae, the dragonets. It is found in the western Pacific Ocean.

== Etymology ==
The fish is named after the island the fish was found at.
