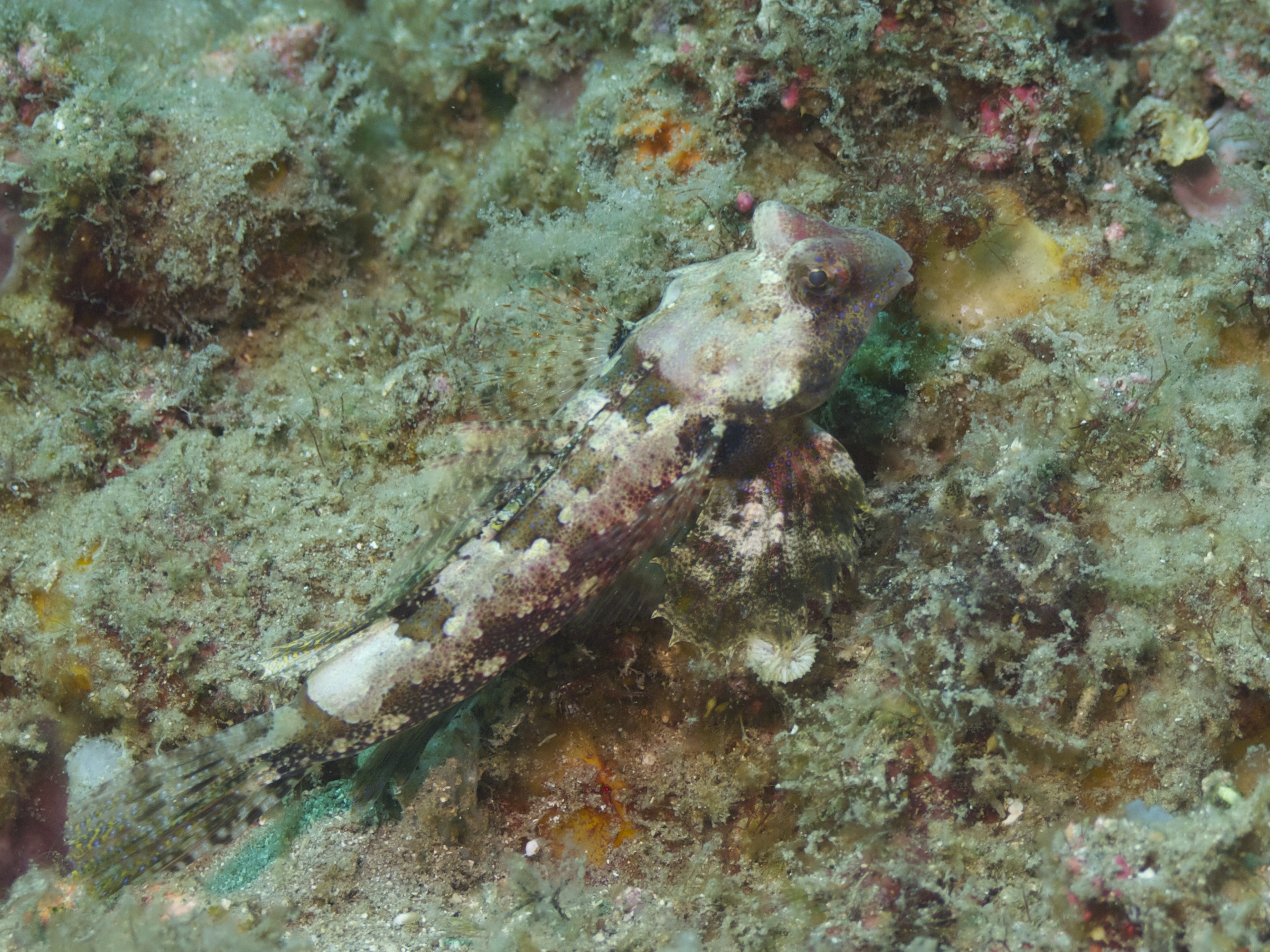

Scientific classification
- Domain: Eukaryota
- Kingdom: Animalia
- Phylum: Chordata
- Class: Actinopterygii
- Order: Callionymiformes
- Family: Callionymidae
- Genus: Synchiropus
- Species: S. morrisoni

Binomial name
- Synchiropus morrisoni L. P. Schultz, 1960

Synonyms
- Neosynchiropus morrisoni (Schultz, 1960)

= Morrison's dragonet =

Species of fish

Morrison's dragonet (Synchiropus morrisoni) is a species of dragonet. It is native to the southwest Pacific Ocean from Japan to Australia ant eastwards to the Marshall Islands and Fiji.

== Etymology ==
The specific name honours J.P.E. Morrison (1906-1983), the U.S. malacologist who was curator of molluscs at United States National Museum and who spent the summers of 1947 and 1948 at Bikini Atoll.

== Description ==
Morrison's dragonet is a small fish, with a maximum recorded size of about 7 cm (2.8 in). Soft dorsal rays branched. In males the first dorsal fin is much taller than the second, and in females it is shorter. Colour is a mottled red with variably sizes white spots and a dark brown blotch covering at least half of the base of the pectoral. In males, the first dorsal fin has narrow bars edged with light blue, and the lower head and front of the body has blue dots.

== Distribution ==
Japan to Australia and eastwards to the Marshall Islands and Fiji.

== Habitat ==
This species occurs on the algal covered rocks of the seaward sides of reefs; it is infrequent at depths shallower than 25 metres (82 ft) in most coral reef areas.
