= Synchiropus lateralis =

Scientific classification
- Kingdom: Animalia
- Phylum: Chordata
- Class: Actinopterygii
- Order: Syngnathiformes
- Family: Callionymidae
- Genus: Synchiropus
- Species: S. lateralis

Binomial name
- Synchiropus lateralis (J. Richardson, 1844)

Synonyms
- Callionymus lateralis J. Richardson, 1844; Callionymus lineolatus (non Valenciennes, 1837)

Species of fish

Synchiropus lateralis, the Chinese ornate dragonet, is a species of fish in the family Callionymidae, the dragonets. It is native to the South China Sea.
