= Foetorepus garthi =

Scientific classification
- Kingdom: Animalia
- Phylum: Chordata
- Class: Actinopterygii
- Order: Syngnathiformes
- Family: Callionymidae
- Genus: Foetorepus
- Species: F. garthi

Binomial name
- Foetorepus garthi (Seale, 1940)

Synonyms
- Callionymus garthi Seale, 1940

Species of fish

Foetorepus garthi is a species of ray-finned fish within the family Callionymidae. It is native to the southeast Pacific off Port Utria in Colombia, where it lives a demersal lifestyle in marine waters.
