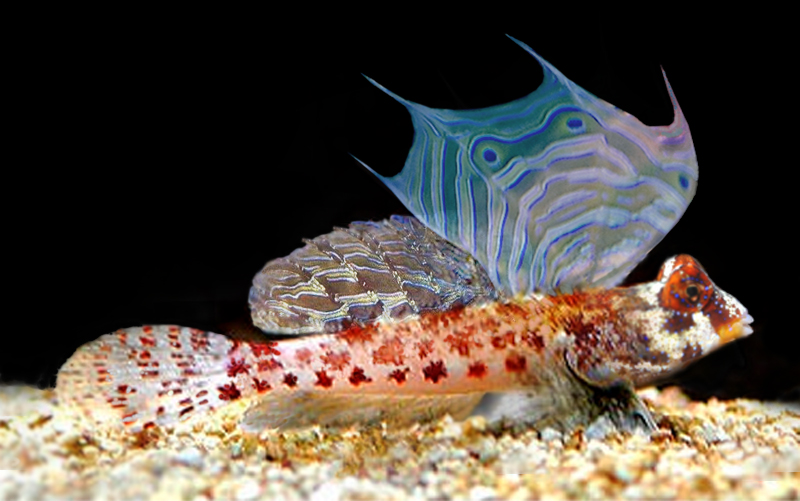

Scientific classification
- Domain: Eukaryota
- Kingdom: Animalia
- Phylum: Chordata
- Class: Actinopterygii
- Order: Callionymiformes
- Family: Callionymidae
- Genus: Synchiropus
- Species: S. stellatus

Binomial name
- Synchiropus stellatus J. L. B. Smith, 1963

Synonyms
- Neosynchiropus stellatus (J. L. B. Smith, 1963)

= Starry dragonet =

Species of fish

The starry dragonet (Synchiropus stellatus) is a species of dragonet native to the Indian Ocean where it is found at depths of around 40 metres (130 ft). It occasionally is found in the aquarium trade. It grows to a length of 7.5 centimetres (3.0 in) TL.
