= Synchiropus circularis =

Conservation status
- Least Concern (IUCN 3.1)

Scientific classification
- Kingdom: Animalia
- Phylum: Chordata
- Class: Actinopterygii
- Order: Syngnathiformes
- Family: Callionymidae
- Genus: Synchiropus
- Species: S. circularis

Binomial name
- Synchiropus circularis R. Fricke, 1984

Species of fish

Synchiropus circularis, the circled dragonet, is a species of fish in the dragonet family Callionymidae. It is found in the western Pacific Ocean.

== Description ==
This species reaches a length of 2.3 cm (0.91 in).

== Etymology ==
The fish is named after the body's circumferential white blotches.
