= Synchiropus monacanthus =

Scientific classification
- Kingdom: Animalia
- Phylum: Chordata
- Class: Actinopterygii
- Order: Syngnathiformes
- Family: Callionymidae
- Genus: Synchiropus
- Species: S. monacanthus

Binomial name
- Synchiropus monacanthus J. L. B. Smith, 1935

Species of fish

Synchiropus monacanthus, also commonly known as the deep-water dragonet or the South African bigeye dragonet, is a species of Syngnathiform fish that belongs to the dragonet family Callionymidae.

== Distribution ==
The range of Synchiropus monacanthus is known from scattered records and is poorly documented throughout much of its range. This species is distributed in both the western and eastern Indian Ocean and the south-eastern Atlantic Ocean. This range includes Tanzania, Zanzibar, Kenya, Madagascar, Mozambique, Port Alfred in South Africa and the Socotra Archipelago.

They can be found on muddy or soft bottoms in deep-water habitats at depths of 175 to 549 meters.

== Description ==
This species reaches a length of 13.0 cm (5.1 in). Their bodies are slender or elongated with a single yet prominent preopercular spine. They have a greenish and reddish brown to dark brown upper body with it being whitish from below. The species is known for its distinct fin morphology. They have elongated filaments on the first dorsal fin. Males have a higher first dorsal fin with different coloration than females. The caudal fin in adult males is likely longer but more pointed in females. The fins have violet streaks distally.
