= Synchiropus laddi =

Conservation status
- Least Concern (IUCN 3.1)

Scientific classification
- Kingdom: Animalia
- Phylum: Chordata
- Class: Actinopterygii
- Order: Syngnathiformes
- Family: Callionymidae
- Genus: Synchiropus
- Species: S. laddi

Binomial name
- Synchiropus laddi L. P. Schultz, 1960

Species of fish

Synchiropus laddi, also known as Ladd's dragonet, is a species of fish in the dragonet family Callionymidae. It is found in the Pacific Ocean.

== Description ==
This species reaches a length of 3.0 cm (1.2 in).

== Etymology ==
The fish is named in honor of geologist Harry Stephen Ladd (1899–1982), of the U.S. Geological Survey, who was at Bikini Atoll, Marshall Islands (type locality), during Operations Crossroads (1946 and again in 1947), studying the effects of the atomic bombs,
