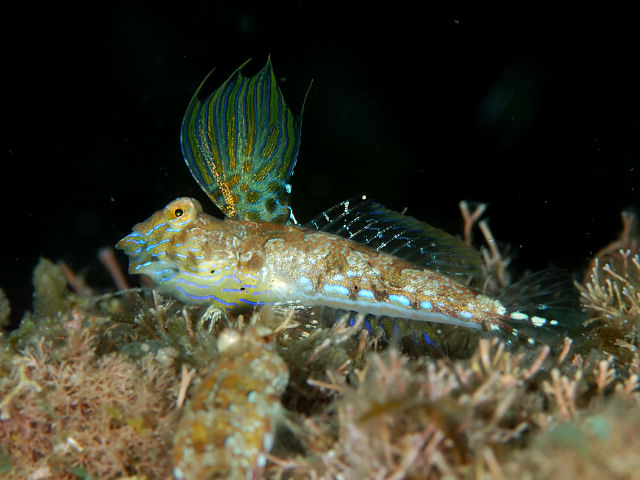

Scientific classification
- Domain: Eukaryota
- Kingdom: Animalia
- Phylum: Chordata
- Class: Actinopterygii
- Order: Callionymiformes
- Family: Callionymidae
- Genus: Synchiropus
- Species: S. kiyoae

Binomial name
- Synchiropus kiyoae R. Fricke & Zaiser, 1983

Synonyms
- Minysynchiropus kiyoae (Fricke & Zaiser, 1983)

= Synchiropus kiyoae =

Species of fish

Synchiropus kiyoae, Kiyo's dragonet, is a species of dragonet native to the Pacific Ocean where it occurs around Japan and has been seen around Hawaii. This species can be found on coarse substrates at depths of from 5 to 14 metres (16 to 46 ft). This species grows to a length of 2 centimetres (0.79 in) SL.

== Etymology ==
The specific name honours Mrs.Kiyoe Tanaka, the widow of Tatsuo Tanaka, who donated land, facilities, and her personal time for to help establish the Tatsuo Tanaka Memorial Biological Station on Miyake-jima, Japan. It is considered by some authorities to be the only species in the monospecific genus Minysynchiropus but most authorities place it within the genus Synchiropus.
