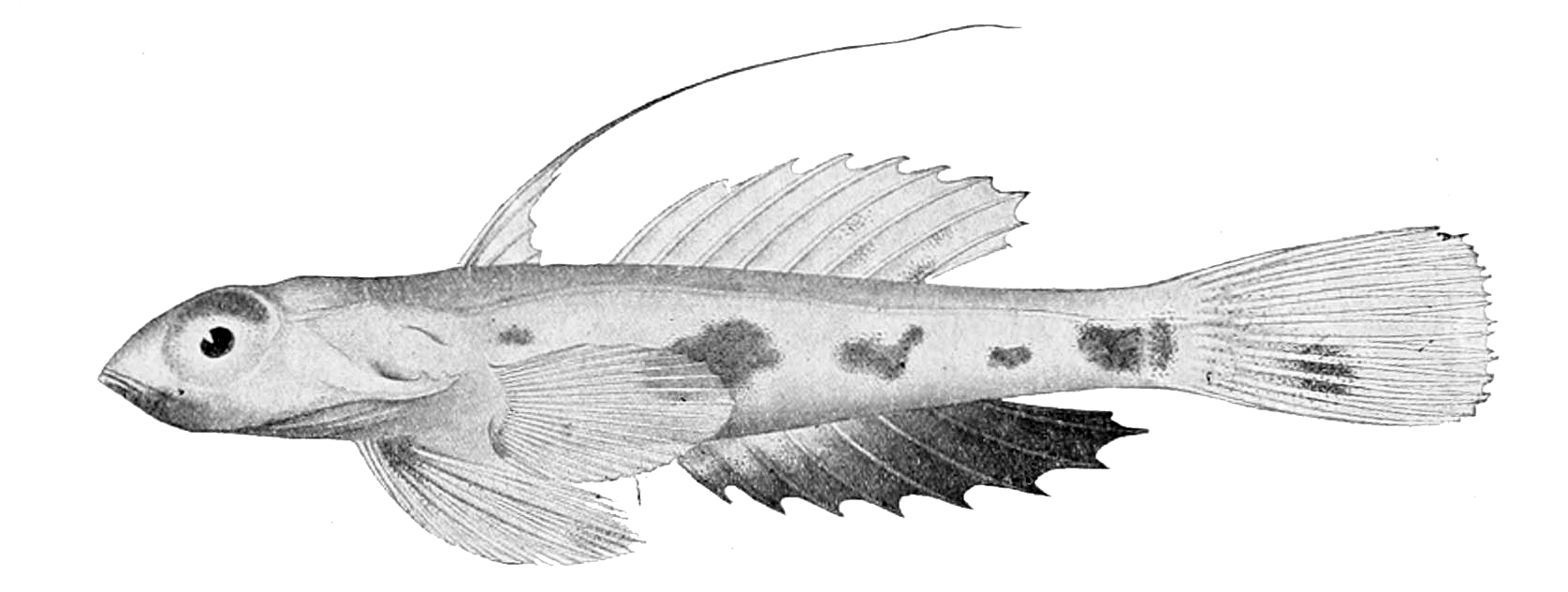

Scientific classification
- Domain: Eukaryota
- Kingdom: Animalia
- Phylum: Chordata
- Class: Actinopterygii
- Order: Callionymiformes
- Family: Callionymidae
- Genus: Synchiropus
- Species: S. rubrovinctus

Binomial name
- Synchiropus rubrovinctus (C. H. Gilbert, 1905)

Synonyms
- Callionymus rubrovinctus Gilbert, 1905; Neosynchiropus rubrovinctus (Gilbert, 1905)

= Synchiropus rubrovinctus =

Species of fish

Synchiropus rubrovinctus, the tiny Hawaiian dragonet, is a species of dragonet native to the western Pacific where it has been found around Japan, New Caledonia and Hawaii. This species occurs at depths of from 1 to 79 metres (3.3 to 259.2 ft). This species reaches a length of 2.4 centimetres (0.94 in) TL.
