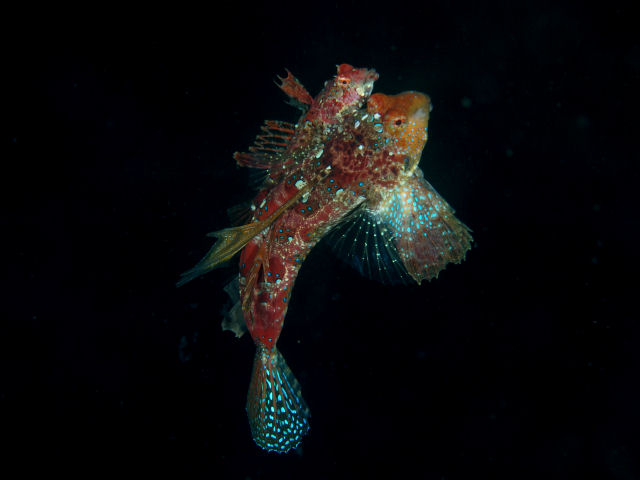

Scientific classification
- Kingdom: Animalia
- Phylum: Chordata
- Class: Actinopterygii
- Division: Teleostei
- Order: Syngnathiformes
- Family: Callionymidae
- Genus: Neosynchiropus; Nalbant, 1979

Type species
- Neosynchiropus bacescui Nalbant, 1979

= Neosynchiropus =

Genus of fishes

Neosynchiropus is a small genus of Indo-Pacific dragonets. This genus is considered by some authorities to be a synonym of Synchiropus.

== Species ==
There are three species classified as being members of the genus Neosynchiropus:

- Neosynchiropus bacescui Nalbant, 1979
- Neosynchiropus ijimae (Jordan & Thompson, 1914) (Japanese dragonet)
- Neosynchiropus ocellatus (Pallas, 1770) (Ocellated dragonet)
