= Synchiropus signipinnis =

Scientific classification
- Kingdom: Animalia
- Phylum: Chordata
- Class: Actinopterygii
- Order: Syngnathiformes
- Family: Callionymidae
- Genus: Synchiropus
- Species: S. signipinnis

Binomial name
- Synchiropus signipinnis R. Fricke, 2000

Species of fish

Synchiropus signipinnis, the Chesterfield bigeye dragonet, is a species of fish in the family Callionymidae, the dragonets. It is found in the western-central Pacific Ocean.

== Etymology ==
The fish's name is from signum, meaning "banner", and pinnis, meaning "fin", referring to the high first-dorsal fin of the male.
