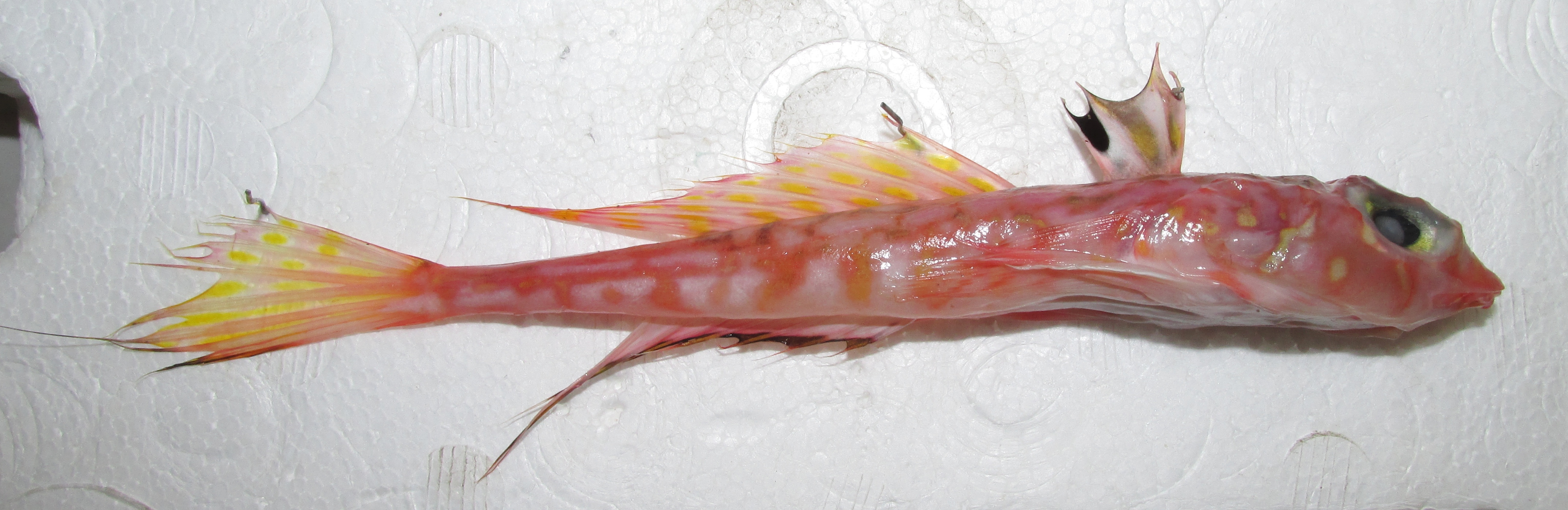

Conservation status
- Least Concern (IUCN 3.1)

Scientific classification
- Kingdom: Animalia
- Phylum: Chordata
- Class: Actinopterygii
- Order: Syngnathiformes
- Family: Callionymidae
- Genus: Synchiropus
- Species: S. phaeton

Binomial name
- Synchiropus phaeton (Günther, 1861)
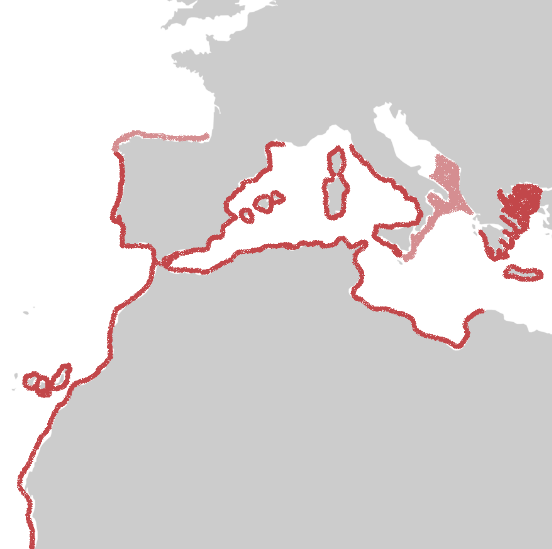
- Dristribution range in Mediterranean

= Synchiropus phaeton =

Species of fish

Synchiropus phaeton (from the Greek symphysis, "grown together", cheir "hand" and pous, "foot") or the Phaeton dragonet is a species of bony fish of the family Callionymidae, the dragonets (Günther, 1861). It can be found in the Mediterranean and in the eastern Atlantic.

== Description ==
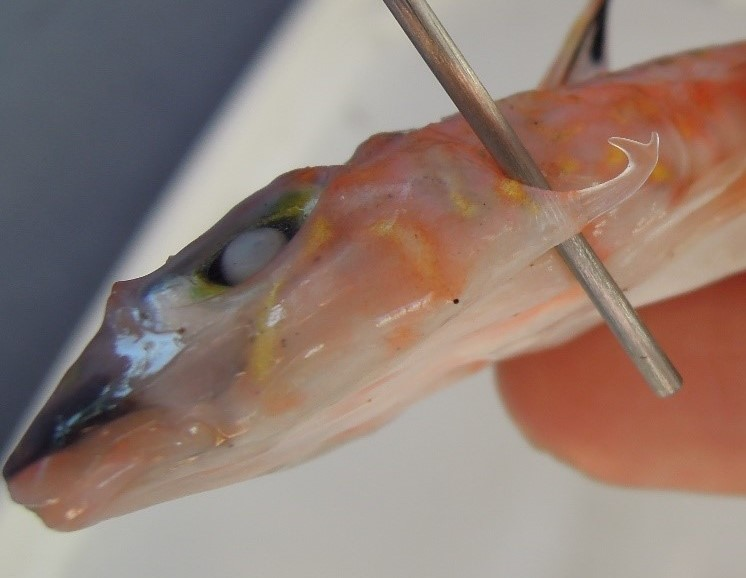
Preopercular spine of Synchiropus phaeton.

Synchiropus phaeton is a relatively small animal with a sexual dimorphism in size where the male fish generally are larger than the female fish. Male fish grow up to 10–14 cm with a maximum total length of 18 cm reported. Female fish can grow up to 12 cm with 6–10 cm being common although sizes greater 20 cm are reported. They are characterized by their big eyes which are sitting inside the skull and an extraordinary spiny structure on the top of their gill cover (preopercular spine). Their body has an orange or red colour dorsally with yellow to olive patches on their skin. The belly colour can vary from pinkish to silvery. The dorsal fin has a black blotch between the third and fourth spine, whereas the anal fin has a black streak or margin.

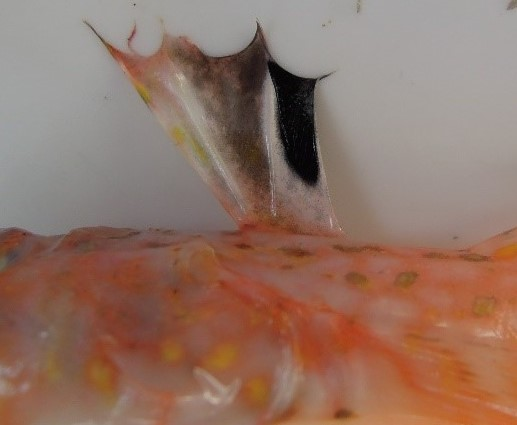
Dorsal fin of the Phaeton dragonet with the typical black blotch.

== Distribution ==
The Phaeton dragonet can be found in the eastern Atlantic Ocean along the coast of Portugal and from the Azores to Gabon. It also occurs in the Mediterranean Sea all the way to Cyprus where it is commonly found and up to the coast of Israel. It is not as abundant in the northern Adriatic Sea and northern Aegean Sea.

== Biology ==
Synchiropus phaeton is a benthic deep-water species found in depths of 80–650 m. Its habitat consists of muddy and sandy bottoms where it feeds on small bottom invertebrates like worms, snails and crustaceans. Male fish have a territorial behaviour, meaning they are aggressive towards other male fish of the same species.

Reproduction in the Mediterranean Phaeton dragonet occurs from June to September. Its eggs and larvae develop floating in the open water and therefore are pelagic.

== Threats ==
Synchiropus phaeton occurs as a bycatch in octopus fishery in Senegal and bottom trawl fishery in the mediterranean. Some fish of the Callionymidae family are marketed locally and utilized in aquarium trade.

There are no known major threats to the Phaeton dragonet. The population is thought to be highly abundant and the species is not listed as endangered and therefore marked as LC for "least concern".
