= Synchiropus springeri =

Scientific classification
- Domain: Eukaryota
- Kingdom: Animalia
- Phylum: Chordata
- Class: Actinopterygii
- Order: Callionymiformes
- Family: Callionymidae
- Genus: Synchiropus
- Species: S. springeri

Binomial name
- Synchiropus springeri R. Fricke, 1983

Species of fish

Synchiropus springeri, also known as Springer's dragonet, is a species of fish in the dragonet family Callionymidae. It is found in the western Pacific Ocean.

== Description ==
This species grows up to 1.8 cm (0.71 in) in length.

== Etymology ==
The fish is named in honor of ichthyologist Victor G. Springer of the U.S. National Museum, who was the one who collected the type specimens during his Fiji Islands Expedition in 1982 and loaned the specimens and many other specimens to Fricke for examination.
