= Synchiropus orstom =

Scientific classification
- Domain: Eukaryota
- Kingdom: Animalia
- Phylum: Chordata
- Class: Actinopterygii
- Order: Callionymiformes
- Family: Callionymidae
- Genus: Synchiropus
- Species: S. orstom

Binomial name
- Synchiropus orstom R. Fricke, 2000

Species of fish

Synchiropus orstom, the Orstom dragonet, is a species of fish in the family Callionymidae, the dragonets. It is found in the western-central Pacific Ocean.

== Etymology ==
The fish is named after ORSTOM (Office de la Recherche Scientifique et Technique Outre-Mer, now named I.R.D., Institut de Recherche pour le Développement).
