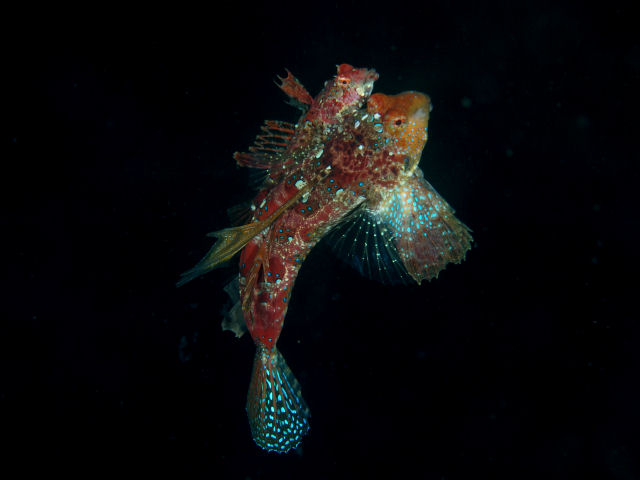

Scientific classification
- Kingdom: Animalia
- Phylum: Chordata
- Class: Actinopterygii
- Order: Syngnathiformes
- Family: Callionymidae
- Genus: Neosynchiropus
- Species: N. ijimae

Binomial name
- Neosynchiropus ijimae Jordan & Thompson, 1914

Synonyms
- Synchiropus ijimai Jordan & Thompson, 1914; Synchiropus izimae Jordan & Thompson, 1914; Synchiropus izimai Jordan & Thompson, 1914

= Japanese dragonet =

Species of fish

The Japanese dragonet (Neosynchiropus ijimae) is a species of dragonet native to the northwestern Pacific Ocean, where it is known from the waters off of Japan and South Korea. It can be found on coral or rocky reefs at depths of 10 to 20 metres (33 to 66 ft), in preferred water temperatures of 18 to 22 °C (64 to 72 °F). It is also found in the aquarium trade. This species reaches a length of 7 centimetres (2.8 in) SL and 10 centimetres (3.9 in) TL.
