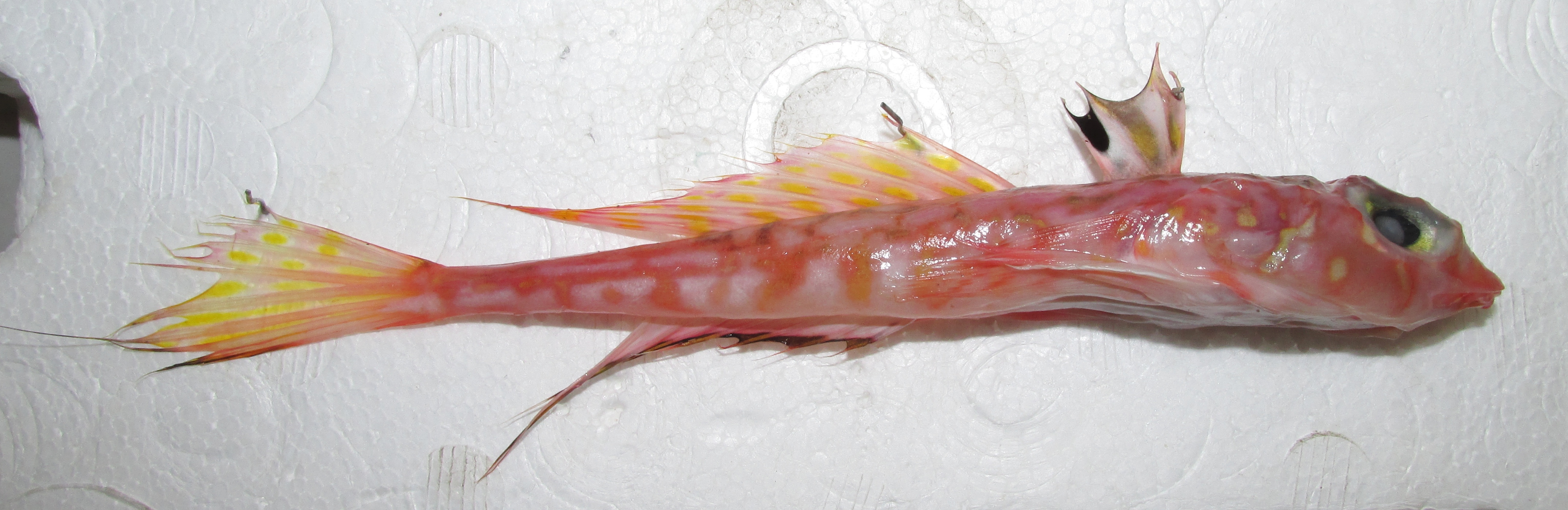
- Synchiropus phaeton
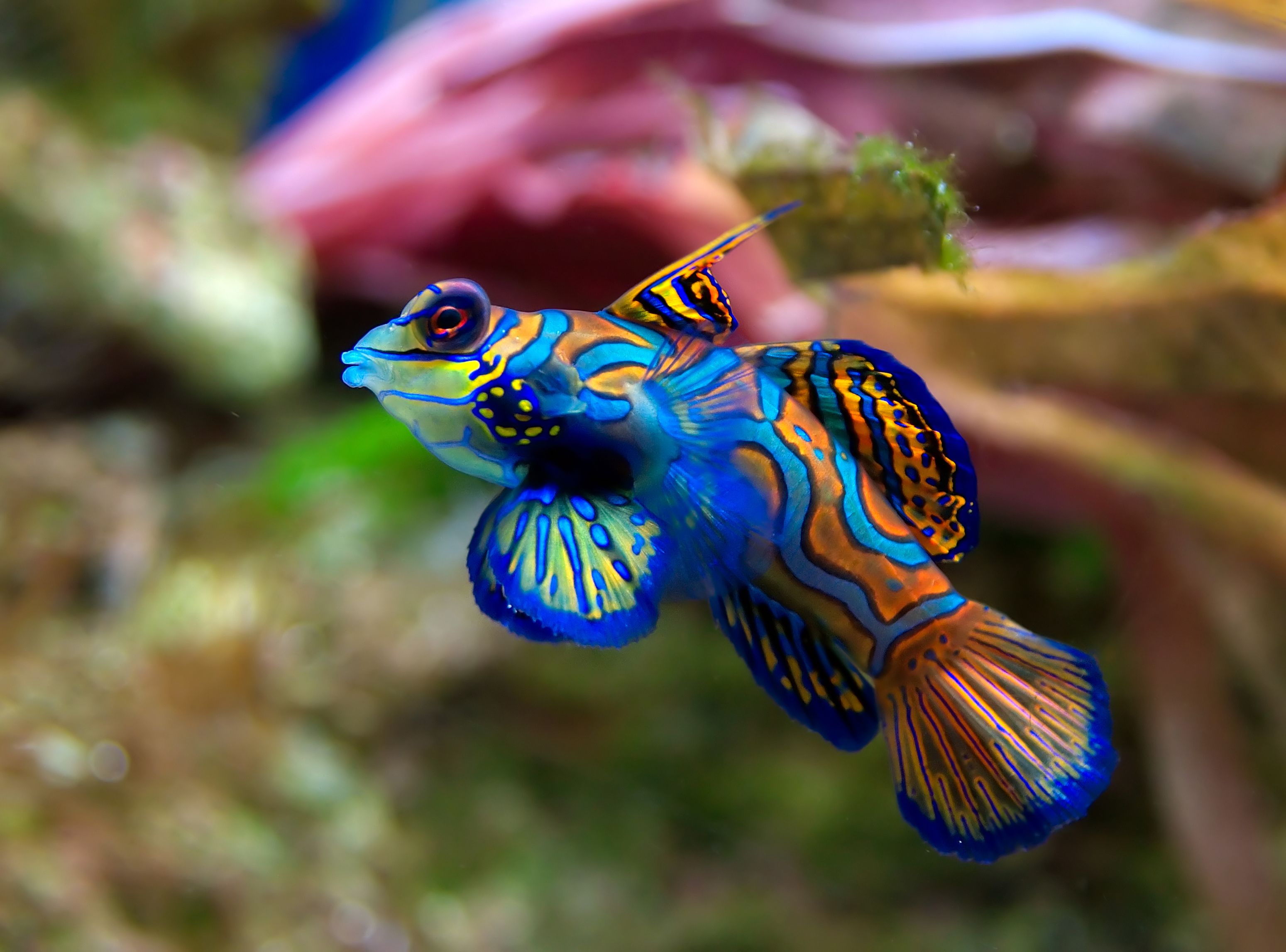
- Synchiropus splendidus

Scientific classification
- Kingdom: Animalia
- Phylum: Chordata
- Class: Actinopterygii
- Order: Syngnathiformes
- Family: Callionymidae
- Genus: Synchiropus; Gill, 1859

Type species
- Callionymus lateralis Richardson, 1844

Synonyms
- Acommissura Fricke, 2016; Anaoroides Fricke, 2016; Eocallionymus Nakabo, 1982; Foetorepus Whitley, 1931; Minysynchiropus Nakabo, 1982; Neosynchiropus Nalbant, 1979; Neosynchiropus Nakabo, 1982; Orbonymus Whitley, 1947; Pterosynchiropus Nakabo, 1982; Yerutius Whitley, 1931

= Synchiropus =

Genus of fishes

Synchiropus is a genus of Syngnathiform fish that belongs to the family Callionymidae. It is mainly found in the tropical waters of the Indo-Pacific region.

== Taxonomy ==
This genus has a complex taxonomic history, with differing authorities accepting subgenera, such as Foetorepus and Neosynchiropus, or lumping them into one genus.

=== Species ===
This genus contains many described species. The currently recognized species in this genus are:

- Synchiropus agassizii (Goode & T. H. Bean, 1888) (Spotfin dragonet)
- Synchiropus atrilabiatus (Garman, 1899) (Antler dragonet)
- Synchiropus bartelsi R. Fricke, 1981 (Bartel's dragonet)
- Synchiropus circularis R. Fricke, 1984 (Circled dragonet)
- Synchiropus claudiae R. Fricke, 1990 (Claudia's dragonet)
- Synchiropus corallinus (C. H. Gilbert, 1905) (Exclamation point dragonet)
- Synchiropus delandi Fowler, 1943 (Deland's dragonet)
- Synchiropus flavistrigatus R. Fricke, Ordines & Ramírez-Amaro, 2022
- Synchiropus goodenbeani (Nakabo & Hartel, 1999) (Pale-fin dragonet)
- Synchiropus grandoculis R. Fricke, 2000 (Western Australian big-eye dragonet)
- Synchiropus grinnelli Fowler, 1941 (Philippines dragonet)
- Synchiropus hawaiiensis R. Fricke, 2000 (Hawaiian big-eye dragonet)
- Synchiropus kamoharai (Nakabo, 1983)
- Synchiropus kanmuensis (Nakabo, Yamamoto & C. H. Chen, 1983) (Kanmu dragonet)
- Synchiropus kinmeiensis (Nakabo, Yamamoto & C. H. Chen, 1983) (Kinmei dragonet)
- Synchiropus kiyoae R. Fricke & Zaiser, 1983 (Kiyo's dragonet)
- Synchiropus laddi L. P. Schultz, 1960 (Ladd's dragonet)
- Synchiropus lateralis (J. Richardson, 1844) (Chinese ornate dragonet)
- Synchiropus lineolatus (Valenciennes, 1837) (Indian ornate dragonet)
- Synchiropus marmoratus (W. K. H. Peters, 1855) (Marbled dragonet)
- Synchiropus minutulus R. Fricke, 1981 (Minute flag-fin dragonet)
- Synchiropus monacanthus J. L. B. Smith, 1935 (Deep-water dragonet)
- Synchiropus morrisoni L. P. Schultz, 1960 (Morrison's dragonet)
- Synchiropus moyeri Zaiser & R. Fricke, 1985 (Moyer's dragonet)
- Synchiropus novaecaledoniae R. Fricke, 1993 (West Jumeau big-eye dragonet)
- Synchiropus novaehiberniensis R. Fricke, 2016 (New Ireland dragonet)
- Synchiropus orientalis (Bloch & J. G. Schneider, 1801)
- Synchiropus orstom R. Fricke, 2000 (Orstom dragonet)
- Synchiropus phaeton (Günther, 1861) (Phaeton dragonet)
- Synchiropus picturatus (W. K. H. Peters, 1877) (Picturesque dragonet)
- Synchiropus postulus J. L. B. Smith, 1963 (Dwarf dragonet)
- Synchiropus rameus (McCulloch, 1926) (High-finned dragonet)
- Synchiropus randalli G. T. Clark & R. Fricke, 1985 (Randall's dragonet)
- Synchiropus richeri R. Fricke, 2000 (Richer's dragonet)
- Synchiropus rosulentus J. E. Randall, 1999 (Rosy dragonet)
- Synchiropus rubrovinctus (C. H. Gilbert, 1905) (Tiny Hawaiian dragonet)
- Synchiropus sechellensis Regan, 1908 (Seychelles dragonet)
- Synchiropus signipinnis R. Fricke, 2000 (Chesterfield big-eye dragonet)
- Synchiropus splendidus (Herre, 1927) (Mandarin dragonet)
- Synchiropus springeri R. Fricke, 1983 (Springer's dragonet)
- Synchiropus stellatus J. L. B. Smith, 1963 (Starry dragonet)
- Synchiropus sycorax Y. K. Tea & A. C. Gill, 2016 (Ruby dragonet)
- Synchiropus tudorjonesi G. R. Allen & Erdmann, 2012 (Red-back dragonet)
- Synchiropus valdiviae (Trunov, 1981) (Valdivia dragonet)
- Synchiropus zamboangana Seale, 1910 (Zamboangan dragonet)
