= Synchiropus kamoharai =

Scientific classification
- Kingdom: Animalia
- Phylum: Chordata
- Class: Actinopterygii
- Order: Syngnathiformes
- Family: Callionymidae
- Genus: Synchiropus
- Species: S. kamoharai

Binomial name
- Synchiropus kamoharai (Nakabo, 1983)

Species of fish

Synchiropus kamoharai is a species of fish in the family Callionymidae, the dragonets.

== Etymology ==
The fish is named in honor of ichthyologist Toshiji Kamohara (1901–1972), of the Kochi University, who was the first to find and record this species.
