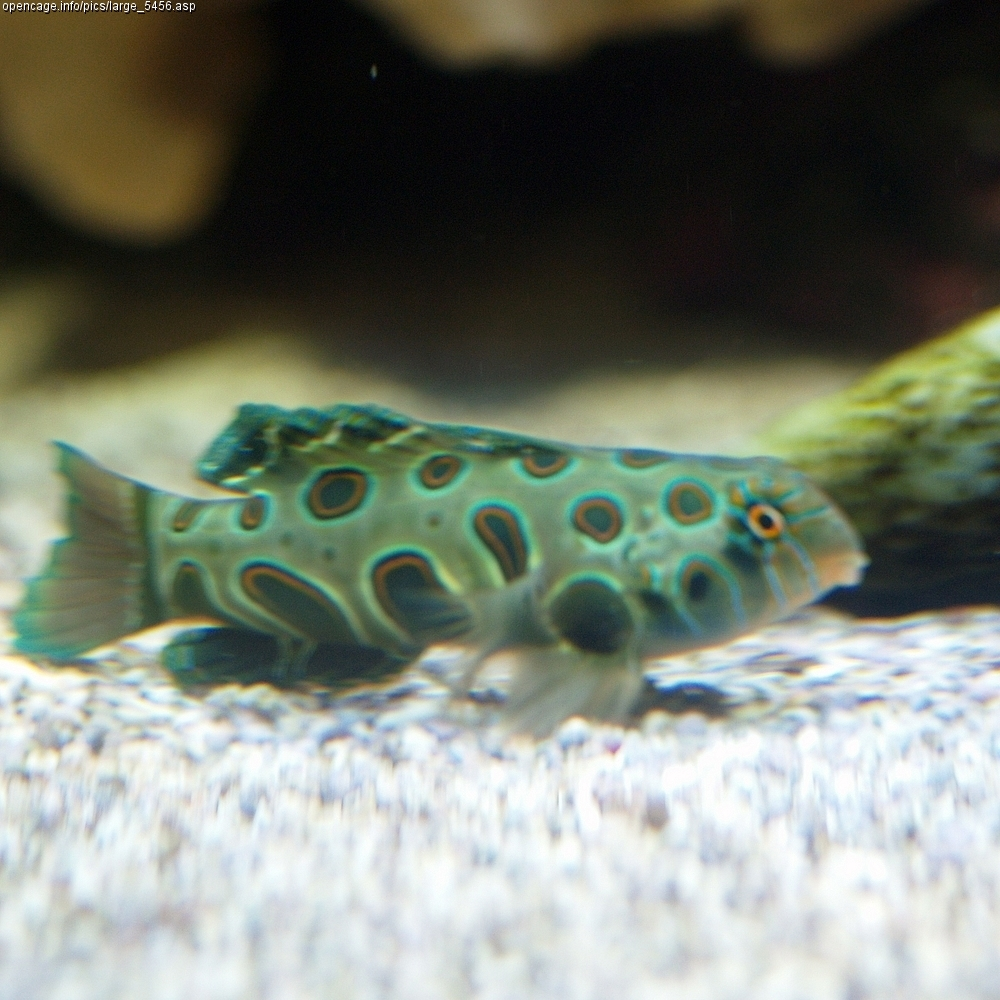

Scientific classification
- Kingdom: Animalia
- Phylum: Chordata
- Class: Actinopterygii
- Order: Syngnathiformes
- Family: Callionymidae
- Genus: Synchiropus
- Species: S. picturatus

Binomial name
- Synchiropus picturatus (Peters, 1877)

Synonyms
- Callionymus picturatus Peters, 1877; Pterosynchiropus picturatus (Peters, 1877)

= Picturesque dragonet =

Species of fish

The picturesque dragonet (Synchiropus picturatus) is a brightly colored marine ray-finned fish from the dragonet family Callionymidae. It is native to the Indo-West Pacific: Philippines, eastern Indonesia and northwest Australia. It occasionally makes its way into the aquarium trade, where it is also called the spotted mandarin, psychedelic mandarin or target mandarin.

== Description ==
The picturesque dragonet may grow to 7 cm (2.8 in) in length.

== Biology ==
The skin of the picturesque dragonet is covered by a thick layer of slime, which inhibits many types of parasitic infection and minimizes the risk of disease following stress or physical trauma. It also seems to help the fish from more aggressive fish.

The picturesque dragonet is one of only two vertebrates known to have blue coloring because of cellular pigment, the other being the mandarinfish (Synchiropus splendidus), which is a closely related species. In all other known cases, the color blue comes from thin-film interference from piles of flat, thin and reflecting purine crystals.

== In the aquarium ==
The picturesque dragonet is quite harmless to humans and coexists peacefully with other species. It is recommended to keep the tank temperature between 24–28 °C (75–82 °F) and maintain a pH level of 8.2-8.4.
