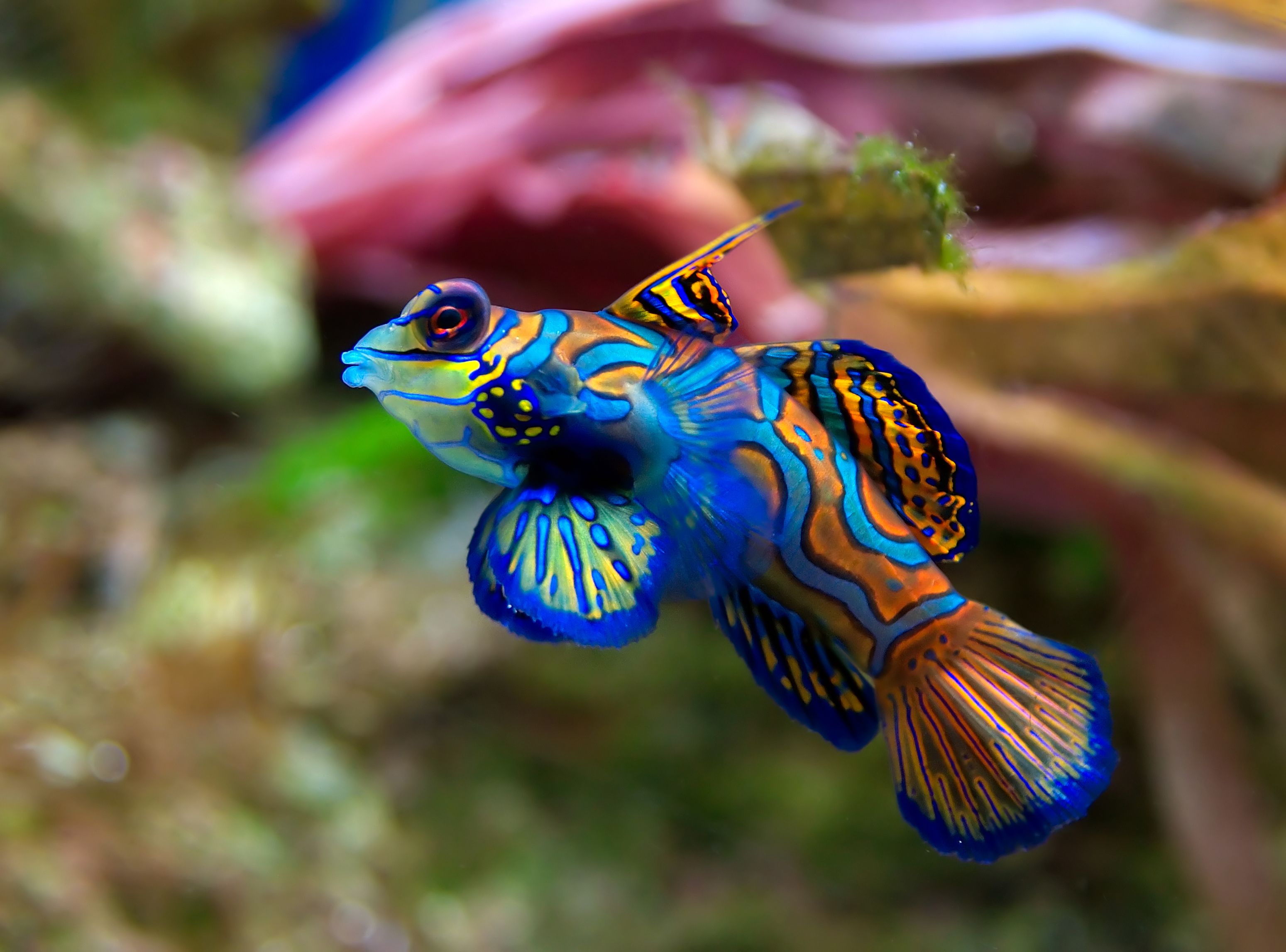

Conservation status
- Least Concern (IUCN 3.1)

Scientific classification
- Kingdom: Animalia
- Phylum: Chordata
- Class: Actinopterygii
- Order: Syngnathiformes
- Family: Callionymidae
- Genus: Synchiropus
- Species: S. splendidus

Binomial name
- Synchiropus splendidus (Herre, 1927)

Synonyms
- Callionymus splendidus Herre, 1927; Neosynchiropus splendidus (Herre, 1927); Pterosynchiropus splendidus (Herre, 1927)

= Synchiropus splendidus =

Species of fish

Synchiropus splendidus, the mandarinfish or mandarin dragonet, is a small, brightly colored member of the dragonet family, which is popular in the saltwater aquarium trade. The mandarinfish is native to the Pacific, ranging approximately from the Ryukyu Islands south to Australia. It can usually be found in some of the warmer waters.

== Taxonomy and etymology ==
The mandarinfish was first described as Callionymus splendidus in 1927 by Albert William Herre, an American ichthyologist working in the Philippines. It was later placed in genus Synchiropus. The generic name Synchiropus is from Ancient Greek syn-, meaning "together", and -chiropus, meaning "hand-foot". The specific epithet splendidus is from the Latin for "bright" or "glittering." The common name of the mandarinfish comes from its extremely vivid colouration, evoking the robes of an Imperial Chinese mandarin. Other common names include mandarin goby, green mandarin, striped mandarinfish, striped dragonet, green dragonet and sometimes psychedelic mandarinfish. The similarly named mandarin fish (Siniperca chuatsi), properly known as the Chinese perch, is distantly related.

The mandarinfish belongs to the perciform family Callionymidae, the dragonets, which counts 10 genera and more than 182 species. Genus Synchiropus counts 51 species, divided into 10 subgenera. The mandarinfish is in subgenus Synchiropus (Pterosynchiropus) along with the S. occidentalis and S. picturatus.

== Description ==
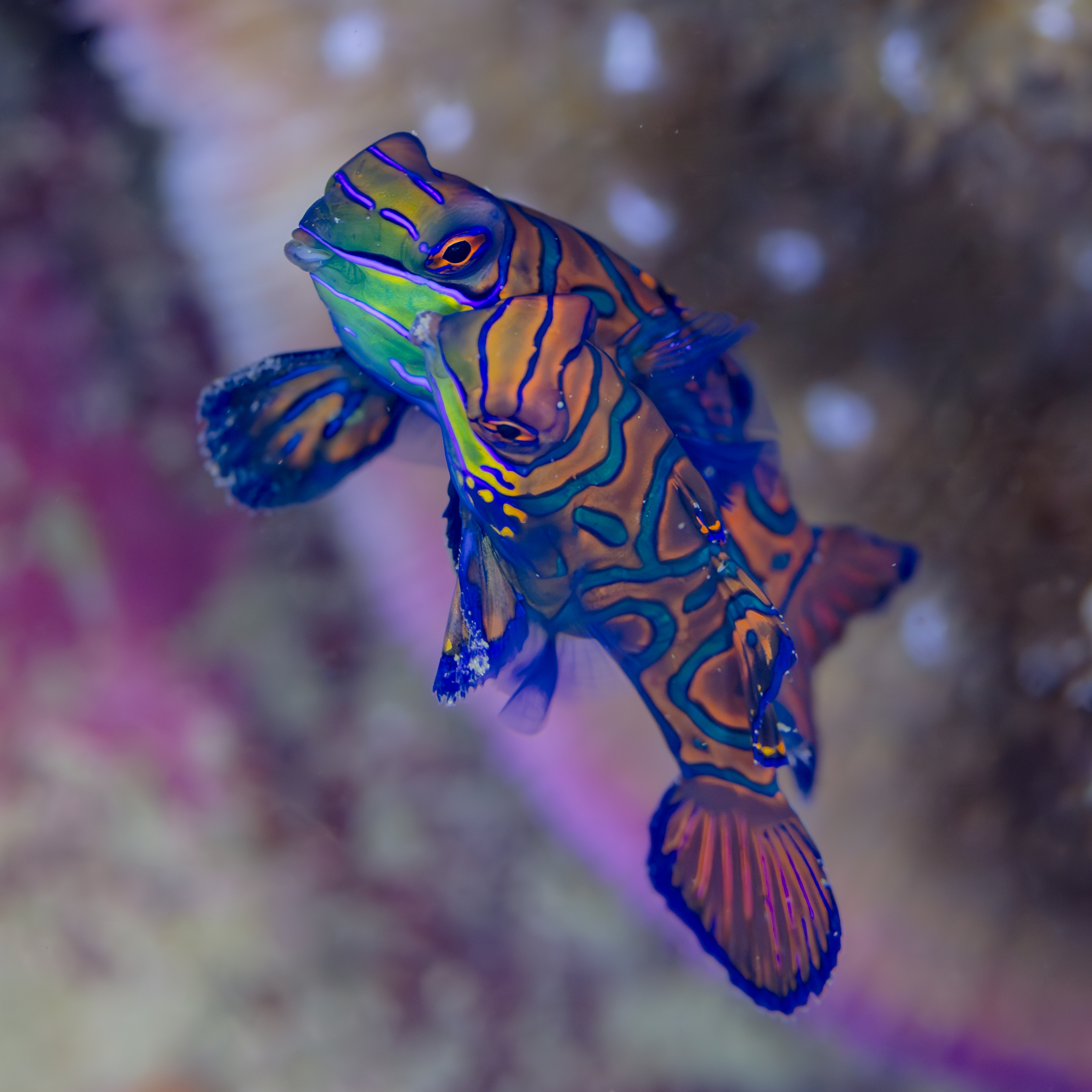
Couple mating in Anilao, Philippines

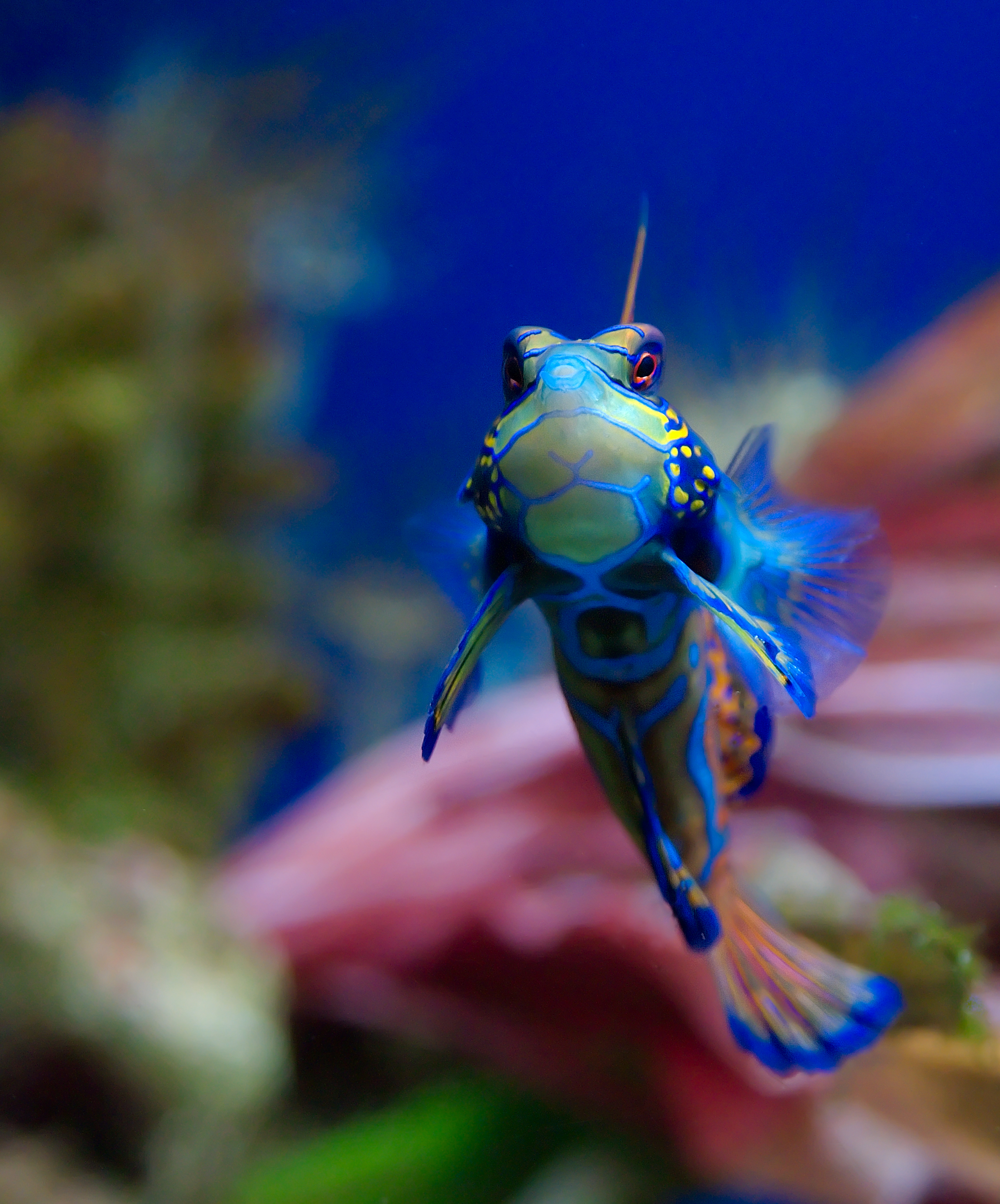
The mandarinfish viewed from the front

S. splendidus is one of only two vertebrate species known to have blue colouring because of cellular pigment, the other being the closely related psychedelic mandarin (S. picturatus).

The name "cyanophore" was proposed for the blue chromatophores, or pigment-containing and light-reflecting cells. In all other known cases, the colour blue is structural, as it comes from thin-film interference from piles of flat, thin and reflecting purine crystals.

The mandarinfish has a body shape similar to a goby, though this is the only resemblance between the two. The vivid coloration sports a bright blue background, with swirly orange stripes and a blue-greenish face with bold blue stripes. The large pelvic fins are used for 'walking' on the seafloor and are often mistakenly seen as the pectoral fins. The real pectorals are located almost at the center and are nearly transparent, with a tinge of fin, the anal fins and on part of the tail, the rest of which is striped in vibrant orange and blue. The dorsal fin, which is exceptionally tall in males, has a striking orange-and blue design as well. The eyes are usually red with black pupils. Different varieties sport different markings and colors. The green mandarin is the fish that has been described. The red mandarin is the same species, but its pelvic fins and what would be orange is red. In some rare cases, the entire dragonet is red with black stripes. The spotted mandarin is light gray-green with black, pink and blue spots.

Mandarinfish are reef dwellers, preferring sheltered lagoons and inshore reefs. While they are slow-moving and fairly common within their range, they are not easily seen due to their bottom-feeding habit and their small size (reaching only about 6 cm). They feed primarily on small crustaceans and other invertebrates.

=== Diet ===
Based on the gut analyses of seven wild fish Sadovy et al. (2001) determined that the mandarinfish has a mixed diet that consists of harpacticoid copepods, polychaete worms, small gastropods, gammaridean amphipods, fish eggs and ostracods. In the wild, feeding is continuous during daytime; the fish peck selectively at small prey trapped on coral substrate in a home range of many square meters.

== Relationship to humans ==
Despite their popularity in the aquarium trade, mandarinfish are considered difficult to keep, as their feeding habits are very specific. Some fish never adapt to aquarium life, refusing to eat anything but live amphipods and copepods (as in the wild); though individuals that do acclimatize to aquarium food are considered to be quite hardy and highly resistant to diseases, such as marine ich. They are less likely to contract marine ich because they do not have the typical skin type that is affected by this disease. Mandarinfish also have a layer of debatably smelly and bitter slime instead of scales, which blocks out disease and probably also discourages predators, implying their bright coloration is aposematic.

The mandarinfish appeared on a 39-kip postage stamp from Laos issued in 1987, and a 40-cent postage stamp of the Federated States of Micronesia issued on 26 August 1993.
