= Synchiropus minutulus =

Scientific classification
- Kingdom: Animalia
- Phylum: Chordata
- Class: Actinopterygii
- Order: Syngnathiformes
- Family: Callionymidae
- Genus: Synchiropus
- Species: S. minutulus

Binomial name
- Synchiropus minutulus R. Fricke, 1981

Species of fish

Synchiropus minutulus, the minute flagfin dragonet, is a species of fish in the dragonet family Callionymidae. It is found in the western Indian Ocean.

== Description ==
This species reaches a length of 2.3 cm (0.91 in).

== Etymology ==
The fish's name means "very small" or "pygmy".
