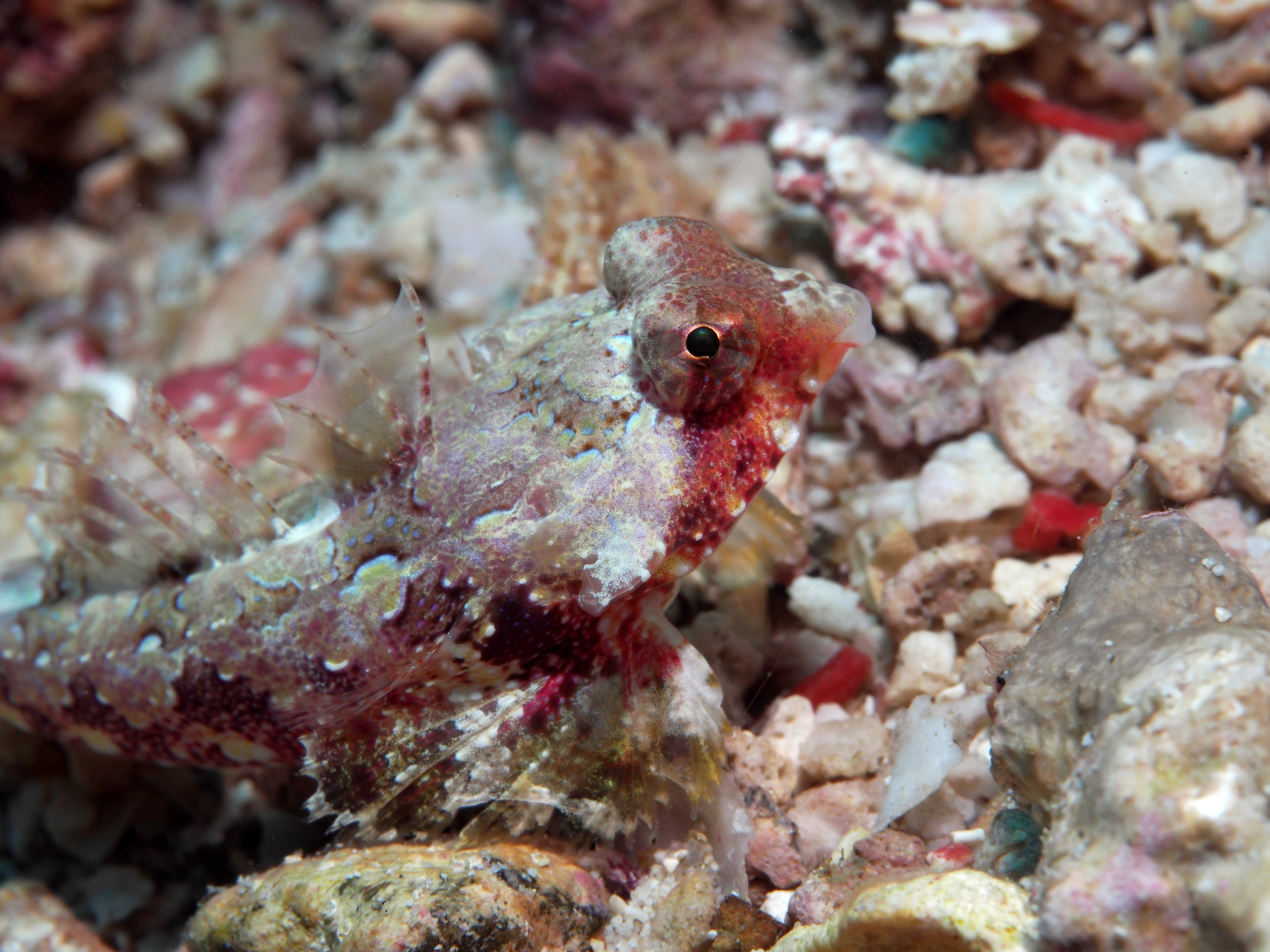

Conservation status
- Least Concern (IUCN 3.1)

Scientific classification
- Kingdom: Animalia
- Phylum: Chordata
- Class: Actinopterygii
- Order: Syngnathiformes
- Family: Callionymidae
- Genus: Synchiropus
- Species: S. bartelsi

Binomial name
- Synchiropus bartelsi R. Fricke, 1981

= Synchiropus bartelsi =

Species of fish

Synchiropus bartelsi, also known as Bartel's dragonet, is a species of fish in the dragonet family Callionymidae. It is found in the western-central Pacific Ocean from the Philippines to southern Indonesia.

== Description ==
This species reaches a length of 4.5 cm (1.8 in).

== Etymology ==
The fish bears the name of German biologist Harald Bartels, who is from Braunschweig.
