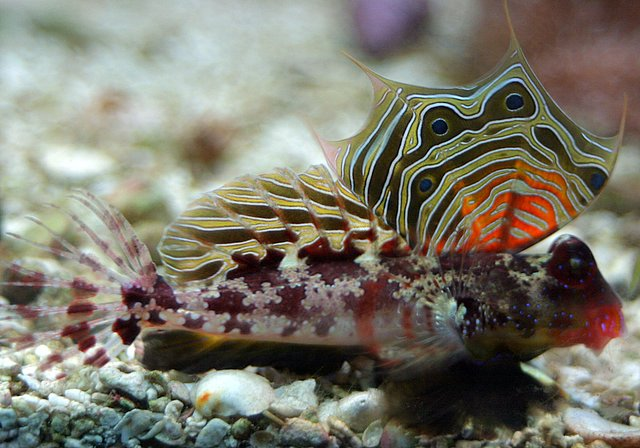
- Male Scooter Dragonet

Scientific classification
- Kingdom: Animalia
- Phylum: Chordata
- Class: Actinopterygii
- Division: Teleostei
- Order: Syngnathiformes
- Family: Callionymidae
- Genus: Neosynchiropus
- Species: N. ocellatus

Binomial name
- Neosynchiropus ocellatus (Pallas, 1770)

Synonyms
- Synchiropus ocellatus (Pallas, 1770); Callionymus ocellatus Pallas, 1770

= Ocellated dragonet =

Species of fish

The ocellated dragonet, scooter dragonet or scooter blenny (Neosynchiropus ocellatus) is a species of marine ray-finned fish in the family Callionymidae. It is native to parts of the Pacific Ocean, and can be found from southern Japan to the Marquesan Islands.

== Taxonomy ==
This species is placed in Synchiropus by some authors (since some consider that Neosynchiropus is a synonym of Synchiropus). Also, despite one of its common names being "scooter blenny", the ocellated dragonet is not a blenny, and is instead allied with seahorses and pipefishes.

== Description ==
The scooter dragonet grows to approximately 8 cm (3.1 in). It is brown and tan with a striped or spotted pattern; males are usually more colorful, and possess a large sail-like dorsal fin that is bright orange at the base. When viewed from above, the scooter dragonet is distinctly diamond-shaped, with the horizontal pectoral fins located at the two widest points.

== Habitat ==
The scooter dragonet is a reef-associated bottom-dwelling fish that inhabits shallow, tropical waters, usually sandy lagoons or rocky reefs.

== Biology ==
This species tends to form loose congregations of several individuals, but does not exhibit schooling behavior or other forms of social cooperation. The diet consists almost entirely of copepods; however, in captivity, the scooter dragonet can often be acclimated to consuming frozen or even artificial foods (such as flakes).
