= Synchiropus atrilabiatus =

Conservation status
- Least Concern (IUCN 3.1)

Scientific classification
- Kingdom: Animalia
- Phylum: Chordata
- Class: Actinopterygii
- Order: Syngnathiformes
- Family: Callionymidae
- Genus: Synchiropus
- Species: S. atrilabiatus

Binomial name
- Synchiropus atrilabiatus (Garman), 1899

Synonyms
- Callionymus atrilabiatus Garman, 1899

Species of fish

Synchiropus atrilabiatus, the antler dragonet, is a species of fish in the dragonet family Callionymidae. It is found in the eastern Pacific Ocean.

== Description ==
This species reaches a length of 16.7 cm (6.6 in).
