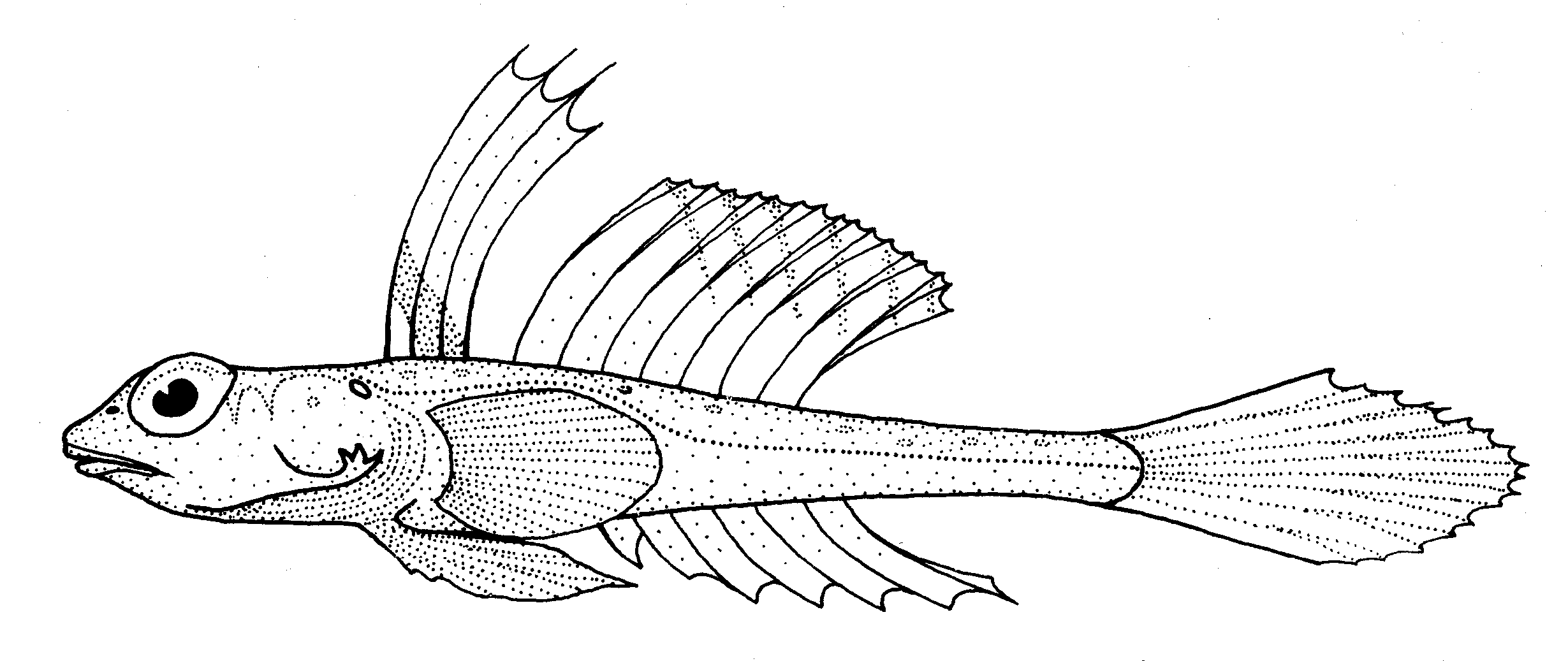
- Drawing by Dr Tony Ayling

Scientific classification
- Kingdom: Animalia
- Phylum: Chordata
- Class: Actinopterygii
- Order: Syngnathiformes
- Family: Callionymidae
- Genus: Foetorepus
- Species: F. phasis

Binomial name
- Foetorepus phasis (Günther, 1880)

Synonyms
- Callionymus phasis Günther, 1880

= Bight stinkfish =

Species of fish

The bight stinkfish (Foetorepus phasis) is a species of dragonet of the family Callionymidae, found in the eastern Indian and southwest Pacific Oceans, at depths of between 160 and 200 m. Length is up to 13 cm.
