= Synchiropus hawaiiensis =

Scientific classification
- Kingdom: Animalia
- Phylum: Chordata
- Class: Actinopterygii
- Order: Syngnathiformes
- Family: Callionymidae
- Genus: Synchiropus
- Species: S. hawaiiensis

Binomial name
- Synchiropus hawaiiensis R. Fricke, 2000

Species of fish

Synchiropus hawaiiensis, the Hawaiian bigeye dragonet, is a species of fish in the family Callionymidae, the dragonets. It is found in the Hawaiian Islands.

== Etymology ==
The fish is named after Hawaii where the fish is found.
