= Synchiropus claudiae =

Conservation status
- Least Concern (IUCN 3.1)

Scientific classification
- Kingdom: Animalia
- Phylum: Chordata
- Class: Actinopterygii
- Order: Syngnathiformes
- Family: Callionymidae
- Genus: Synchiropus
- Species: S. claudiae

Binomial name
- Synchiropus claudiae R. Fricke, 1990

Species of fish

Synchiropus claudiae, also known as Claudia's dragonet, is a species of fish in the dragonet family Callionymidae. It is found in the western-central Pacific Ocean.

== Description ==
The maximum length of this species is 2.2 cm (0.87 in).

== Etymology ==
The fish is named in honor of Fricke's sister, Claudia Grünhagen, because of her "continued interest in and support of [his] studies on callionymid fishes".
