= Synchiropus grinnelli =

Scientific classification
- Kingdom: Animalia
- Phylum: Chordata
- Class: Actinopterygii
- Order: Syngnathiformes
- Family: Callionymidae
- Genus: Synchiropus
- Species: S. grinnelli

Binomial name
- Synchiropus grinnelli Fowler, 1941

Species of fish

Synchiropus grinnelli, the Philippines dragonet, is a species of fish in the dragonet family Callionymidae . It is found in the western-central Pacific from the Philippines to Indonesia.

This species reaches a length of 6.5 cm (2.6 in).

== Etymology ==
The fish is named in honor of Joseph Grinnell, who was the director of Museum of Vertebrate Zoology.
