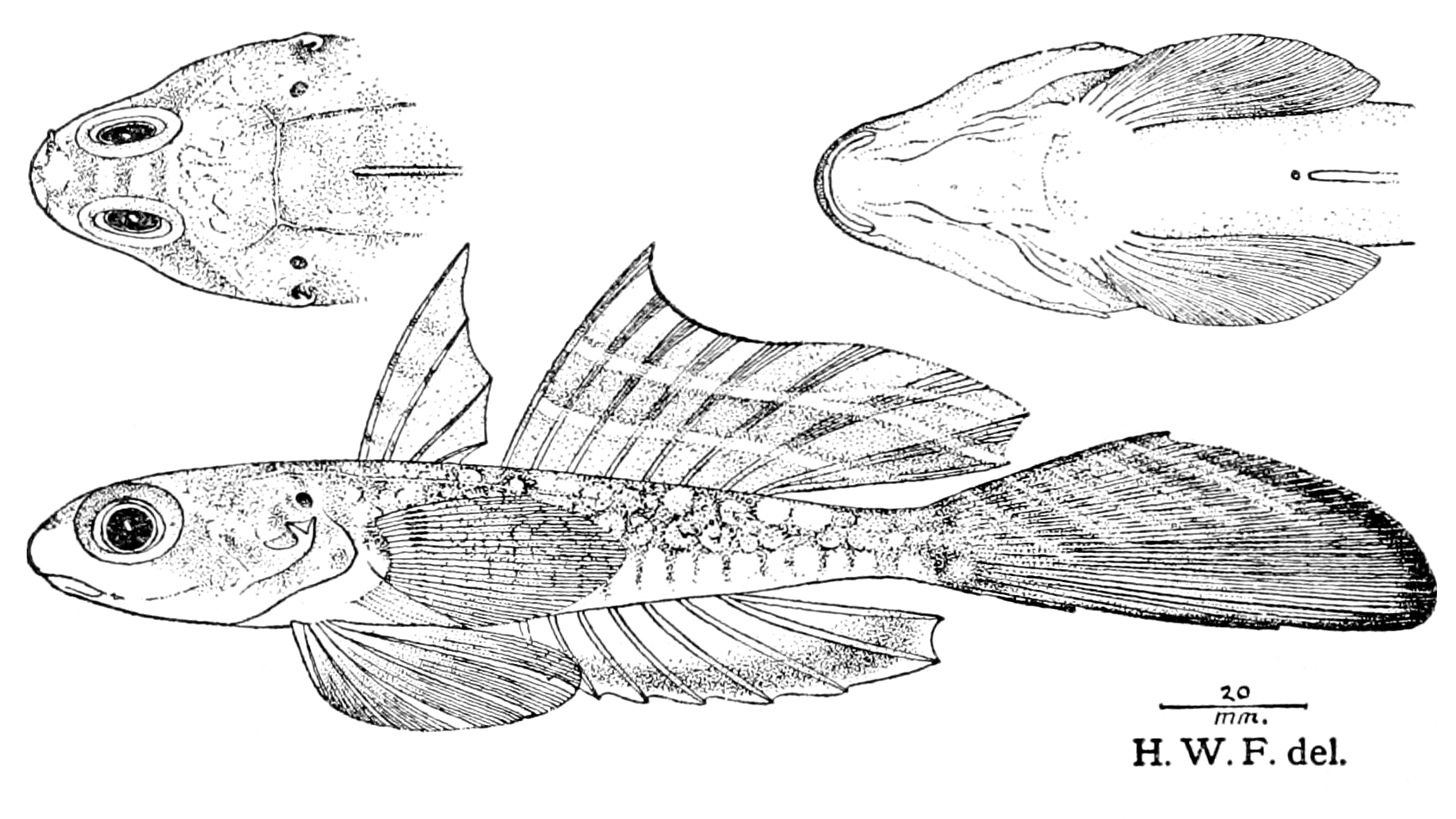

Scientific classification
- Domain: Eukaryota
- Kingdom: Animalia
- Phylum: Chordata
- Class: Actinopterygii
- Order: Callionymiformes
- Family: Callionymidae
- Genus: Synchiropus
- Species: S. delandi

Binomial name
- Synchiropus delandi Fowler, 1943

= Synchiropus delandi =

Species of fish

Synchiropus delandi, also known as Deland's dragonet, is a species of fish in the dragonet family Callionymidae. It is found in the western-central Pacific from the Philippines to Indonesia.

== Etymology ==
The fish is named in honor of Judson de Land of Philadelphia, Pennsylvania, a physician, to whom Fowler was “indebted for American fishes”.
