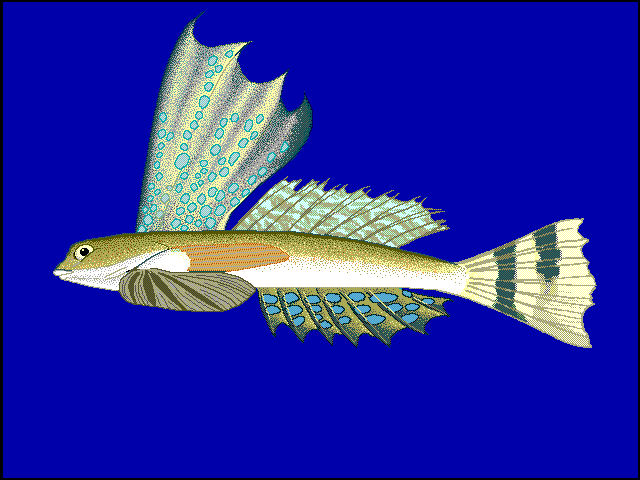

Scientific classification
- Domain: Eukaryota
- Kingdom: Animalia
- Phylum: Chordata
- Class: Actinopterygii
- Order: Callionymiformes
- Family: Callionymidae
- Genus: Synchiropus
- Species: S. rameus

Binomial name
- Synchiropus rameus (McCulloch, 1926)

Synonyms
- Callionymus rameus McCulloch, 1926; Orbonymus rameus (McCulloch, 1926)

= High-finned dragonet =

Species of fish

The high-finned dragonet (Synchiropus rameus) is a species of dragonet native to the Pacific Ocean off the coasts of northwestern Australia as well as New Caledonia, where it favors substrates consisting of sand or rubble and reaches a length of 15 centimetres (5.9 in) TL.
