= Synchiropus sechellensis =

Scientific classification
- Kingdom: Animalia
- Phylum: Chordata
- Class: Actinopterygii
- Order: Syngnathiformes
- Family: Callionymidae
- Genus: Synchiropus
- Species: S. sechellensis

Binomial name
- Synchiropus sechellensis Regan, 1908

Synonyms
- Synchiropus altivelis Regan, 1908

Species of fish

Synchiropus sechellensis, the Seychelles dragonet, is a species of marine ray-finned fish, a dragonet from the family Callionymidae. It is found in the Indo-Pacific from the Red Sea south to the Seychelles and the Maldives and east as far as New Caledonia. Following a likely introduction via the Suez Canal, it was first recorded in the Mediterranean Sea in 2014; where it is found on rare occasions from Alexandria (Egypt) to the Gulf of Antalya (Turkey).

This species was first formally described by Charles Tate Regan in 1908 with the type locality given as Seychelles.
