= Synchiropus zamboangana =

Conservation status
- Data Deficient (IUCN 3.1)

Scientific classification
- Kingdom: Animalia
- Phylum: Chordata
- Class: Actinopterygii
- Order: Syngnathiformes
- Family: Callionymidae
- Genus: Synchiropus
- Species: S. zamboangana

Binomial name
- Synchiropus zamboangana Seale, 1910

Synonyms
- Synchiropus zamboanganus Seale, 1910

Species of fish

Synchiropus zamboangana, the Zamboangan dragonet, is a species of ray-finned fish within the family Callionymidae. The species is believed to be native to the Philippines, as only 2 specimens have been caught off Zamboanga in 1909. Due to it only having 2 specimens little is known about its population or habitat, but its assumed to live alongside continental shelves in deep waters inhabiting sandy and muddy substrate, similar to members of its genus. It has been classified as 'Data deficient' by the IUCN Red List as little is known about its ecology, population and potential threats.
