= Synchiropus postulus =

Scientific classification
- Domain: Eukaryota
- Kingdom: Animalia
- Phylum: Chordata
- Class: Actinopterygii
- Order: Callionymiformes
- Family: Callionymidae
- Genus: Synchiropus
- Species: S. postulus

Binomial name
- Synchiropus postulus J. L. B. Smith, 1963

Species of fish

Synchiropus postulus, the dwarf dragonet, is a species of fish in the dragonet family Callionymidae. It is found in the western Indian Ocean.

== Description ==
This species reaches a length of 2.6 cm (1.0 in).
