= Synchiropus randalli =

Scientific classification
- Domain: Eukaryota
- Kingdom: Animalia
- Phylum: Chordata
- Class: Actinopterygii
- Order: Callionymiformes
- Family: Callionymidae
- Genus: Synchiropus
- Species: S. randalli

Binomial name
- Synchiropus randalli G. T. Clark & R. Fricke, 1985

Species of fish

Synchiropus randalli, also known as Randall's dragonet, is a species of fish in the dragonet family Callionymidae. It is found in the south-eastern Pacific Ocean off of Chile.

== Description ==
This species reaches a length of 3.6 cm (1.4 in).

== Etymology ==
The fish is named in honor of ichthyologist John E. Randall, of the Bishop Museum in Honolulu, for his many contributions to the knowledge of the fishes of Easter Island. Where randalli appears to be endemic. Randall also helped collect the type specimen.
