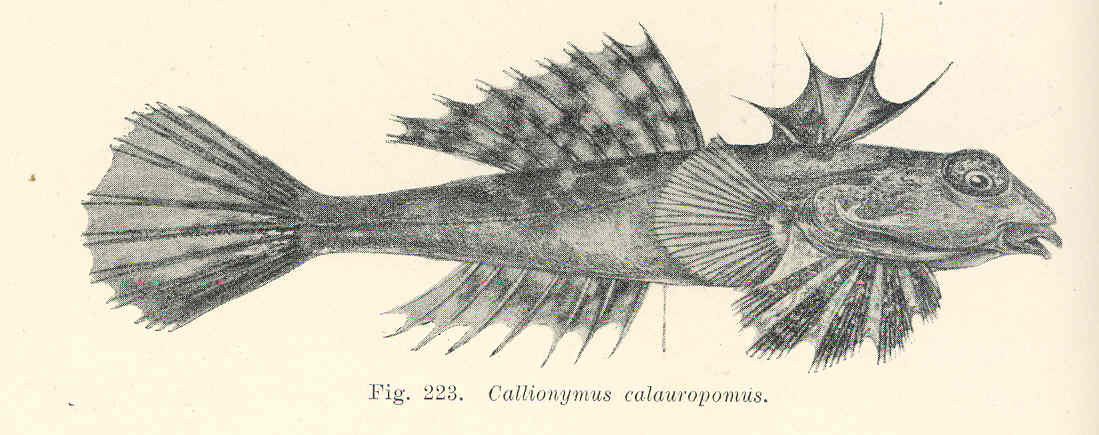

Scientific classification
- Kingdom: Animalia
- Phylum: Chordata
- Class: Actinopterygii
- Order: Syngnathiformes
- Family: Callionymidae
- Genus: Foetorepus
- Species: F. calauropomus

Binomial name
- Foetorepus calauropomus (Richardson, 1844)

Synonyms
- Callionymus calauropomus Richardson, 1844; Synchiropus calauropomus (Richardson, 1844); Callionymus achates De Vis, 1883

= Common stinkfish =

Species of fish

The common stinkfish (Foetorepus calauropomus), also known as the crookspined dragonet, is a species of dragonet found in temperate waters across the eastern part of the Indian Ocean, populating areas around Australia, as far as Tasmania. This species can grow up to 30 centimetres (12 in) TL and occurs at depths of 15 metres (49 ft) to 183 metres (600 ft).

== Description ==
The common stinkfish has a long, tapering body with large eyes, a small mouth, blue spots on the cheeks, and a long tailfin. Males have pink bodies, blue markings on their fins and head, and yellow lips with black blotches. Females generally appear paler and lack the black blotches, instead having blue wavy lines on their head.

== Behaviour ==
The species camouflages by resting on the seafloor.
