= Synchiropus novaecaledoniae =

Scientific classification
- Domain: Eukaryota
- Kingdom: Animalia
- Phylum: Chordata
- Class: Actinopterygii
- Order: Callionymiformes
- Family: Callionymidae
- Genus: Synchiropus
- Species: S. novaecaledoniae

Binomial name
- Synchiropus novaecaledoniae R. Fricke, 1981

Species of fish

Synchiropus novaecaledoniae, the West Jumeau bigeye dragonet, is a species of fish in the dragonet family Callionymidae. It is found in the western-central Pacific Ocean.

== Etymology ==
The fish is named after New Caledonia where the fish is found.
