= Synchiropus richeri =

Scientific classification
- Kingdom: Animalia
- Phylum: Chordata
- Class: Actinopterygii
- Order: Syngnathiformes
- Family: Callionymidae
- Genus: Synchiropus
- Species: S. richeri

Binomial name
- Synchiropus richeri R. Fricke, 2000

Species of fish

Synchiropus richeri, also known as Richer's dragonet, is a species of fish in the dragonet family Callionymidae. It is found in the western-central Pacific Ocean.

== Etymology ==
The fish is named in honor of carcinologist Bertrand Richer de Forges, of the Institut de Recherche pour le Développement, in Nouméa, New Caledonia, for his efforts in collecting the type material for this species and for many other New Caledonian callionymids.
