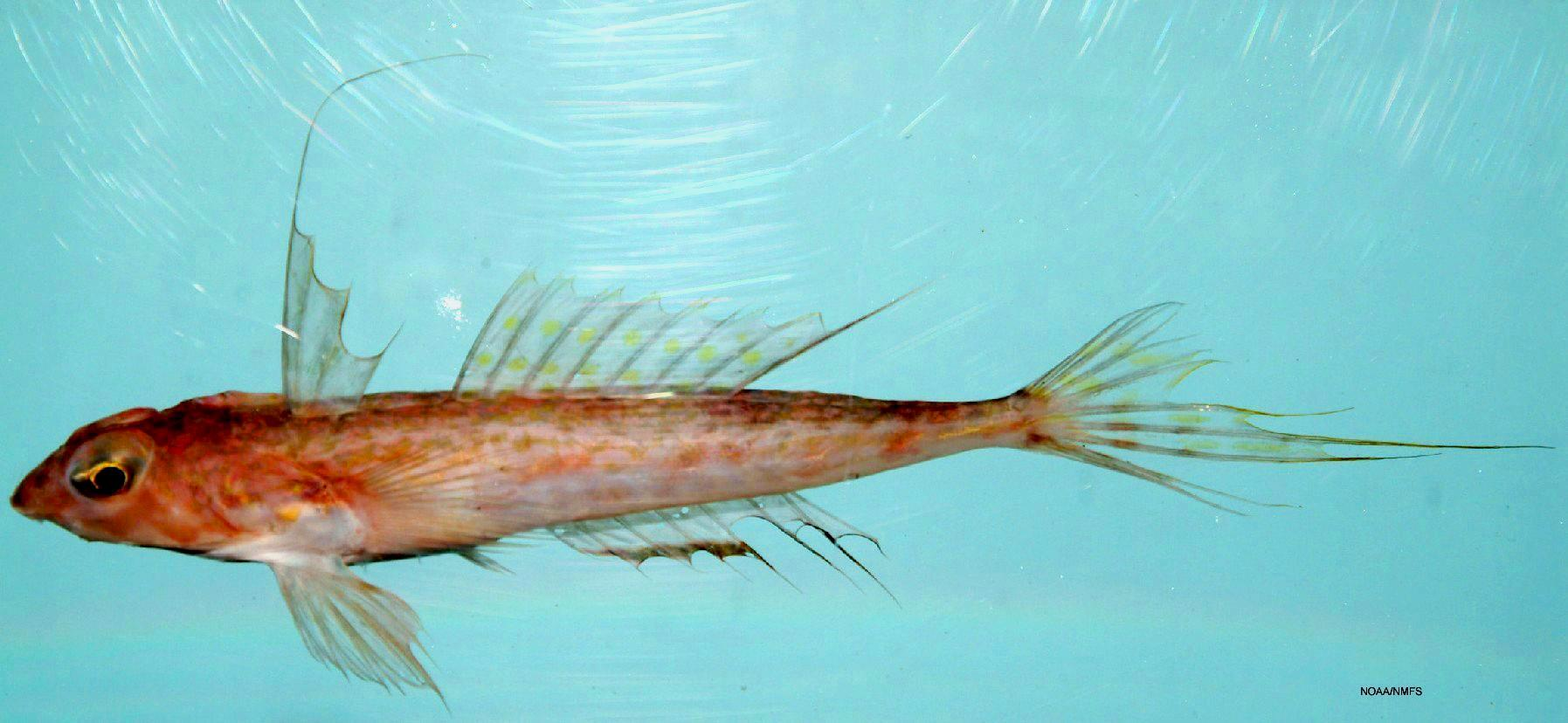
- Spotfin Dragonet (F. agassizii)

Scientific classification
- Kingdom: Animalia
- Phylum: Chordata
- Class: Actinopterygii
- Order: Syngnathiformes
- Family: Callionymidae
- Genus: Foetorepus; Whitley, 1931

Type species
- Callionymus calauropomus J. Richardson, 1844

Species
- See text.

Synonyms
- Yerutius Whitley, 1931

= Foetorepus =

Genus of fishes

Foetorepus is a genus of dragonets. The validity of this genus has been questioned with some experts regarding it as a junior synonym of Synchiropus.

== Species ==
There are currently nine recognized species in this genus:

- Foetorepus agassizii (Goode & T. H. Bean, 1888) (Spotfin dragonet)
- Foetorepus calauropomus (J. Richardson, 1844) (Common stinkfish)
- Foetorepus dagmarae (R. Fricke, 1985)
- Foetorepus garthi (Seale, 1940)
- Foetorepus kamoharai Nakabo, 1983
- Foetorepus masudai Nakabo, 1987
- Foetorepus paxtoni (R. Fricke, 2000)
- Foetorepus phasis (Günther, 1880) (Bight stinkfish)
- Foetorepus talarae (Hildebrand & F. O. Barton, 1949)
