= Eleutherochir =

Scientific classification
- Domain: Eukaryota
- Kingdom: Animalia
- Phylum: Chordata
- Class: Actinopterygii
- Order: Callionymiformes
- Family: Callionymidae
- Genus: Eleutherochir; Bleeker, 1879
- Species: E. opercularis

Binomial name
- Eleutherochir opercularis (Valenciennes, 1837)

Synonyms
- Callionymus opercularis Valenciennes, 1837; Pogonymus goslinei Rao, 1976

Genus of fishes

Eleutherochir is a monotypic genus of dragonets native to the Indian Ocean and the western Pacific Ocean.

It contains a single species, Eleutherochir opercularis, the flap-gilled dragonet which is distributed from Sri Lanka to the east coast of India through the Malay Archipelago to the Ryukyu Islands.

It can be found over shallow sandy and muddy substrates in the sea but has also been recorded entering the mouths of rivers and even to live in freshwater.
