= Spinicapitichthys spiniceps =

Scientific classification
- Kingdom: Animalia
- Phylum: Chordata
- Class: Actinopterygii
- Order: Syngnathiformes
- Family: Callionymidae
- Genus: Spinicapitichthys; Fricke, 1980
- Species: S. spiniceps

Binomial name
- Spinicapitichthys spiniceps (Regan, 1908)

Synonyms
- Callionymus spiniceps Regan, 1908

Species of fish

Spinicapitichthys spiniceps, the Seychelles spiny dragonet, is a species of dragonet known only from the waters around the Seychelles where it is found in weed beds. This species grows to a length of 15.2 centimetres (6.0 in) TL. It is the only species in the monotypic genus Spinicapitichthys which was previously considered to be a subgenus of the large genus Callionymus.
