= Sicyopus zosterophorus =

Conservation status
- Least Concern (IUCN 3.1).

Scientific classification
- Kingdom: Animalia
- Phylum: Chordata
- Class: Actinopterygii
- Order: Gobiiformes
- Family: Oxudercidae
- Genus: Sicyopus
- Species: S. zosterophorus

Binomial name
- Sicyopus zosterophorus (Bleeker, 1856)

Synonyms
- Sicydium balinense Bleeker, 1856; Sicydium zosterophorum Bleeker, 1856

Species of ray-finned fish

Sicyopus zosterophorus is a species of amphidromous goby in the family Oxudercidae. It is widely distributed throughout the Indo-Pacific region, where it inhabits clear, fast-flowing streams, particularly in forested areas with rocky substrates. Like other amphidromous gobies, it migrates between freshwater and marine environments during different stages of its life cycle and feeds primarily on small aquatic invertebrates.

== Etymology ==
The genus name Sicyopus is derived from Greek, from sikyos (or sikya), meaning "cucumber", and pous, meaning "foot". The name likely refers to the elongated body shape or the fused pelvic fins that form a suction disc characteristic of gobies in this group.

The specific epithet zosterophorus is derived from Greek, from zoster, meaning "belt" or "girdle", and phoros, meaning "bearing" or "carrying". The name is thought to refer to banding or belt-like markings present on the body of the species. While occasionally available in the aquarium trade under names like flaming arrow goby, belted rockclimbing goby, or ornate goby, it is often misidentified under the invalid name Sicyopus zosterophorum.

== Description ==
Sicyopus zosterophorus has a fusiform (streamlined) body shape typical of fast-flowing stream gobies. The first dorsal fin contains seven spines, while the second dorsal fin has nine soft rays. The anal fin consists of one spine and nine soft rays. The species typically possesses 33–34 longitudinal scales, 11–12 transverse scales, and 2–6 predorsal scales.

The maxilla extends beyond the midline of the eye, with a prominent upper jaw and fleshy lips. The gill opening is relatively small, extending only from the upper to the lower margin of the pectoral fin base. The head is naked above and behind the eye. Predorsal and postpectoral scales are cycloid, while the remainder of the body is covered with ctenoid scales. The spines of the first dorsal fin are approximately equal in length.

Males and unsexed individuals may reach a maximum standard length of 4.5 cm, while females have been recorded up to 4.2 cm standard length.

== Distribution ==
Sicyopus zosterophorus is widely distributed across the Indo-Pacific. It occurs in Indonesia (including Bali, Sulawesi, New Guinea, and Halmahera), Timor-Leste, the Philippines, Papua New Guinea, Taiwan, Palau, mainland China, and southern Japan (Yaku-shima, Iriomote, and Okinawa). The species is also found in northern Australia and several Pacific island groups, including the Solomon Islands, New Caledonia, Vanuatu, and Fiji

== Habitat and ecology ==
Sicyopus zosterophorus is an amphidromous goby inhabiting marine, freshwater, and brackish environments, typically at depths of 0–5 m. Adults are primarily found in rocky, steep-gradient creeks, usually within 20 km of the sea, where substrates are dominated by bedrock with scattered rocks and boulders. These streams are characterised by clear, well-oxygenated water, minimal aquatic vegetation, and occasional leaf litter, conditions that promote rich biofilm growth on submerged surfaces.

Members of the genus Sicyopus are highly specialised to short, tropical coastal streams, often located above waterfalls or cataracts, which restricts access to most other fish species. Despite this isolation, S. zosterophorus may co-occur and coexist with other gobies, such as Sicyopus cebuensis, Lentipes armatus, Sicyopterus lagocephalus, and Stiphodon surrufus, and invertebrates like amphidromous Macrobrachium shrimp and neritid snails. Its successful colonisation of these niche habitats is facilitated by morphological adaptations and a remarkable breeding strategy, including the ability to climb waterfalls.

Unlike many gobies that graze on biofilm, "Sicyopus zosterophorus" is a specialised predator with a diet largely composed of insects, including chironomid larvae and hymenopterans. Crustaceans, plant material, and phytoplankton make up smaller portions of its diet. Its dietary specialisation is reflected in its morphology, as the species has conical, canine-like teeth adapted for capturing animal prey, classifying it as a carnivorous and insectivorous fish. This selective feeding behaviour also makes it unsuitable for cohabitation with small live invertebrates in aquaria. In captivity, the species thrives in water with a temperature range of 22–26 °C, pH 6.0–7.5, and moderate hardness (36–215 ppm), with increased surface agitation needed to maintain sufficient oxygen at higher temperatures.

== Reproduction ==
Sexual dimorphism in Sicyopus zosterophorus is pronounced. Adult males possess elongated unpaired fins, including an extended first dorsal fin, and exhibit conspicuous coloration, with darker pigmentation on the anterior portion of the body and orange to red hues posteriorly. Females lack elongated fins and are comparatively plain in coloration. Males are territorial and compete with one another for access to suitable habitat and spawning opportunities, with dominance interactions occurring particularly where multiple males occupy the same stretch of stream.

They exhibits a complex amphidromous life cycle, a reproductive strategy shared with other members of the subfamily Sicydiinae. Adults inhabit and reproduce in freshwater streams, where spawning occurs. After hatching, the larvae are passively transported downstream to the sea, where they undergo an obligate pelagic larval phase under marine conditions. Following this period of development, postlarvae return to freshwater and migrate upstream, often ascending steep gradients and, in some cases, climbing over waterfalls or other physical barriers before reaching adult habitats.

Otolith microstructure analysis indicates that the pelagic larval duration averages approximately 55 days, after which metamorphosis occurs during recruitment into freshwater. If larvae fail to reach the marine environment within a short period after hatching, survival is unlikely, highlighting the strong dependence of early development on marine conditions.

Observations of courtship behaviour and occasional spawning have been documented in the wild and in captivity; however, successful rearing of fry has not been achieved for "Sicyopus" species in aquaria. This is generally attributed to their amphidromous reproductive strategy and the requirement for a marine larval phase, which is difficult to replicate under captive conditions.

Amphidromy is thought to confer several ecological advantages. It has been hypothesized that marine larval dispersal facilitates colonisation of newly formed islands, particularly in volcanic regions, and enables recolonisation of freshwater systems following disturbances such as volcanic eruptions or extreme hydrological events. The strategy may also represent a trade-off in which adults benefit from reduced predation pressure in freshwater habitats, despite lower diversity of available food resources compared with marine environments.
