= Sicyopus chloe =

Scientific classification
- Kingdom: Animalia
- Phylum: Chordata
- Class: Actinopterygii
- Order: Gobiiformes
- Family: Oxudercidae
- Genus: Sicyopus
- Species: S. chloe

Binomial name
- Sicyopus chloe Watson, Keith & Marquet, 2001

Freshwater goby species

Sicyopus chloe is a species of small benthopelagic freshwater goby in the subfamily Sicydiinae. It is endemic to the North Province of New Caledonia, where it inhabits the clear, fast-flowing streams along the eastern slopes of Mont Panié. The species was formally described by Watson, Keith & Marquet in 2001.

== Description ==
Adult individuals measure between 21.2 and 42.5 mm in standard length. Males typically reach up to 40.4 mm, while the largest recorded female measured 42.5 mm, features include:

- Slightly filamentous dorsal fin spines (rays 3–6) in males
- First dorsal fin separate from the second dorsal fin (with seven segmented rays)
- Pectoral fins with 13–15 rays; caudal fin with 13 branched rays
- Pelvic disc formed from one spine and five branched rays
- 17 scales in the lateral series and 14–16 in the zigzag series

== Taxonomy ==
Sicyopus chloe is sometimes placed in the subgenus Smilosicyopus, a group of sicydiine gobies characterized by well-developed canine teeth in both jaws, particularly in males. Members of this subgenus occur widely across the Indo-Pacific region, from eastern Indonesia to the Marquesas Islands and from southern Japan to New Caledonia.

== Distribution ==
S. chloe is known only from the North Province of New Caledonia. It occupies steep, clear, high-gradient freshwater streams with rocky substrates flowing down the eastern slopes of Mont Panié.

== Ecology ==
Like many sicydiine gobies, Sicyopus chloe inhabits fast-moving, oxygen-rich waters where it shelters among rocks and crevices. It is a carnivorous species and feeds primarily on aquatic insects and crustaceans typical of mountain stream environments.

== Comparisons ==
Sicyopus chloe differs from other species in the (sub)genus Smilosicyopus through its combination of:

- well-developed canine teeth in both jaws,
- prominent dark V-shaped head marking,
- conspicuous nape spotting,
- and sexual dichromatism.

Other members of Smilosicyopus generally exhibit tan coloration with diffuse dusky markings rather than the more contrasting patterns observed in S. chloe.
