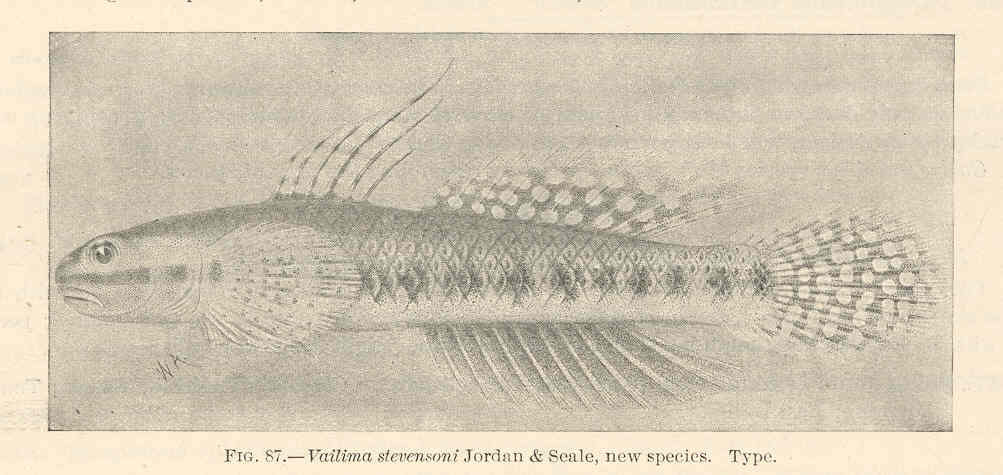

Conservation status
- Least Concern (IUCN 3.1)

Scientific classification
- Kingdom: Animalia
- Phylum: Chordata
- Class: Actinopterygii
- Division: Teleostei
- Order: Gobiiformes
- Family: Oxudercidae
- Genus: Stiphodon
- Species: S. elegans

Binomial name
- Stiphodon elegans (Steindachner, 1879)

Synonyms
- Sicydium elegans (Steindachner, 1879): Vailima stevensoni D.S. Jordan & Seale, 1906; Stiphodon stevensoni (Jordan & Seale, 1906)

= Stiphodon elegans =

Species of fish

Stiphodon elegans, commonly known as the Green Riffle Goby, is a species of freshwater goby. They can live from 3–8 years, but they still remain small throughout their lifespans, only growing to up to 5cm. Their physical appearance is described as small and elongated, with raised, slightly dorsal-set eyes, a pelvic sucker, which is a suction-like fin derived from a fused set of pelvic fins, and a subterminal mouth. Within their mouths, they have many rows of long, thin, sharp, densely packed polyphyodont teeth. They also have modified, hook-like structures on their pharyngeal jaw. The purpose behind this characteristic is not entirely clear, but is possibly correlated with their feeding behavior in their rocky habitats. This species exhibits sexual dimorphism, with males displaying vivid, spotted patterns across their bodies, and longer, more sharper angled fins, while females are covered in wide, horizontal black and cream-colored stripes and have shorter, more rounded fins. Males also change color depending on their breeding status. Males who are not breeding are a grayish, dull green, while actively breeding males turn a dark, almost black color with vibrant green stripes and dots across its entire body, particularly along their lateral line area. Unfortunately, most females in the Stiphodon genus look almost the exact same, making it difficult to identify the species when only females are present. Many different species of Stiphodon have been easily confused with one another, as most were placed under the initial classification of Stiphodon elegans after their discovery. Since the Green Riffle Goby’s first introduction to scientific journals in 1879, the taxonomy of the genus has been updated frequently over the years, particularly in the 1990’s and early 2000’s. This research led to many discoveries of separate, endemic species across the Pacific Ocean, most of which found that many populations of Stiphodon lived nearby one another, but would not interbreed. Trying to classify between each species has proven difficult, as identification characteristics have been mainly based on subtle differences in body measurements and coloration.

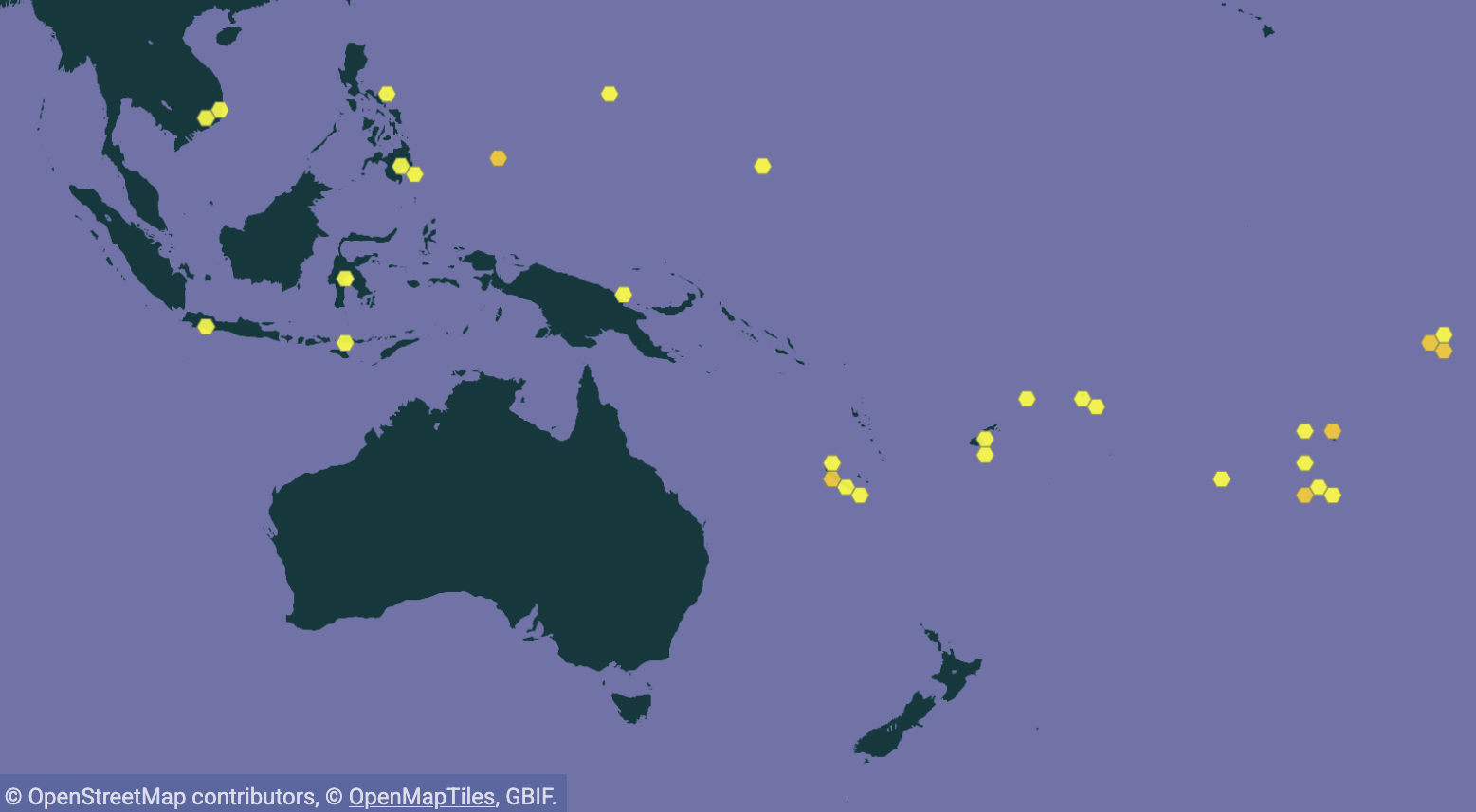
Stiphodon elegans (Steindachner, 1879) - Global Distribution

== Distribution ==
Green Riffle Goby populations are found in tropical areas all across the Pacific Ocean, including Polynesia, the Cook Islands, French Polynesia, Samoa, and the Wallis and Futuna islands. They mainly inhabit the demersal zone of coastal rainforest streams, but can also be found in brackish and marine areas.

== Life History ==
Stiphodon elegans primarily consumes microorganisms as juveniles, and develops a preference for an algae and biofilm based diets as adults. As amphidromous goby, these fish breed in freshwater, and newly hatched larvae drift out into the ocean. Once they mature, they are able to return to freshwater to grow and breed, living in burrows made up from the rocky substrate around them. Based on behavior from other species in the Stiphodon genus, males utilize their bright, flashy colors to attract mates. The Opal Cling Goby (Stiphodon semoni) use their shiny, colorful bodies to court females outside of their burrows by wagging their tails and exhibiting kiss-like behaviors to entice females to breed with them. Because they are the same genus, Stiphodon elegans likely exhibits a similar behavior, although this is a poorly researched subject. Since their freshwater sources are usually restricted to higher up, steep elevations, to access them, they have the ability to climb waterfalls. They are able to climb to them by using their mouth and their pelvic sucker to slowly make their way up cliff faces. However, despite being adapted to nimbly climb these walls, they seem to have trouble with significant angle changes, and can often fail on their trek upwards due to these angles, or simply not having a large enough pelvic fin. Those individuals who successfully scale these cliffs are observed to have larger average pelvic disk diameter compared to those who did not.

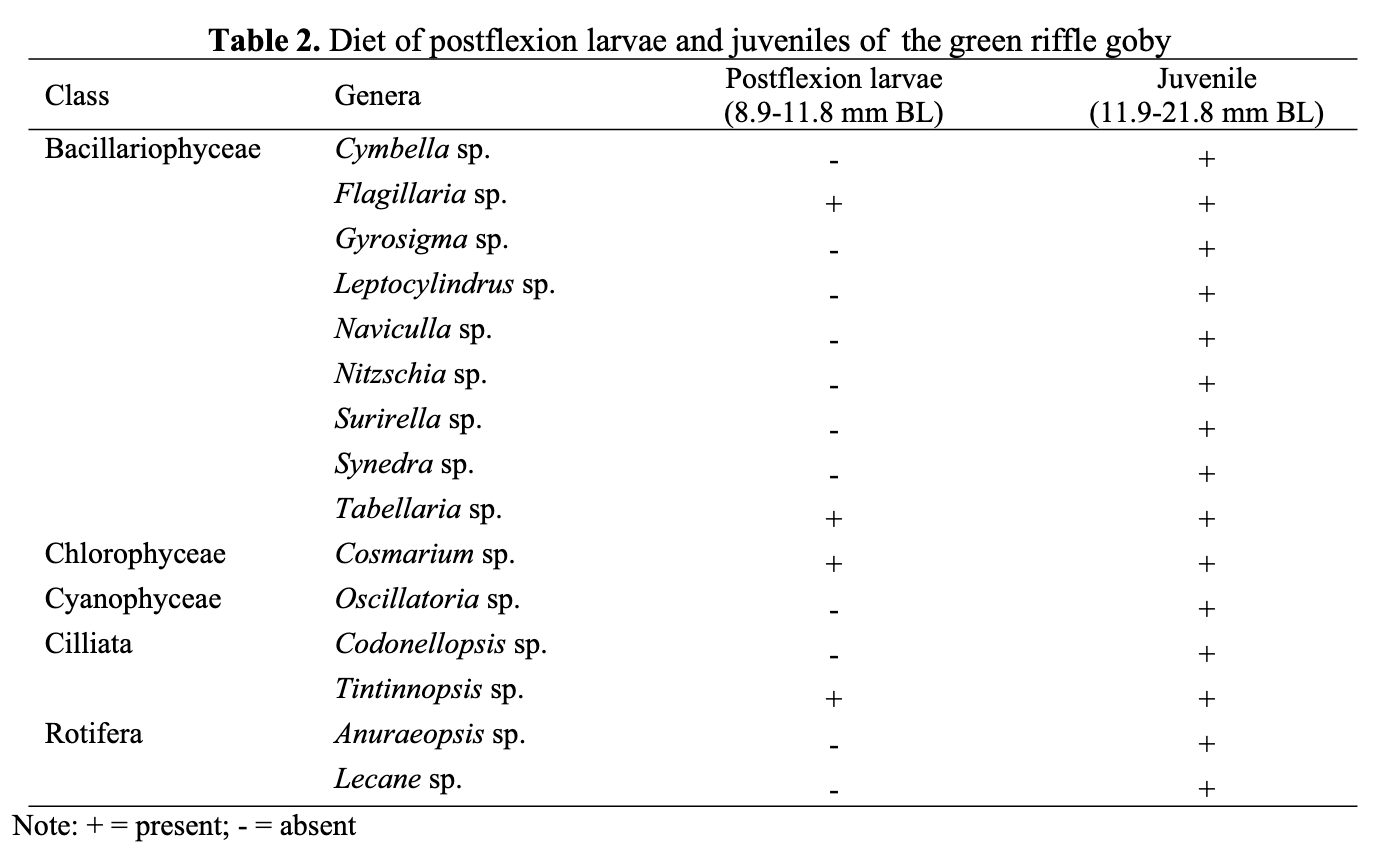
Diet of postflexion larvae and juveniles of the green riffle goby

== Conservation Status ==
The Green Riffle Goby is considered a species of least concern according to the IUCN Red List of Threatened Species. Despite having many somewhat recent discoveries of different Stiphodon species, the entire genus is very understudied. However, they are very popular amongst exotic aquarium collectors due to their bright colors, small size, and algae-based diet, which could help with overall aquarium maintenance. Overharvesting of these individuals could lead to conservation issues in the future, along with unexpected consequences of climate change on their island resources. Rising sea levels could reduce access to freshwater on these islands, leaving them to compete with ocean species that are more well adapted to survive saltwater conditions.

== Sources ==
- Amaliah, S W; Affandi, R; Simanjuntak, C P H; Baihaqi, F; Annida, S B; Prabowo, T; Romdon, A (November 2023). "Diet composition and feeding strategy of larvae and juveniles of green riffle goby, Stiphodon elegans in Cimaja Estuary, Indonesia". IOP Conference Series: Earth and Environmental Science. 1260 (1) 012009. Bibcode:2023E&ES.1260a2009A. doi:10.1088/1755-1315/1260/1/012009.
- Boseto, David; Morrison, Clare; Pikacha, Patrick; Pitakia, Tikai (2007). "Biodiversity and conservation of freshwater fishes in selected rivers on Choiseul Island, Solomon Islands". The South Pacific Journal of Natural and Applied Sciences. 25 (1): 16. doi:10.1071/sp07003.
- Ebner, Brendan C.; Kemp, Darrell J. (4 June 2020). "The boy can dance: ritual courtship of the opal cling goby". Pacific Conservation Biology. 26 (2): 201–203. Bibcode:2020PacSB..26..201E. doi:10.1071/pc19020.
- Gross, Phoebe; Carlson, Stephanie (4 June 2023). "Morphology Influences Climbing Ability of the Adult Tropical Gobiid Stiphodon elegans on Moorea, French Polynesia". Berkeley Scientific Journal. 27 (1). doi:10.5070/BS327161288.
- Kobayashi, Katie (2013). THE EFFECTS OF BARRIERS ON THE CLIMBING ABILITY OF TWO AMPHIDROMOUS GOBIIDS (SICYOPTERUS SPP. AND STIPHODON ELEGANS) ON MOOREA, FRENCH POLYNESIA (PDF) (Report).
- Masuda, H; Amaoka, K; Araga, C; Uyeno, T; Yoshino, T, eds. (1984). The Fishes of the Japanese Archipelago. Vol. 1. Tokyo, Japan: Tokai University Press. ISBN 978-4-486-05054-4. OCLC 11521625.
- Nelson, S.G.; Parham, J.E.; Tibbatts, R.B.; Camacho, F.A.; Leberer, T.; Smith, B.D. (1997). "Distributions and Microhabitats of the Amphidromous Gobies in Streams of Micronesia" (PDF). Micronesica. 30 (1): 83–91.
- Parenti, Lynne R.; Thomas, K. Rebecca (September 1998). "Pharyngeal jaw morphology and homology in Sicydiine Gobies (Teleostei: Gobiidae) and allies". Journal of Morphology. 237 (3): 257–274. doi:10.1002/(SICI)1097-4687(199809)237:3<257::AID-JMOR4>3.0.CO;2-W. PMID 29852680.
- Ryan, Patrick. A (1986). Uyeno, Teruya (ed.). A new species of Stiphodon (Gobiidae: Sicydiaphiinae) from Vanuatu. Indo-Pacific Fish Biology: Proceedings of the Second International Conference on Indo-Pacific Fishes : Conducted at the Tokyo National Museum Ueno Park, Tokyo, July 29–August 3, 1985. Ichthyological Society of Japan. pp. 655–662. ISBN 978-4-930813-12-1.
- Watson, Ronald E (1998). "Stiphodon martenstyni, a new species of freshwater goby from Sri Lanka (Teleostei: Gobiidae: Sicydiini)". Journal of South Asian Natural History. 3 (1): 69–78.
- Watson, Ronald E; Keith, Philippe; Marquet, Gérard (2005). "Stiphodon sapphirinus, a new species of freshwater goby from New Caledonia (Gobioidei: Sicydiinae)" (PDF). Cybium. 29 (4): 339–345.
