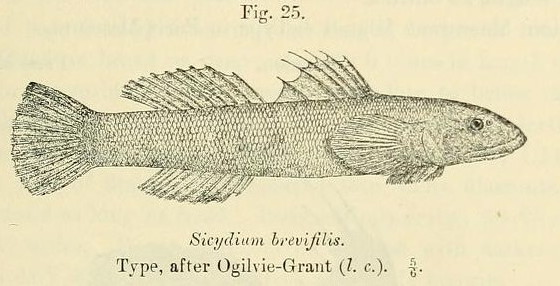

Scientific classification
- Domain: Eukaryota
- Kingdom: Animalia
- Phylum: Chordata
- Class: Actinopterygii
- Order: Gobiiformes
- Family: Oxudercidae
- Genus: Sicydium
- Species: S. brevifile

Binomial name
- Sicydium brevifile Ogilvie-Grant, 1884

= Sicydium brevifile =

Species of fish

Sicydium brevifile is a species of goby from the subfamily Sicydiinae. It is an amphidromous endemic in western Cameroon and the islands of the Gulf of Guinea where the adults inhabit the clearwater streams of the volcanic islands and on the slopes of Mount Cameroon, having ascended from the sea as larvae. Specimens are imported into the Aquarium trade from Cameroon. The specific name means "short thread", Latin brevis and filum, probably a reference to the "small median papilla above the maxillary suture".
