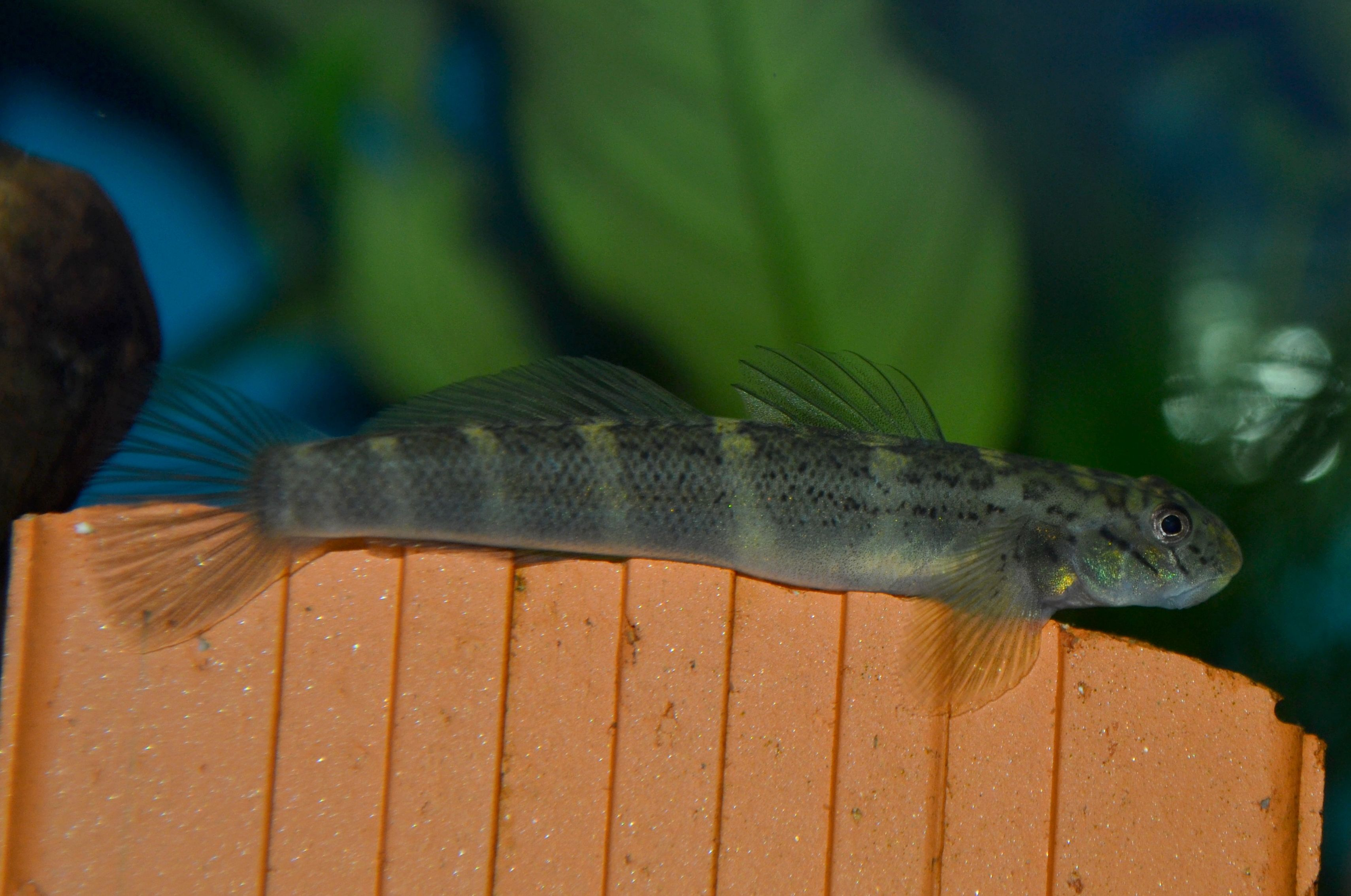

Conservation status
- Least Concern (IUCN 3.1)

Scientific classification
- Kingdom: Animalia
- Phylum: Chordata
- Class: Actinopterygii
- Division: Teleostei
- Order: Gobiiformes
- Family: Oxudercidae
- Subfamily: Sicydiinae
- Genus: Parasicydium; Risch, 1980
- Species: P. bandama

Binomial name
- Parasicydium bandama Risch, 1980

Synonyms
- Lentipes bandama (Risch, 1980)

= Parasicydium =

Species of fish

Parasicydium bandama is a species of goby native to fast-flowing streams and rivers of Cameroon, Congo, Gabon and the Ivory Coast. This species grows to a length of 5.4 centimetres (2.1 in) TL. This species is the only known member of its genus. The genus refers to this species resemblance to members of the genus Sicydium while the specific name is the name of the Bandama River in the Ivory Coast where the type specimen was collected.
