= Clown goby =

Clown goby may refer to:

- Gobiodon, a genus of gobies also known as coral gobies
- Microgobius gulosus, a species of goby native to the Pacific and Atlantic coasts of the Americas
- Sicyopterus griseus, a species of goby endemic to India and Sri Lanka
