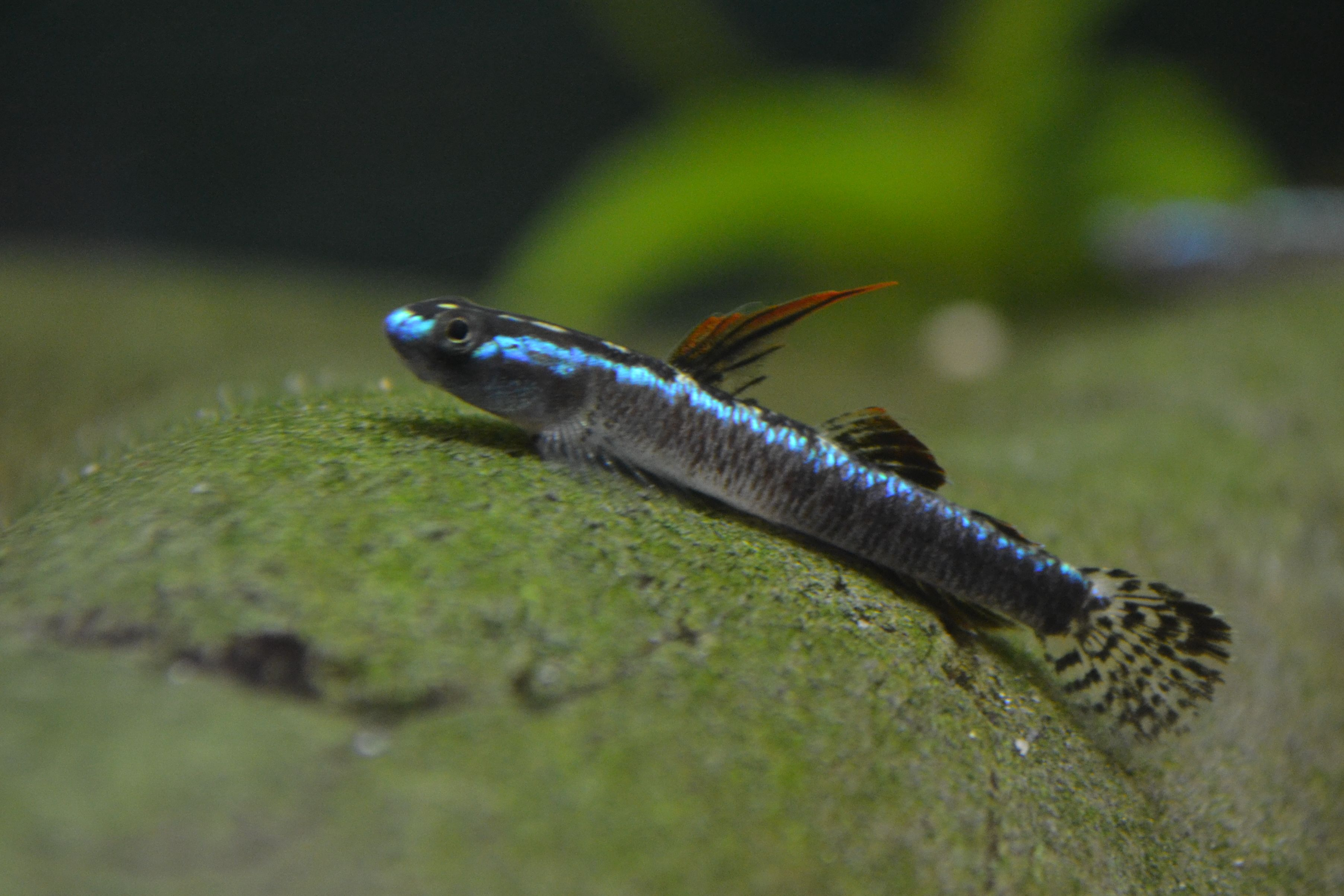
- Stiphodon percnopterygionus
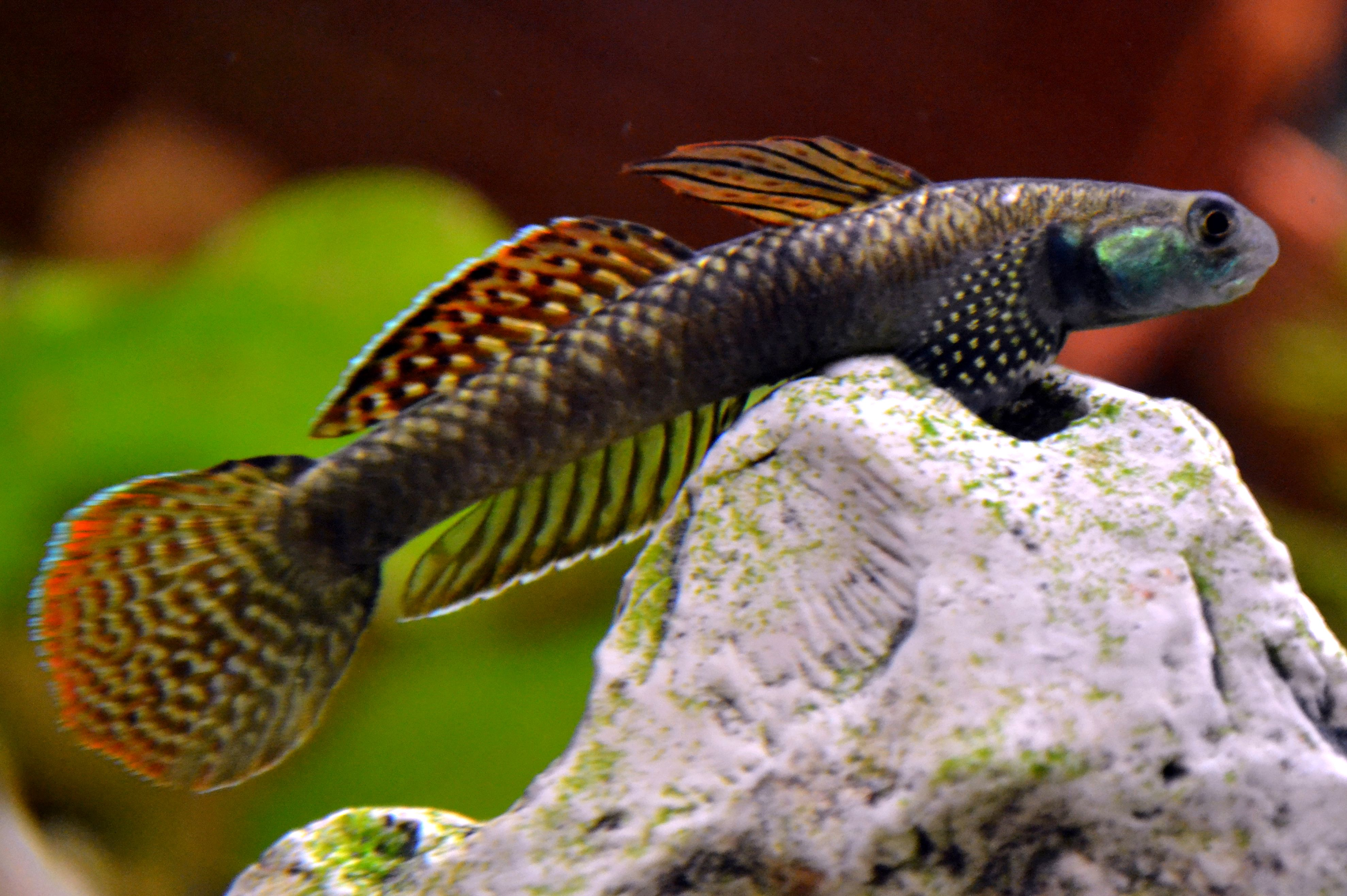
- Stiphodon ornatus

Scientific classification
- Kingdom: Animalia
- Phylum: Chordata
- Class: Actinopterygii
- Division: Teleostei
- Order: Gobiiformes
- Family: Oxudercidae
- Subfamily: Sicydiinae
- Genus: Stiphodon; M. C. W. Weber, 1895

Type species
- Stiphodon semoni M. C. W. Weber, 1895

Synonyms
- Vailima Jordan & Seale, 1906

= Stiphodon =

Genus of fishes

Stiphodon is a genus of freshwater gobies. They inhabit swift, clear streams close to the sea and are found in large parts of Asia and Oceania. Many of the 36 currently recognized species have extremely restricted distributions on single islands or even single streams. These are small gobies with bodies squarish in cross section. A female of Stiphodon multisquamus with a standard length of 60.4mm is the largest Stiphodon individual on record. Males of Stiphodon species are often vividly colored and a few species are occasionally sold in the aquarium trade, including Stiphodon ornatus, Stiphodon atropurpureus, Stiphodon maculidorsalis, Stiphodon semoni, and Stiphodon surrufus.

== Species ==
There are currently 38 recognized species in this genus:

- Stiphodon alcedo Maeda, Mukai & Tachihara, 2012 – Described from Okinawa and Iriomote in the Ryukyu Islands, Japan, but these may be vagrant populations transported to Japan via the Kuroshio Current (similar to Stiphodon surrufus), and the species may actually be endemic to and present in larger numbers in the Philippines
- Stiphodon allen R. E. Watson, 1996 (Allen's stiphodon) – Endemic to Queensland, Australia
- Stiphodon annieae Keith & Hadiaty, 2015 – Endemic to Indonesia
- Stiphodon astilbos P. A. Ryan, 1986 – Endemic to Vanuatu
- Stiphodon atratus R. E. Watson, 1996 (Black stiphodon) – Native to Indonesia, Papua New Guinea, the Admiralty Islands, Bismarck Archipelago, Bougainville, Vanuatu, and New Caledonia
- Stiphodon atropurpureus (Herre, 1927) (Blue neon goby) – Probably endemic to the Philippines, but possible vagrant populations or misidentified specimens have also been recorded from Japan, Taiwan, southern China, and southern Malaysia. Often confused with the very similar Stiphodon semoni, though their native ranges do not overlap. Many other similar-looking species of Stiphodon are also mislabeled as S. atropurpureus in the aquarium trade.
- Stiphodon aureofuscus Keith, Busson, S. Sauri, Hubert & Hadiaty, 2015 – Endemic to Indonesia (Java, Bali, and Lombok)
- Stiphodon aureorostrum Chen & Tan, 2005 – Endemic to Malaysia
- Stiphodon birdsong R. E. Watson, 1996 – Native to Indonesia and Papua New Guinea, from Halmahera to the northern coastline of Papua New Guinea
- Stiphodon caeruleus Parenti & Maciolek, 1993 – Endemic to Pohnpei, Caroline Islands, Micronesia
- Stiphodon carisa R. E. Watson, 2008 (Lampung hillstream goby) – Endemic to Sumatra, Indonesia
- Stiphodon chlorestes
- Stiphodon discotorquatus R. E. Watson, 1995 – Endemic to French Polynesia
- Stiphodon elegans (Steindachner, 1879) – Native to Polynesia, including Wallis and Futuna, Samoa, the Cook Islands, and French Polynesia. It was previously recorded with a wider geographic distribution, but this needs to be verified as they are likely to be other misidentified species.
- Stiphodon hadiatyae N. Nurjirana, R. Gustiano, H. Haryono & K. Wibowo, 2025 – Endemic to Enggano Island
- Stiphodon hydroreibatus R. E. Watson, 1999 – Native to the Samoan Islands and Futuna
- Stiphodon imperiorientis R. E. Watson & I. S. Chen, 1998 – Native to southern Japan, southern China, and probably eastern Taiwan
- Stiphodon julieni Keith, R. E. Watson & Marquet, 2002 – Endemic to Rapa Iti in French Polynesia
- Stiphodon kalfatak Keith, Marquet & R. E. Watson, 2007 (Kalfatak's stiphodon) – Endemic to Santo Island, Vanuatu
- Stiphodon larson R. E. Watson, 1996 – Endemic to Papua New Guinea
- Stiphodon maculidorsalis Maeda & H. H. Tan, 2013 (Orange-fin stiphodon) – Endemic to West Sumatra, Indonesia
- Stiphodon martenstyni R. E. Watson, 1998 (Martenstyn's stiphodon) – Endemic to southwestern Sri Lanka
- Stiphodon mele Keith, Marquet & Pouilly, 2009 (Mele's stiphodon) – Native to Vanuatu and New Caledonia
- Stiphodon multisquamus H. L. Wu & Y. Ni, 1986 – Native to Hainan, southern China, and Japan
- Stiphodon niraikanaiensis Maeda, 2013 – Endemic to Japan
- Stiphodon oatea Keith, Feunteun & Vigneux, 2010 – Native to French Polynesia and the Marquesas
- Stiphodon ornatus Meinken, 1974 (Rainbow stiphodon) – Endemic to Aceh and West Sumatra in Sumatra, Indonesia
- Stiphodon palawanensis Maeda & Palla, 2015 – Endemic to Palawan, Philippines
- Stiphodon pelewensis Herre, 1936 – Native to Palau, but might also be found throughout the Mariana Islands to as far as Pohnpei
- Stiphodon percnopterygionus R. E. Watson & I. S. Chen, 1998 – Native to the Ryukyu Islands of Japan, Taiwan, Guam in the Mariana Islands, and Babelthuap in Palau
- Stiphodon pulchellus (Herre, 1927) – Endemic to the Philippines
- Stiphodon rubromaculatus Keith & Marquet, 2007 – Endemic to Futuna
- Stiphodon rutilaureus R. E. Watson, 1996 (Golden-red stiphodon) – Native to Papua New Guinea, the Solomon Islands, the Bismarck Archipelago, Vanuatu, New Caledonia, and Fiji
- Stiphodon sapphirinus R. E. Watson, Keith & Marquet, 2005 (Sapphire stiphodon) – Native to New Caledonia and Vanuatu
- Stiphodon semoni M. C. W. Weber, 1895 (Cobalt blue goby) – Native from the Maluku Islands of Indonesia to Papua New Guinea, the Solomon Islands, and New Caledonia. Often confused with the very similar Stiphodon atropurpureus, though their native ranges do not overlap.
- Stiphodon surrufus R. E. Watson & Kottelat, 1995 – Endemic to Lagu Lagu Creek in Leyte in the Philippines, but vagrant populations have also been reported in low abundance in Japan, probably transported via the Kuroshio Current
- Stiphodon tuivi R. E. Watson, 1995 – Native to the Marquesas and French Polynesia
- Stiphodon weberi R. E. Watson, G. R. Allen & Kottelat, 1998 – Endemic to Ambon and Halmahera in the Maluku Islands and Yapen in Irian Jaya, Indonesia
- Stiphodon zebrinus R. E. Watson, G. R. Allen & Kottelat, 1998 – Endemic to Halmahera, Indonesia
