= Lentipes =

Scientific classification
- Kingdom: Animalia
- Phylum: Chordata
- Class: Actinopterygii
- Order: Gobiiformes
- Family: Oxudercidae
- Subfamily: Sicydiinae
- Genus: Lentipes; Günther, 1861

Type species
- Sicyogaster concolor T. N. Gill, 1860

Synonyms
- Raogobius Mukerji, 1935; Sicyogaster Gill, 1860 (name preocuppied)

Genus of fishes

Lentipes is a genus of gobies in the family Oxudercidae, native to fresh, marine and brackish waters of the Malay Archipelago and islands in the Pacific. Its species are typically from fast-flowing streams and some are anadromous.

== Species ==
There are currently 23 recognized species in this genus:

- Lentipes adelphizonus R. E. Watson & Kottelat, 2006
- Lentipes argenteus Keith, Hadiaty & Lord, 2014
- Lentipes andamanicus Mukerji, 1935
- Lentipes armatus H. Sakai & M. Nakamura, 1979
- Lentipes bunagaya Maeda & Kobayashi, 2021
- Lentipes caroline D. B. Lynch, Keith & Pezold, 2013
- Lentipes concolor (T. N. Gill, 1860)
- Lentipes crittersius R. E. Watson & G. R. Allen, 1999
- Lentipes dimetrodon R. E. Watson & G. R. Allen, 1999
- Lentipes ikeae Keith, Hubert, Busson & Hadiaty, 2014
- Lentipes kaaea R. E. Watson, Keith & Marquet, 2002
- Lentipes kijimuna Maeda & Kobayashi, 2021
- Lentipes kolobangara Keith, Lord, Boseto & Ebner, 2016
- Lentipes mekonggaensis Keith & Hadiaty, 2014
- Lentipes mindanaoensis I. S. Chen, 2004
- Lentipes multiradiatus G. R. Allen, 2001
- Lentipes niasensis Harefa & Chen, 2022
- Lentipes palawanirufus Maeda & Palla, 2021
- Lentipes ptasan Jhuang, Nañola, Li & Liao, 2025
- Lentipes rubrofasciatus Maugé, Marquet & Laboute, 1992
- Lentipes solomonensis A. P. Jenkins, G. R. Allen & Boseto, 2008
- Lentipes venustus G. R. Allen, 2004
- Lentipes watsoni G. R. Allen, 1997
- Lentipes whittenorum R. E. Watson & Kottelat, 1994
