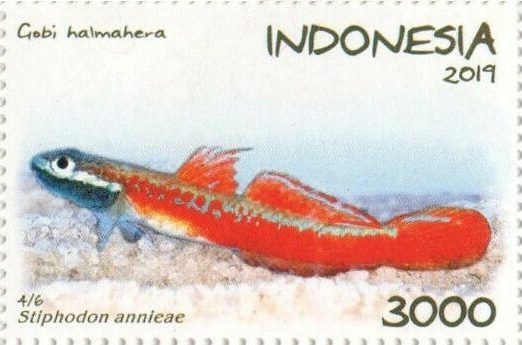

Scientific classification
- Domain: Eukaryota
- Kingdom: Animalia
- Phylum: Chordata
- Class: Actinopterygii
- Order: Gobiiformes
- Family: Oxudercidae
- Genus: Stiphodon
- Species: S. annieae

Binomial name
- Stiphodon annieae Keith & Hadiaty, 2015

= Stiphodon annieae =

Species of freshwater fish

Stiphodon annieae is a freshwater goby only occurring in Halmahera, Indonesia.

Like other Sicydiinae, Stiphodon annieae is found in clear, high gradient streams with rocky bottoms. It lives on the bottom of the river, on top of rocks. It is assumed to be amphidromous. The males of this species can reach a length of 2.3 cm (0.91 in).
