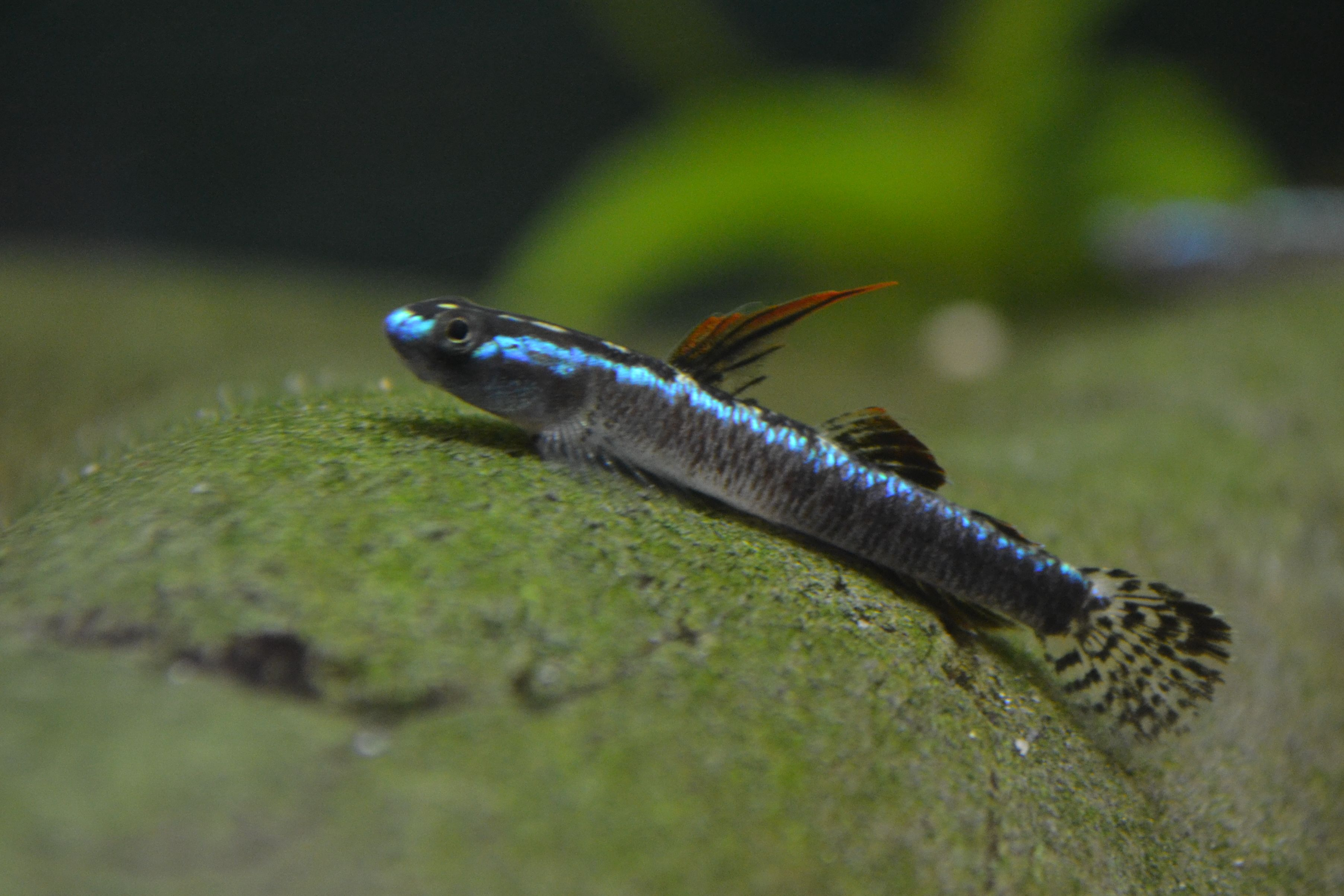

Scientific classification
- Kingdom: Animalia
- Phylum: Chordata
- Class: Actinopterygii
- Order: Gobiiformes
- Family: Oxudercidae
- Genus: Stiphodon
- Species: S. percnopterygionus

Binomial name
- Stiphodon percnopterygionus R. E. Watson & I. S. Chen, 1998

= Stiphodon percnopterygionus =

Species of fish

Stiphodon percnopterygionus is a species of goby found in the Pacific Ocean on the Asian side from the Ryukyu Islands and Taiwan in Asia out to Guam, the Mariana Islands and Babelthuap, Palau in the south Pacific. This species can reach a length of 3.7 centimetres (1.5 in) SL.
