= Stiphodon tuivi =

Scientific classification
- Domain: Eukaryota
- Kingdom: Animalia
- Phylum: Chordata
- Class: Actinopterygii
- Order: Gobiiformes
- Family: Oxudercidae
- Genus: Stiphodon
- Species: S. tuivi

Binomial name
- Stiphodon tuivi Watson, 1995

Species of fish

Stiphodon tuivi is a species of goby found on the Marquesan Islands in French Polynesia. This species can reach a length of 3.2 centimetres (1.3 in) SL.
