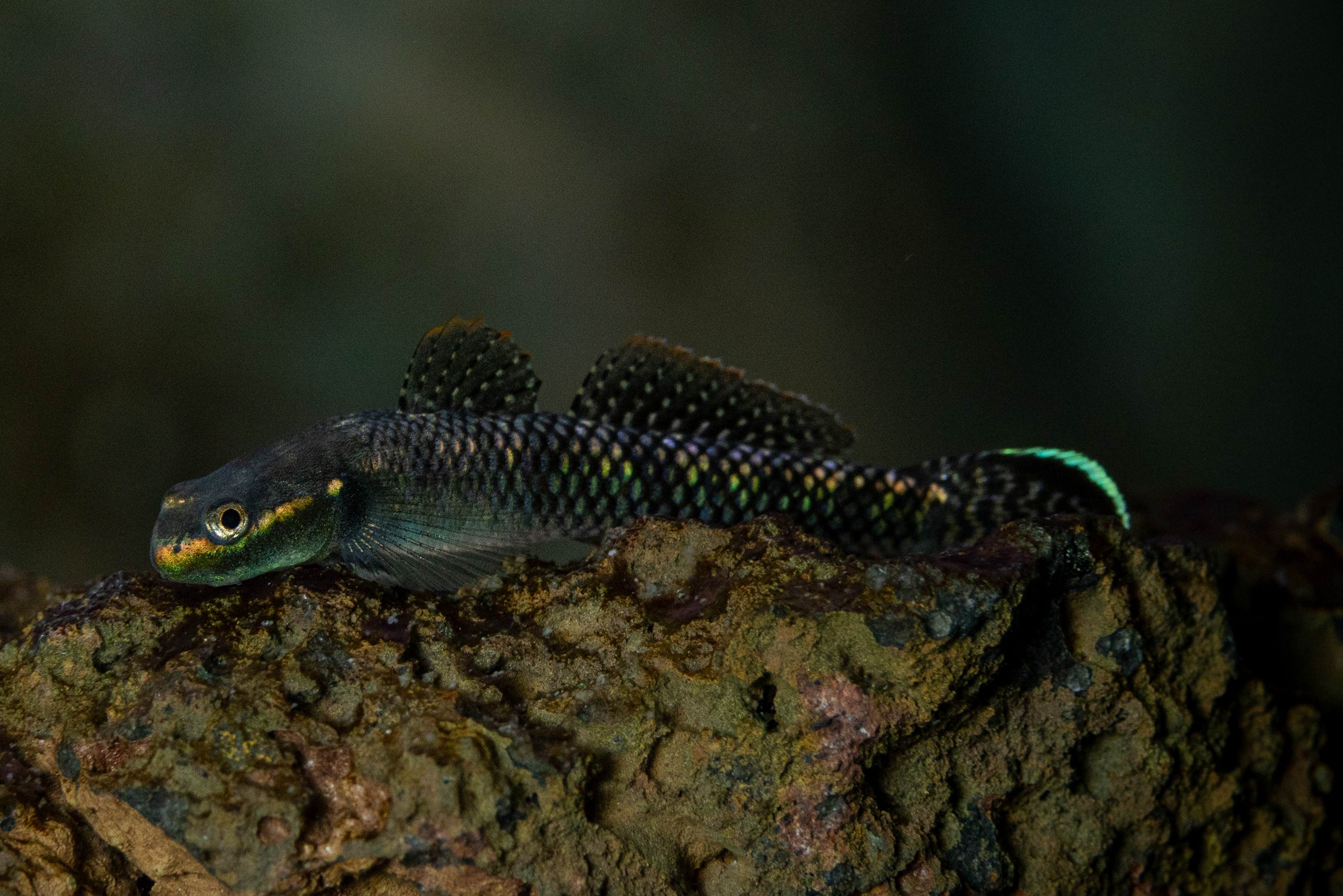

Conservation status
- Least Concern (IUCN 3.1)

Scientific classification
- Kingdom: Animalia
- Phylum: Chordata
- Class: Actinopterygii
- Order: Gobiiformes
- Family: Oxudercidae
- Genus: Stiphodon
- Species: S. atropurpureus

Binomial name
- Stiphodon atropurpureus Herre, 1927

= Stiphodon atropurpureus =

Genus of fish

Stiphodon atropurpureus, commonly referred to as the Philippine neon goby or blue neon dwarf goby, is a ray-finned fish of the Gobiidae family. It is native to parts of Asia, including the Philippines, China, Japan, Vietnam and Indonesia.

== Description ==
S. atropurpureus has a fusiform body. It measures between 20 and 50 millimeters in length. Its two dorsal fins have seven spines in the front and nine soft dorsal spines in the back. The visual characteristics are similar to other Stiphodon species with which it shares habitat, making identification difficult without detailed anatomical study or genetic testing.

Males feature a spectrum of metallic lustre, whose colouration ranges from green to blue to purple. This iridescence is most noticeable during mating displays or territorial behaviour. The male's first dorsal fin lacks elongation and a fibrous texture, but features a distinctive narrow red border, enhancing its visual appeal to other fish and playing a critical role during social interactions.

Females are paler in colouration compared to the males, typically white or pastel, with two clear transverse lines and exhibiting sexual dimorphism. This appearance is believed to cloud their visibility, thereby reducing predation risks.

Juveniles start with muted colouration, gradually developing the vibrant hues seen in adults. This progression is especially pronounced in males, where adult colouration has a role in social behaviour and reproductive success.

== Distribution and habitat ==
S. atropurpureus is found in a variety of locations across Asia, including the Philippines, China, Japan, Vietnam and Indonesia. These gobies prefer the clear and oxygen-rich waters of faster streams, which provide not only the necessary environmental conditions for their survival, but also the substrates essential for their feeding habits. Despite the broad geographic range, the specific details of their population dynamics are not well-documented. The challenges posed by their small size and elusive nature make comprehensive population studies difficult. Research efforts are generally localized, focusing on small-scale stream surveys, which do not provide a complete picture of their overall distribution.

S. atropurpureus coexists with other species within the Stiphodon genus, which share similar habitats and ecological niches.

== Reproductive behavior and life cycle ==
S. atropurpureus undergoes a complex life cycle that is amphidromous (including migration from fresh water to the sea, or vice versa, but not for the purpose of breeding). Adults breed in freshwater environments, where they lay their eggs. After hatching, the larvae drift downstream to the marine environment, living planktonically. The larvae eventual reach the sea, distancing themselves from freshwater predators. Post-larvae gobies return to freshwater areas using fused pelvic fins that form a suction disc to cling to rocks and swim against the stream currents. This amphidromous life cycle is essential for maintaining the population's genetic diversity and resilience.

== Feeding ==
S. atropurpureus fish primarily feed on algae and biofilms, which they scrape from rocks using their subterminal mouths. This diet is rich in nutrients and the availability of food sources is impacted by the water quality in the surrounding environment.

== Conservation ==
Growing popularity of S. atropurpureus in the aquarium trade has raised popular awareness of the species, though has also led to increased harvesting from the wild (since there is currently no dedicated aquaculture for breeding S. atropurpureus, all individuals in the aquarium trade are collected from the wild.) This practice puts more pressure on natural populations and can deplete local stocks. In a similar vein, over-depletion of the population for the aquarium industry has complicated research on their abundance and distribution, as well as efforts to accurately observe the species' behaviour.

The species is dependent on clean water sources and the ability for unimpeded migration between freshwater and marine habitats. Populations are therefore vulnerable to human-induced damage such as dam construction, water pollution and diversion and climate change. In sum, the species' high sensitivity to water quality and its inability to breed in polluted waters results in an increased risk to growth for populations in contaminated streams.

S. atropurpureus is categorized as Least Concern (LC) by the IUCN.
