= Cotylopus =

Scientific classification
- Kingdom: Animalia
- Phylum: Chordata
- Class: Actinopterygii
- Order: Gobiiformes
- Family: Oxudercidae
- Subfamily: Sicydiinae
- Genus: Cotylopus; Guichenot, 1863

Type species
- Cotylopus acutipinnis Guichenot, 1863

Genus of fishes

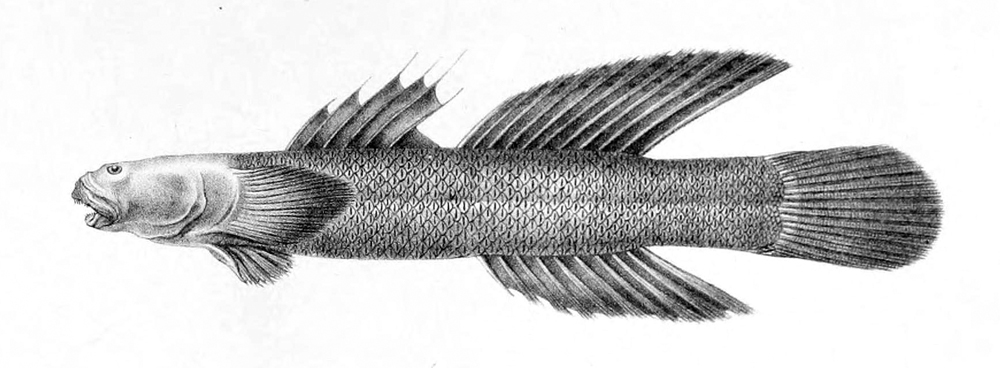
Cotylopus

Cotylopus is a genus of gobies native to streams and rivers in Mauritius, Réunion, Mayotte, and Anjouan in the Comoros, which are all islands in the Western Indian Ocean off Africa.

== Species ==
The recognized species in this genus are:

- Cotylopus acutipinnis Guichenot, 1863
- Cotylopus rubripinnis Keith, Hoareau & P. Bosc, 2005
