= Stiphodon multisquamus =

Scientific classification
- Kingdom: Animalia
- Phylum: Chordata
- Class: Actinopterygii
- Order: Gobiiformes
- Family: Oxudercidae
- Genus: Stiphodon
- Species: S. multisquamus

Binomial name
- Stiphodon multisquamus H. L. Wu & Y. Ni, 1986

Synonyms
- Stiphodon aureorostrum Chen & Tan, 2005

Species of fish

Stiphodon multisquamus is a species of amphidromous freshwater goby found in Da Nang, Guangdong, southern Hainan, Okinawa Island and Pulau Tioman. This species can reach a length of 6.4 centimetres (2.5 in) SL represent the largest known members of the genus.

Colour of live males variable. Body and fin markings similar to those of preserved specimens, but background yellowish grey to purplish; lateral sides of head yellowish grey to grey, often bluish. The female is more sombrely marked and is less easy to identify.
