= Stiphodon imperiorientis =

Scientific classification
- Kingdom: Animalia
- Phylum: Chordata
- Class: Actinopterygii
- Order: Gobiiformes
- Family: Oxudercidae
- Genus: Stiphodon
- Species: S. imperiorientis

Binomial name
- Stiphodon imperiorientis R. E. Watson & I. S. Chen, 1998

Species of fish

Stiphodon imperiorientis is a species of goby found on the southern Japan islands and in the mainland of South China. This species can reach a length of 5.0 centimetres (2.0 in) SL.
