= Stiphodon allen =

Scientific classification
- Domain: Eukaryota
- Kingdom: Animalia
- Phylum: Chordata
- Class: Actinopterygii
- Order: Gobiiformes
- Family: Oxudercidae
- Genus: Stiphodon
- Species: S. allen

Binomial name
- Stiphodon allen Watson, 1996

Species of fish

Stiphodon allen, or Allen's stiphodon, is a species of goby known only from Queensland, Australia. This species can reach a length of 5.0 centimetres (2.0 in) SL.
