= Stiphodon carisa =

Scientific classification
- Domain: Eukaryota
- Kingdom: Animalia
- Phylum: Chordata
- Class: Actinopterygii
- Order: Gobiiformes
- Family: Oxudercidae
- Genus: Stiphodon
- Species: S. carisa

Binomial name
- Stiphodon carisa Watson, 2008

Species of fish

Stiphodon carisa, the Lampung hill-stream goby is a species of goby found on Sumatra, Indonesia. This species can reach a length of 3.7 centimetres (1.5 in) SL.
