= Sicyopterus squamosissimus =

Scientific classification
- Domain: Eukaryota
- Kingdom: Animalia
- Phylum: Chordata
- Class: Actinopterygii
- Order: Gobiiformes
- Family: Oxudercidae
- Genus: Sicyopterus
- Species: S. squamosissimus

Binomial name
- Sicyopterus squamosissimus Keith, Lord, Busson, Sauri, Hubert & Hadiaty, 2015

Species of fish

Sicyopterus squamosissimus is a species of fish in the goby family Oxudercidae. It is found off the islands of Sumatra and Java in Indonesia.

== Description ==
Sicyopterus squamosissimus can reach a standard length of 5.1 centimetres (2.0 in).
