= Sicyopus auxilimentus =

Conservation status
- Data Deficient (IUCN 3.1)

Scientific classification
- Kingdom: Animalia
- Phylum: Chordata
- Class: Actinopterygii
- Order: Gobiiformes
- Family: Oxudercidae
- Genus: Sicyopus
- Species: S. auxilimentus

Binomial name
- Sicyopus auxilimentus Watson & Kottelat, 1994

Species of fish

Sicyopus auxilimentus is a species of goby endemic to the Philippines where it is only known to occur in Lagu Lagu Creek on Leyte Island. This species can reach a length of 2.9 centimetres (1.1 in) SL.
