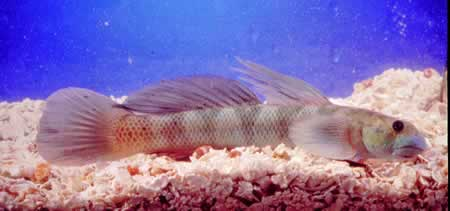

Conservation status
- Data Deficient (IUCN 3.1)

Scientific classification
- Domain: Eukaryota
- Kingdom: Animalia
- Phylum: Chordata
- Class: Actinopterygii
- Order: Gobiiformes
- Family: Oxudercidae
- Genus: Sicydium
- Species: S. plumieri

Binomial name
- Sicydium plumieri (Bloch, 1786)

Synonyms
- Gobius pluemieri Bloch, 1786; Gobius plumieri Bloch, 1786; Sicydium siragus Poey, 1860; Sicydium antillarum Ogilvie-Grant, 1884; Sicydium vincente D. S. Jordan & Evermann, 1898; Sicydium caguitae Evermann & M. C. Marsh, 1899

= Sicydium plumieri =

Species of fish

Sicydium plumieri (Spanish vernacular: Olivo, Cetí; English vernacular: Sirajo Goby) is a freshwater species of the goby native to the Antilles from Cuba to Trinidad and Tobago, though not recorded from all islands. This species can reach a length of 11 centimetres (4.3 in) TL. It is also known by the English common names sirajo, Plumier's stone-biting goby, and tri-tri goby. The young, which are regarded as a delicacy, are of commercial importance. The specific name honours Charles Plumier (1646-1704), a Franciscan friar and naturalist, who found the first specimens of the species on Martinique and Marcus Elieser Bloch based his species description on Plumier's drawings.
