= Stiphodon weberi =

Scientific classification
- Domain: Eukaryota
- Kingdom: Animalia
- Phylum: Chordata
- Class: Actinopterygii
- Order: Gobiiformes
- Family: Oxudercidae
- Genus: Stiphodon
- Species: S. weberi

Binomial name
- Stiphodon weberi Watson, G. R. Allen & Kottelat, 1998

Species of fish

Stiphodon weberi is a species of goby known only from known from Ambon and Halmahera, Maluku and Yapen Island, Irian Jaya, Indonesia. This species can reach a length of 4.3 centimetres (1.7 in) SL.
