= Stiphodon birdsong =

Scientific classification
- Domain: Eukaryota
- Kingdom: Animalia
- Phylum: Chordata
- Class: Actinopterygii
- Order: Gobiiformes
- Family: Oxudercidae
- Genus: Stiphodon
- Species: S. birdsong

Binomial name
- Stiphodon birdsong Watson, 1996

Species of fish

Stiphodon birdsong is a species of goby found on the Indonesia islands and Papua New Guinea. This species can reach a length of 2.3 centimetres (0.91 in) SL.
