= Lentipes whittenorum =

Conservation status
- Data Deficient (IUCN 3.1)

Scientific classification
- Kingdom: Animalia
- Phylum: Chordata
- Class: Actinopterygii
- Order: Gobiiformes
- Family: Oxudercidae
- Genus: Lentipes
- Species: L. whittenorum

Binomial name
- Lentipes whittenorum Watson & Kottelat, 1994

Species of fish

Lentipes whittenorum is a species of goby endemic to marine, brackish and fresh waters of Indonesia. The specific name jointly honours the biologists Anthony (Tony) and Jane Whitten, who assisted the describer Kottelat in a number projects in Indonesia, particularly in the survey of Bali, an island on which this goby occurs.
