= Stiphodon atratus =

Scientific classification
- Domain: Eukaryota
- Kingdom: Animalia
- Phylum: Chordata
- Class: Actinopterygii
- Order: Gobiiformes
- Family: Oxudercidae
- Genus: Stiphodon
- Species: S. atratus

Binomial name
- Stiphodon atratus Watson, 1996

Species of fish

Stiphodon atratus, the black stiphodon, is a species of goby found on in Indonesia, along the northern coast of New Guinea, in the Admiralty Islands, by Halmahera Island, the Bismark Archipelago, around Bougainville, Vanuatu and New Caledonia. This species can reach a length of 6.0 centimetres (2.4 in) SL.
