= Stiphodon hydoreibatus =

Conservation status
- Data Deficient (IUCN 3.1)

Scientific classification
- Kingdom: Animalia
- Phylum: Chordata
- Class: Actinopterygii
- Order: Gobiiformes
- Family: Oxudercidae
- Genus: Stiphodon
- Species: S. hydoreibatus

Binomial name
- Stiphodon hydoreibatus Watson, 1999

Species of fish

Stiphodon hydoreibatus is a species of goby found on the Samoa archipelago and Futuna. This species can reach a length of 3.0 centimetres (1.2 in) SL.
