= Sicyopterus ocellaris =

Conservation status
- Vulnerable (IUCN 3.1)

Scientific classification
- Kingdom: Animalia
- Phylum: Chordata
- Class: Actinopterygii
- Order: Gobiiformes
- Family: Oxudercidae
- Genus: Sicyopterus
- Species: S. ocellaris

Binomial name
- Sicyopterus ocellaris Keith, G. R. Allen & Lord, 2012

Species of fish

Sicyopterus ocellaris is a species of goby in the family Oxudercidae, or alternatively, Gobiidae. It is known from its type locality, the Nuru River in north-eastern New Guinea (Papua New Guinea), and from the Cyclops Coast near Jayapura in Western New Guinea (Indonesia).

== Description ==
Sicyopterus ocellaris can reach a standard length of 4.1 centimetres (1.6 in).
