= Maeken Trance Project =

- Origin: Japan
- Genres: Pop, trance
- Members: Ken Maeda
- Website: jvcmusic.co.jp/maekentrance

Maeken Trance Project (まえけん♂トランス・プロジェクト) is project group of Japanese comedian Ken Maeda best known for trance rendition of O-Zone hit Dragostea Din Tei.

== Discography ==
=== Singles ===
- Koi no Buchiage Tengoku (恋のブチアゲ♂天国) (August 2005)
- Tokyo-Charance (東京チャランス) (August 2006)

=== Compilations ===
- Center Guy Presents Buchiage Trance (センターGUY・プレゼンツ・ブチアゲ♂トランス) (July 2004)
- Seifuku-Rave Presents Buchiage Trance 2 (制服レイヴ・プレゼンツ・ブチアゲ♂トランス 2) (March 2005)
- Buchiage♂Trance #3 (ブチアゲ♂トランス #3) (September 2005)
- Buchiage Trance 4 (March 2006)
- Buchiage♂Trance Presents Galsa Trance (ブチアゲ♂トランス・プレゼンツ・ギャルサートランス) (August 2006)
- Buchiage♂Trance #6 (ブチアゲ♂トランス #6) (March 2007)
- Buchiage♂Trance #7 (ブチアゲ♂トランス #7) (March 2008)
- Buchiage♂Trance #8 (ブチアゲ♂トランス #8) (September 2008)
- Buchiage♂Trance #9 (ブチアゲ♂トランス #9) (March 2009)
- Buchiage♂Trance #10 (ブチアゲ♂トランス #10) (September 2009)
- Buchiage♂Trance #11 (ブチアゲ♂トランス #11) (September 2010)
