= Tattooed-face goby =

Scientific classification
- Kingdom: Animalia
- Phylum: Chordata
- Class: Actinopterygii
- Order: Gobiiformes
- Family: Oxudercidae
- Genus: Lentipes
- Species: L. ptasan

Binomial name
- Lentipes ptasan Jhuang, Nañola, Li & Liao, 2025

Species of fish

The tattooed-face goby (Lentipes ptasan) is a species of goby found in Taiwan and the island of Mindanao in the Philippines.

== Etymology ==
The specific name ptasan is derived from the Truku language (an indigenous tribe in Taiwan), meaning ‘facial tattoo’ which comes from the dark facial lines on the species.

== Description ==
Lentipes ptasan experience sexual dichromatism, with males having highly varied colors. They're usually grey with a broad dark-brown band between bases of second dorsal and anal fins, with blue or white snouts and two black lines running from the eye through the nostrils and ending at the snout. There are three to six silvery patches along the back from the head to the base of the tail.

Females of the species have a silvery-grey body with brown with worm-like markings on the head and front of the body. A black stripe runs from behind the gill cover to the base of the tail. The belly area has silvery spots. An orange mark extends from the anus along the lower body, and the eye has a black ring with a reddish-brown iris.

== Distribution ==
Lentipes ptasan is known from Shimen Stream in Yilan, Taiwan and Bocay-el Falls in Sarangani, Mindanao.
