= Sicyopterus lengguru =

Conservation status
- Data Deficient (IUCN 3.1)

Scientific classification
- Kingdom: Animalia
- Phylum: Chordata
- Class: Actinopterygii
- Order: Gobiiformes
- Family: Oxudercidae
- Genus: Sicyopterus
- Species: S. lengguru

Binomial name
- Sicyopterus lengguru Keith, Lord & Hadiaty, 2012
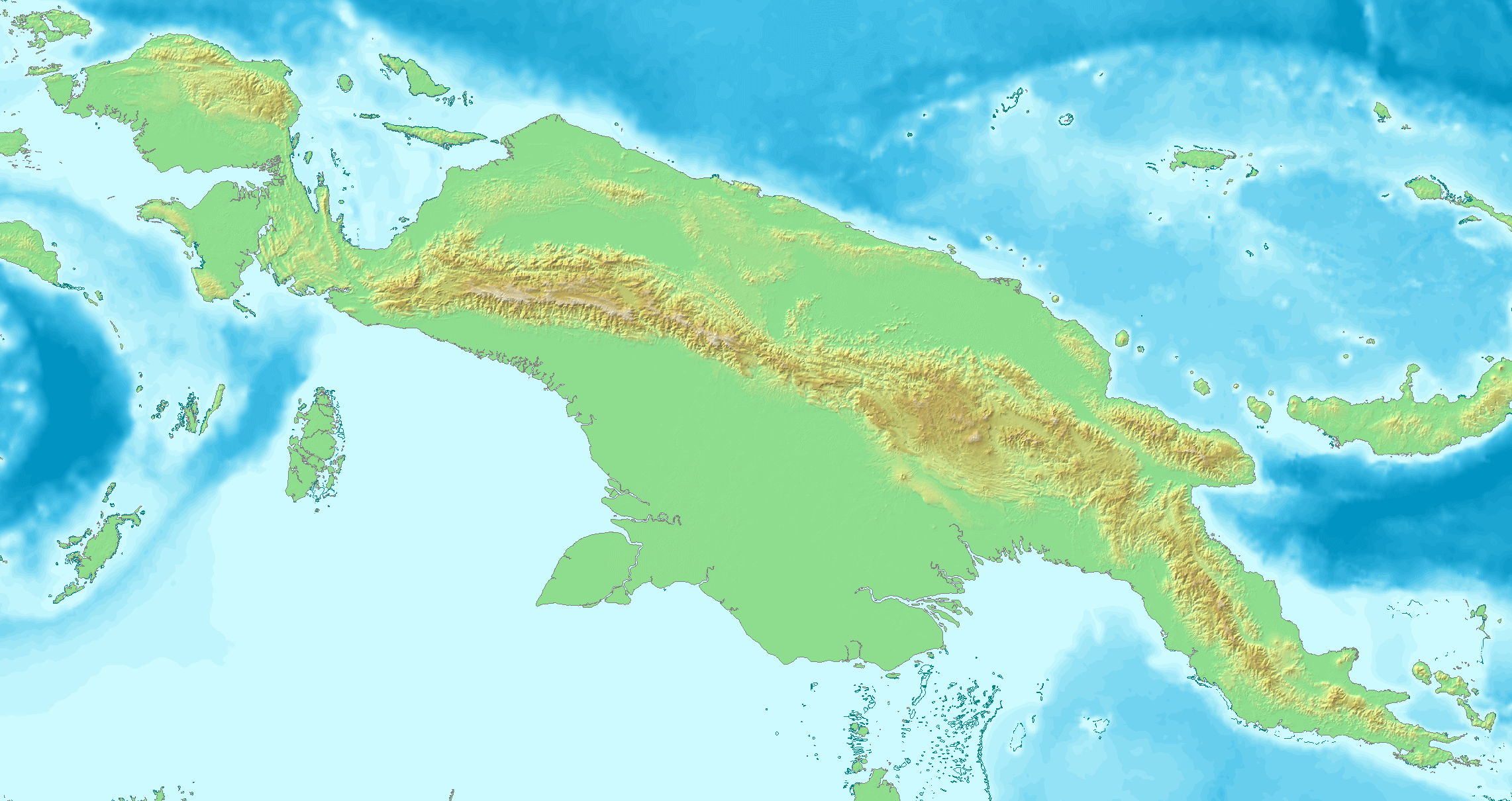
- Sicyopterus lengguru is only known from Bichain River in Western New Guinea (Indonesia)

Species of fish

Sicyopterus lengguru is a species of goby in the family Oxudercidae, or alternatively, Gobiidae. It is only known from Bichain River, near Triton Bay in Western New Guinea.

== Description ==
Sicyopterus lengguru can reach a standard length of 9.0 centimetres (3.5 in).
