= Sicyopterus stiphodonoides =

Conservation status
- Least Concern (IUCN 3.1)

Scientific classification
- Kingdom: Animalia
- Phylum: Chordata
- Class: Actinopterygii
- Order: Gobiiformes
- Family: Oxudercidae
- Genus: Sicyopterus
- Species: S. stiphodonoides

Binomial name
- Sicyopterus stiphodonoides Keith, G. R. Allen & Lord, 2012

Species of fish

Sicyopterus stiphodonoides is a species of goby in the family Oxudercidae, or alternatively, Gobiidae. It is found from northern New Guinea to the Solomon Islands. Specifically, it is known from the Cyclops Coast in Western New Guinea (Indonesia), D'Entrecasteaux Islands and New Britain off eastern/northeastern New Guinea (Papua New Guinea), and Choiseul Island and Kolombangara in the Solomon Archipelago.

== Description ==
Sicyopterus stiphodonoides can reach a standard length of 3.3 centimetres (1.3 in).
