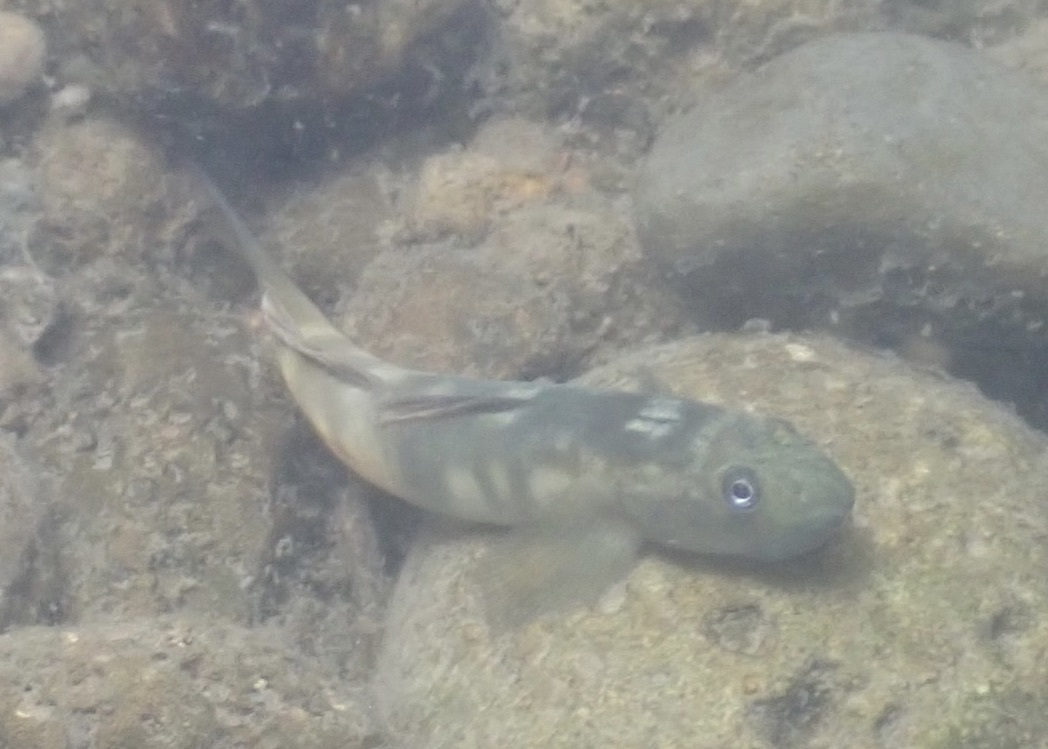

Conservation status
- Data Deficient (IUCN 2.3)

Scientific classification
- Kingdom: Animalia
- Phylum: Chordata
- Class: Actinopterygii
- Order: Gobiiformes
- Family: Oxudercidae
- Genus: Lentipes
- Species: L. concolor

Binomial name
- Lentipes concolor (T. N. Gill, 1860)

Synonyms
- Sicyogaster concolor T. N. Gill, 1860; Lentipes seminudus Günther, 1880

= Hawaiian freshwater goby =

Species of fish

The Hawaiian freshwater goby, or ʻOʻopu (Lentipes concolor) is a species of goby endemic to Hawaii, commonly located in freshwater mountain streams in higher elevations.

== Geographic Distribution / Habitat ==
Located in upper regions of perennial streams on the Hawaiian Islands of Hawaiʻi, Maui, Molokai, Kauai, and Oahu, Lentipes concolor possess the ability to scale waterfalls during their migration back into fresh water. L. Concolor inhabits the widest variety of stream types, occupying streams of up to 750m elevation, and is well adapted to a range of conditions including floods and extended drought. Although the Lentipes Concolour has been listed as a Category One endangered species candidate, there have been reports of rising populations in recent years.

== Anatomy ==
Males of the L. concolor have been found to reach a length of 7 cm (2.8 in), while females only reach 6 cm (2.4 in). The species' body color tends to be grayish and olive-brown with darker irregular lateral spots that appear like dorsolateral bands. Although both sexes lack coloration in the anterior regions, males possess a yellow to bright red posterior trunk; a sex-based variation linked to immersion in formalin or naturally occurring formaldehyde in water. Females have sometimes been found to show small black spots along the dorsal midline. Another prevalent sex-distinguishing feature would be the spacing of dorsal fins. In males, the second dorsal fin is positioned closer to the first dorsal than in the female. Additionally, the skull morphology has been found to have size differences between males and females in the median notch of the upper lip and head length relative to the pectoral fin and body lengths. L. concolor possesses small and scattered cycloid scales limited to the posterior half of the trunk. Males of the species generally comprise fewer total scales (2-120) than females (20-150). Compared to scales in juveniles, scales are thin, often embedded, sometimes degenerate, and decrease in number with increasing body length and maturity (MACIOLEK, J. A. 1978).

These fish utilize the "powerburst" mechanism, where fish push off against surfaces with their pectoral fins and propel upwards reattaching to the surface with pelvic suction. The fish pushes forward with the pectoral fins while detaching the pelvic disk and rapidly undulating the body from side to side. This mechanism allows L. concolor to climb faster and reach further upstream compared to the Awaous Guamensis and other freshwater fish found in Hawaii.

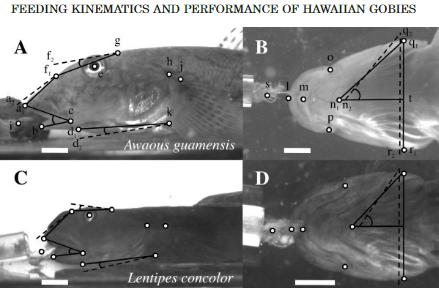
Lateral and ventral views of Awaous guamensis [A and B] and Lentipes concolor [C and D]. Source: (Maie., et al. 2009).

The species are able to climb these heights, in part, as a result of its herbivory. This might give it the ability to feed and restore muscle energy by consuming algae (diatoms are algae) on the surfaces of the falls as it climbs.

== Life History ==
The Hawaiian goby is amphidromous and has lengthy marine larval phases that facilitate dispersal. Amphidromy is a life cycle that consists of spending time split between freshwater and marine environments. Upon emerging from laid eggs, larvae drift downstream to their oceanic feeding sites and become a part of the pelagic zooplankton community until they mature into post larvae. Once reaching maturity to the post-larvae stage they migrate back into fresh water where they metamorphose rapidly into juveniles.

L. concolor is notable for its unusual method of returning to the spawning beds (something they however share with a few other gobies, including another Hawaiian species, Sicyopterus stimpsoni); they use suction disks on their ventral sides to climb the wet rocks behind waterfalls, even scaling the 442 ft-high (135 m) Akaka Falls.

Interestingly, studies have shown that downstream movement of larvae occurs more commonly during new-moon phases. Disruptions in spawning behaviors of Lentipes Concolor have been linked to the lack of lunar periodicity in upper streams leading to higher frequencies and flash flood intensity.

== Diet ==
L. concolor has been found to consume a greater proportion of plant materials with up to 93.1% dry biomass and 6.5% animal material. Lentipes Concolor are omnivorous and utilize suction feeding, as they possess a jaw skeleton with a lever system suited for fast jaw opening.

L.Concolor has been found to consume green algae and a range of insect larvae captured by suction feeding when these larvae are washed into streams. In many streams, the most common food items are the larvae of chironomid flies who lay their eggs on rocks near the water line. These fish also "frequently dart up from the bottom and intercept particles carried downstream in a manner reminiscent of the sallying behavior of insectivorous birds that fly up from a perch and capture insect prey. It has not been determined to what extent the omnivorous fishes are digesting plant material rather than receiving nutrition from the periphyton (aufwuchs) attached to it."

== Decline in Native Oʻopu populations ==
Lentipes concolor has been listed as a Category One endangered species candidate. This species has become a management priority for the State of Hawaiʻi and federal agencies, with research on the biology being initiated in 1973.

The 3 major threats to Lentipes Concolor include in-stream habitat degradation, exotic species introductions, and the loss of "ridge-to-reef" migratory corridors due to the disruption of surface water connectivity.

Water use for humans including extraction and diversions substantially alters the distribution through the reduced availability of in-stream habitat and by disrupting surface water connectivity. The disruption of surface water connectivity reduces or eliminates freshwater flow into coastal marine environments. Additionally, urbanization eliminates riparian vegetation, channelization, and streambed stabilizations that result in shallow, straight, concrete-lined channels. This alteration in the environment intended for flood control has reduced habitats for feeding, predator avoidance, and reproduction for native fishes. Furthermore, marine larvae are directly reduced due to the effects of urbanization and coastal developments resulting in heavy metals, chlorinated hydrocarbons, petrochemicals, nutrients, and bacteria contamination.

Climate change is expected to negatively affect rainfall and cloud water deposition, which are both key atmospheric sources of water that support surface flow in oceanic island streams. In addition, climate change leads to ocean acidification and the increase in temperatures will enhance energy demands for metabolism.

The introduction of Invasive species alters native communities through increased predation and competition over the availability of nutrients. Introduced game fish such as largemouth and smallmouth bass have been identified as predators of post-larvae and adults that reduce ʻoʻopu populations.

== Cultural and Historical Significance ==
This species is important to the native people as a food fish. In Ancient Hawaii, this species, and others such as mullet and Kuhlia sandvicensis, were cultivated in the form of freshwater aquaponics or aquatic polyculture. In this system of farming, the taro in the upland paddies (taro being the primary staple in Ancient Hawaii) was aided by fish such as the Hawaiʻian freshwater goby, through these fish pruning the leaves and eating the pests, thus leading to a symbiotic system of food production.

== Sources ==
- Gimenez Dixon, M (1996). "Lentipes concolor". IUCN Red List of Threatened Species. 1996 e.T11501A3287697. doi:10.2305/IUCN.UK.1996.RLTS.T11501A3287697.en.
- Bishop Museum. Lentipes concolor. Archived at Wayback Machine, 12 January 2015. Available: http://www.bishopmuseum.org/research/natsci/waipiostudy/students/meet_the_critters/fish/native/Lentipes_concolor.htm
- Froese, Rainer; Pauly, Daniel (eds.). "Lentipes concolor". FishBase.
- Rosauer, Ruth. "Ancient Hawaiian Aquaculture".
- Spalding, Mark J; Peyton, Kathryn; Milton, Ashley (15 July 2013). "The Past Speaks to the Future: Sustainable Ancient Aquaculture". The Ocean Foundation.
- University of Hawaiʻi at Mānoa. Food in Old Hawaiʻi. Ka Hana ʻImi Naʻauao. Retrieved 3 February 2015.
- Way, Carl M.; Burky, Albert J.; Harding, Juliana M.; Hau, Skippy; Puleloa, William K.L.C. (January 1998). "Reproductive biology of the endemic goby, Lentipes concolor, from Makamaka'ole Stream, Maui and Waikolu Stream, Moloka'i". Environmental Biology of Fishes. 51 (1): 53–65. Bibcode:1998EnvBF..51...53W. doi:10.1023/A:1007305917443.
- Mack, E (2014). "Where badass fish climb rock cliffs... with their mouths". CNET.
- Brasher, Anne M. D. (2003). "Impacts of Human Disturbances on Biotic Communities in Hawaiian Streams". BioScience. 53 (11): 1052. doi:10.1641/0006-3568(2003)053[1052:IOHDOB]2.0.CO;2.
- Devick, William S.; Michael Fitzsimons, J.; Nishimoto, Robert T. (December 1995). "Threatened fishes of the world:Lentipes concolor Gill, 1860 (Gobiidde)". Environmental Biology of Fishes. 44 (4): 325–326. Bibcode:1995EnvBF..44..325D. doi:10.1007/BF00008246.
- Fitzsimons, J Michael; McRae, Mark G (2007). "Behavioral Ecology of Indigenous Stream Fishes in Hawaiʻi" (PDF). In Evenhuis, N.L.; Fitzsimons, J.M. (eds.). Biology of Hawaiian Streams and Estuaries. Bishop Museum Bulletin in Cultural and Environmental Studies. Vol. 3. pp. 11–21. ISBN 978-1-58178-053-6.
- Fitzsimons, J.Michael; Zink, Robert M.; Nishimoto, Robert T. (January 1990). "Genetic variation in the Hawaiian stream goby, Lentipes concolor". Biochemical Systematics and Ecology. 18 (1): 81–83. Bibcode:1990BioSE..18...81F. doi:10.1016/0305-1978(90)90038-H.
- Kinzie, Robert A. (July 1993). "Reproductive biology of an endemic, amphidromous goby Lentipes concolor in Hawaiian streams". Environmental Biology of Fishes. 37 (3): 257–268. Bibcode:1993EnvBF..37..257K. doi:10.1007/BF00004633.
- Maciolek, J. A. (October 1977). Taxonomic Status, Biology, and Distribution of Hawaiian Lentipes, a Diadromous Goby (Thesis). hdl:10125/1337.
- Maie, Takashi (2007). Feeding performance in Hawaiian stream goby fishes: Morphological and functional analysis (Thesis). ProQuest 304886169.
- Maie, Takashi; Schoenfuss, Heiko L.; Blob, Richard W. (August 2009). "Jaw lever analysis of Hawaiian gobioid stream fishes: A simulation study of morphological diversity and functional performance". Journal of Morphology. 270 (8): 976–983. doi:10.1002/jmor.10737. PMID 19274745.
- Maie, Takashi; Wilson, Megan P.; Schoenfuss, Heiko L.; Blob, Richard W. (March 2009). "Feeding kinematics and performance of Hawaiian stream gobies, Awaous guamensis and Lentipes concolor: Linkage of functional morphology and ecology". Journal of Morphology. 270 (3): 344–356. doi:10.1002/jmor.10695. PMID 19107821.
- McRae, Mark (2007). Watershed-scale patterns of seaward migration in Lentipes concolor, a Hawaiian stream goby (Thesis). doi:10.31390/gradschool_dissertations.376. ProQuest 304836429.
