= Sicyopterus punctissimus =

Conservation status
- Data Deficient (IUCN 3.1)

Scientific classification
- Kingdom: Animalia
- Phylum: Chordata
- Class: Actinopterygii
- Order: Gobiiformes
- Family: Oxudercidae
- Genus: Sicyopterus
- Species: S. punctissimus

Binomial name
- Sicyopterus punctissimus Sparks & D. W. Nelson, 2004

Species of fish

Sicyopterus punctissimus is a species of goby endemic to Madagascar where it occurs in clear, fast-flowing rivers and streams. This species can reach a length of 12.2 centimetres (4.8 in) SL.
