= Stiphodon sapphirinus =

Scientific classification
- Domain: Eukaryota
- Kingdom: Animalia
- Phylum: Chordata
- Class: Actinopterygii
- Order: Gobiiformes
- Family: Oxudercidae
- Genus: Stiphodon
- Species: S. sapphirinus

Binomial name
- Stiphodon sapphirinus R. E. Watson, Keith & Marquet, 2005

Species of fish

Stiphodon sapphirinus, the sapphire stiphodon, is a species of goby found both the North Province and South Province of New Caledonia and in Vanuatu. This species can reach a length of 3.0 centimetres (1.2 in) SL.
