= Stiphodon rutilaureus =

Scientific classification
- Domain: Eukaryota
- Kingdom: Animalia
- Phylum: Chordata
- Class: Actinopterygii
- Order: Gobiiformes
- Family: Oxudercidae
- Genus: Stiphodon
- Species: S. rutilaureus

Binomial name
- Stiphodon rutilaureus Watson, 1996

Species of fish

The Golden-red stiphodon Stiphodon rutilaureus is a species of goby found in Papua New Guinea, the Solomon Islands and Vanuatu. This species can reach a length of 3.2 centimetres (1.3 in) SL.
