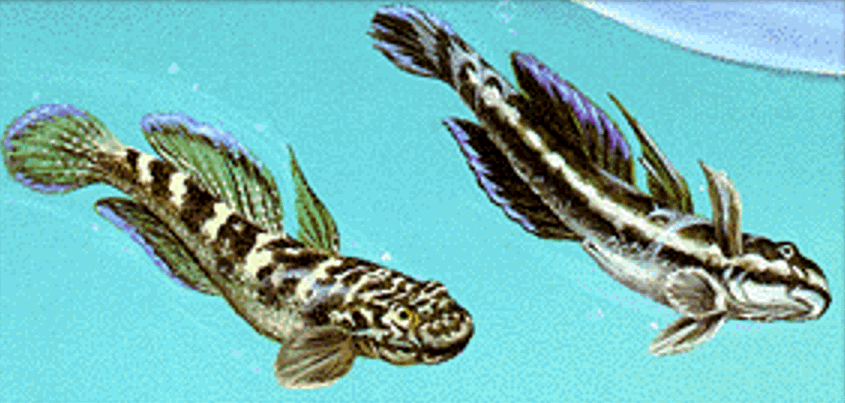
- Illustration
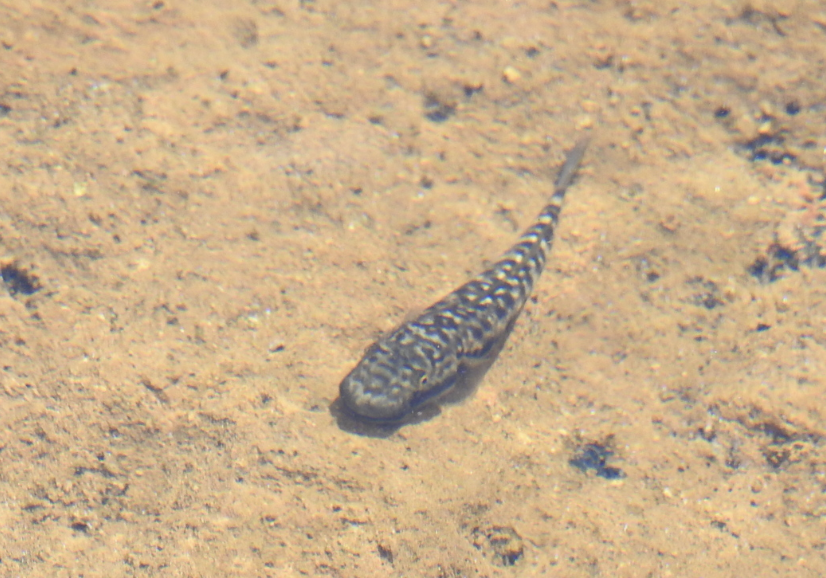
- Live animal seen on Hawaiʻi

Conservation status
- Near Threatened (IUCN 2.3)

Scientific classification
- Kingdom: Animalia
- Phylum: Chordata
- Class: Actinopterygii
- Order: Gobiiformes
- Family: Oxudercidae
- Genus: Sicyopterus
- Species: S. stimpsoni

Binomial name
- Sicyopterus stimpsoni (T. N. Gill, 1860)

Synonyms
- Sicydium stimpsoni T. N. Gill, 1860; Sicydium albotaeniatum Günther, 1877; Sicydium nigrescens Günther, 1880; Vitraria clarescens D. S. Jordan & Evermann, 1903

= Sicyopterus stimpsoni =

Species of fish

Sicyopterus stimpsoni, commonly known as the Nopili rockclimbing goby, oopu nopili, or Stimpson's goby, is a species of amphidromous goby endemic to the islands of Hawaii. This species can reach a length of 19.8 centimetres (7.8 in) SL.

== Ecology ==
Juveniles move from saltwater to freshwater streams shortly before changes in the anatomy of their mouths make eating plankton impossible. Their dietary behaviour depends critically on the benthic algal cycle, which is locked into the hydrological cycles of the island streams.

The species in its adult form is found in the upper parts of clear, fast-running mountain streams, where there is clean gravel and rocks with no sedimentation, allowing the growth of algae on rock surfaces. It is found on all the Hawaiian Islands, although it has become rare on Oahu. The species is herbivorous, feeding only on diatoms and filamentous algae, and vigorously defending its feeding patch. The fish cultivate gardens on the upper surfaces of stones and boulders. Here they encourage a short turf of diatoms, filamentous algae and blue-green algae. The males guard these territorial gardens, and they play a part in courtship.

The males display brilliant blue and red colours during the breeding season, colours which change with the mood of the fish. The females attach their eggs to rocks where they are fertilised by the males, and the hatchlings are immediately washed downstream into the sea, where they develop, later to return to the freshwater pools upstream, where they live for several years. To arrive at these pools the juveniles need to climb the vertical rock under and beside very high waterfalls. The climbing is postponed until their mouthparts have moved from a forward-facing position to under the body. This change is effected in two days, altering their diet from that of a filter feeder to feeding almost exclusively on algae growing on the rock surfaces, and not coincidentally enabling them to ascend slippery waterfall rocks by using mouth and pelvic suckers.

It is preyed upon by black-crowned night herons and during its upstream migration through the estuary by Caranx spp., Polydactylus sexfilis and Sphyraena barracuda.

== Conservation ==
Five of the seven native freshwater fish species on Hawaii are gobioid. Three of these gobioids, S. stimpsoni (this article), Awaous stamineus (endemic) and Lentipes concolor (endemic) are amphidromous stream dwellers, which are adapted to the steep torrents of Hawaii's mountains (Eleotris sandwicensis and Stenogobius hawaiiensis, both endemic, are unable to pass steep torrents). This makes them extremely sensitive to habitat disturbance.

== Etymology ==
The specific name honours the marine biologist William Stimpson (1832-1872), who was the collector of the type specimen.
