= Sicyopterus franouxi =

Conservation status
- Least Concern (IUCN 3.1)

Scientific classification
- Kingdom: Animalia
- Phylum: Chordata
- Class: Actinopterygii
- Order: Gobiiformes
- Family: Oxudercidae
- Genus: Sicyopterus
- Species: S. franouxi

Binomial name
- Sicyopterus franouxi (Pellegrin, 1935)

Synonyms
- Sicydium franouxi Pellegrin, 1935

Species of fish

Sicyopterus franouxi is a species of goby endemic to Madagascar where it is only found in fresh waters. This species can reach a length of 13.1 centimetres (5.2 in) SL.
