= Stiphodon zebrinus =

Scientific classification
- Domain: Eukaryota
- Kingdom: Animalia
- Phylum: Chordata
- Class: Actinopterygii
- Order: Gobiiformes
- Family: Oxudercidae
- Genus: Stiphodon
- Species: S. zebrinus

Binomial name
- Stiphodon zebrinus Watson, G. R. Allen & Kottelat, 1998

Species of fish

Stiphodon zebrinus is a species of goby known only from Sungei Iga, Halmahera, Indonesia. This species can reach a length of 2.3 centimetres (0.91 in) SL.
