= Stiphodon discotorquatus =

Conservation status
- Critically endangered, possibly extinct (IUCN 3.1)

Scientific classification
- Domain: Eukaryota
- Kingdom: Animalia
- Phylum: Chordata
- Class: Actinopterygii
- Order: Gobiiformes
- Family: Oxudercidae
- Genus: Stiphodon
- Species: S. discotorquatus

Binomial name
- Stiphodon discotorquatus Watson, 1995

Species of fish

Stiphodon discotorquatus is a species of goby found in French Polynesia. This species can reach a length of 2.6 centimetres (1.0 in) SL.
