= Lipstick goby =

Conservation status
- Endangered (IUCN 3.1)

Scientific classification
- Kingdom: Animalia
- Phylum: Chordata
- Class: Actinopterygii
- Order: Gobiiformes
- Family: Oxudercidae
- Genus: Sicyopus
- Species: S. jonklaasi

Binomial name
- Sicyopus jonklaasi (H. R. Axelrod, 1972)

Synonyms
- Gobius jonklaasi H. R. Axelrod, 1972; Sicyopus jonklaasi Klausewitz & Henrich, 1986

Species of ray-finned fish

Sicyopus jonklaasi, the lipstick goby, is a species of goby endemic to Sri Lanka where it occurs in rocky hill streams of swift-flowing water. It has sucking discs on its underside that it uses to adhere to the sides of rocks. Newly hatched larvae are washed to the sea by heavy flows brought on by rains and mature there before returning to the streams. This species can reach a length of 4.5 cm (1.8 in) TL. The lipstick goby is commonly found in the aquarium trade.
