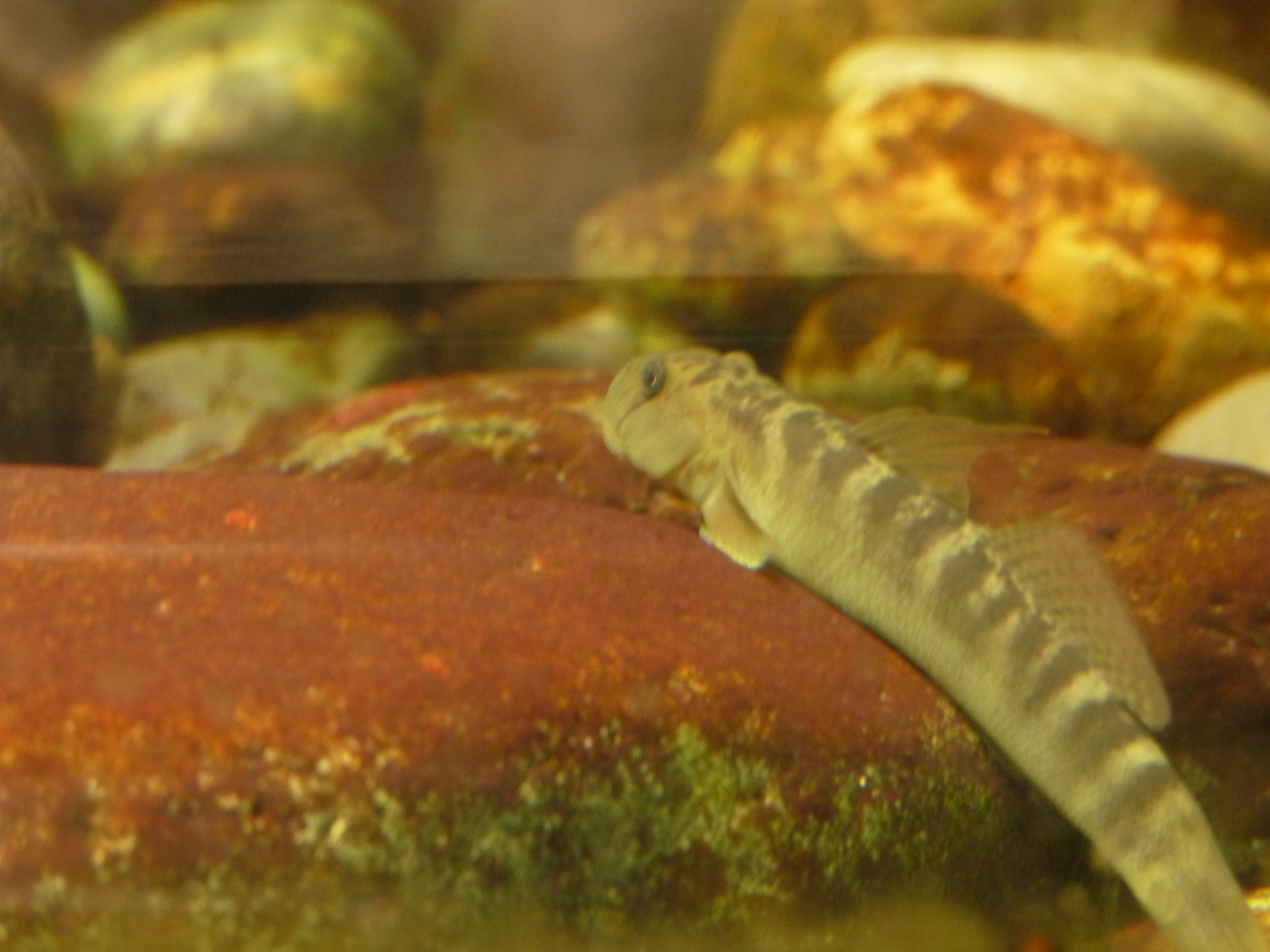
- Sicyopterus japonicus

Scientific classification
- Kingdom: Animalia
- Phylum: Chordata
- Class: Actinopterygii
- Order: Gobiiformes
- Family: Oxudercidae
- Subfamily: Sicydiinae
- Genus: Sicyopterus; T. N. Gill, 1860

Type species
- Sicydium (Sicyopterus) stimpsoni T. N. Gill, 1860

Synonyms
- Bryanina Fowler, 1932; Microsicydium Bleeker, 1874; Papenua Herre, 1935; Rewa Whitley, 1950; Sicidium Bleeker, 1874; Sicydiops Bleeker, 1874; Vitraria Jordan & Evermann, 1903

= Sicyopterus =

Genus of fishes

Sicyopterus is a genus of gobies native fresh waters from Madagascar to the Pacific islands.

== Species ==
There are currently 37 recognized species in this genus:

- Sicyopterus aiensis Keith, Watson & Marquet, 2004 (Creek Ai's goby)
- Sicyopterus brevis de Beaufort, 1912
- Sicyopterus calliochromus Keith, G. R. Allen & Lord, 2012
- Sicyopterus caudimaculatus Maugé, Marquet & Laboute, 1992
- Sicyopterus crassus Herre, 1927
- Sicyopterus cynocephalus (Valenciennes, 1837) (Cleft-lipped goby)
- Sicyopterus erythropterus Keith, G. R. Allen & Lord, 2012
- Sicyopterus eudentatus Parenti & Maciolek, 1993
- Sicyopterus fasciatus (F. Day, 1874)
- Sicyopterus franouxi (Pellegrin, 1935)
- Sicyopterus fuliag Herre, 1927
- Sicyopterus griseus (F. Day, 1877)
- Sicyopterus hageni Popta, 1921 (Hagen's goby)
- Sicyopterus japonicus (S. Tanaka (I), 1909)
- Sicyopterus lacrymosus Herre, 1927
- Sicyopterus lagocephalus (Pallas, 1770) (Red-tailed goby)=Sicyopterus caeruleus (Lacépède, 1800)=Sicyopterus laticeps (Valenciennes, 1837)
- Sicyopterus lengguru Keith, Lord & Hadiaty, 2012
- Sicyopterus lividus Parenti & Maciolek, 1993
- Sicyopterus longifilis de Beaufort, 1912 (Thread-fin goby)
- Sicyopterus macrostetholepis (Bleeker, 1853)
- Sicyopterus marquesensis Fowler, 1932
- Sicyopterus microcephalus (Bleeker, 1855)
- Sicyopterus micrurus (Bleeker, 1853) (Clinging goby)
- Sicyopterus ocellaris Keith, G. R. Allen & Lord, 2012
- Sicyopterus ouwensi M. C. W. Weber, 1913 (Ouwen's goby)
- Sicyopterus panayensis Herre, 1927
- Sicyopterus parvei (Bleeker, 1853)
- Sicyopterus pugnans (Ogilvie-Grant, 1884)
- Sicyopterus punctissimus Sparks & D. W. Nelson, 2004
- Sicyopterus rapa Parenti & Maciolek, 1996
- Sicyopterus sarasini M. C. W. Weber & de Beaufort, 1915
- Sicyopterus squamosissimus Keith, Lord, Busson, Sauri, Hubert & Hadiaty, 2015
- Sicyopterus stimpsoni (T. N. Gill, 1860) (Stimpson's goby)
- Sicyopterus stiphodonoides Keith, G. R. Allen & Lord, 2012
- Sicyopterus wichmanni (M. C. W. Weber, 1894)
