= Stiphodon martenstyni =

Conservation status
- Critically endangered, possibly extinct (IUCN 3.1)

Scientific classification
- Domain: Eukaryota
- Kingdom: Animalia
- Phylum: Chordata
- Class: Actinopterygii
- Order: Gobiiformes
- Family: Oxudercidae
- Genus: Stiphodon
- Species: S. martenstyni

Binomial name
- Stiphodon martenstyni Watson, 1998

Species of fish

Stiphodon martenstyni, the Martenstyn's stiphodon or Martenstyn's goby, is a species of amphidromous freshwater goby endemic to the southwestern portion of Sri Lanka. The males of this species can reach a length of 3.4 centimetres (1.3 in) SL.

== Etymology ==
The specific name martenstyni is named in memory of Cedric Martenstyn, who was a leading naturalist of the country killed by the Tamil militant organization Liberation Tigers of Tamil Eelam (LTTE).
