= Sicyopterus calliochromus =

Conservation status
- Near Threatened (IUCN 3.1)

Scientific classification
- Kingdom: Animalia
- Phylum: Chordata
- Class: Actinopterygii
- Order: Gobiiformes
- Family: Oxudercidae
- Genus: Sicyopterus
- Species: S. calliochromus

Binomial name
- Sicyopterus calliochromus Keith, G. R. Allen & Lord, 2012
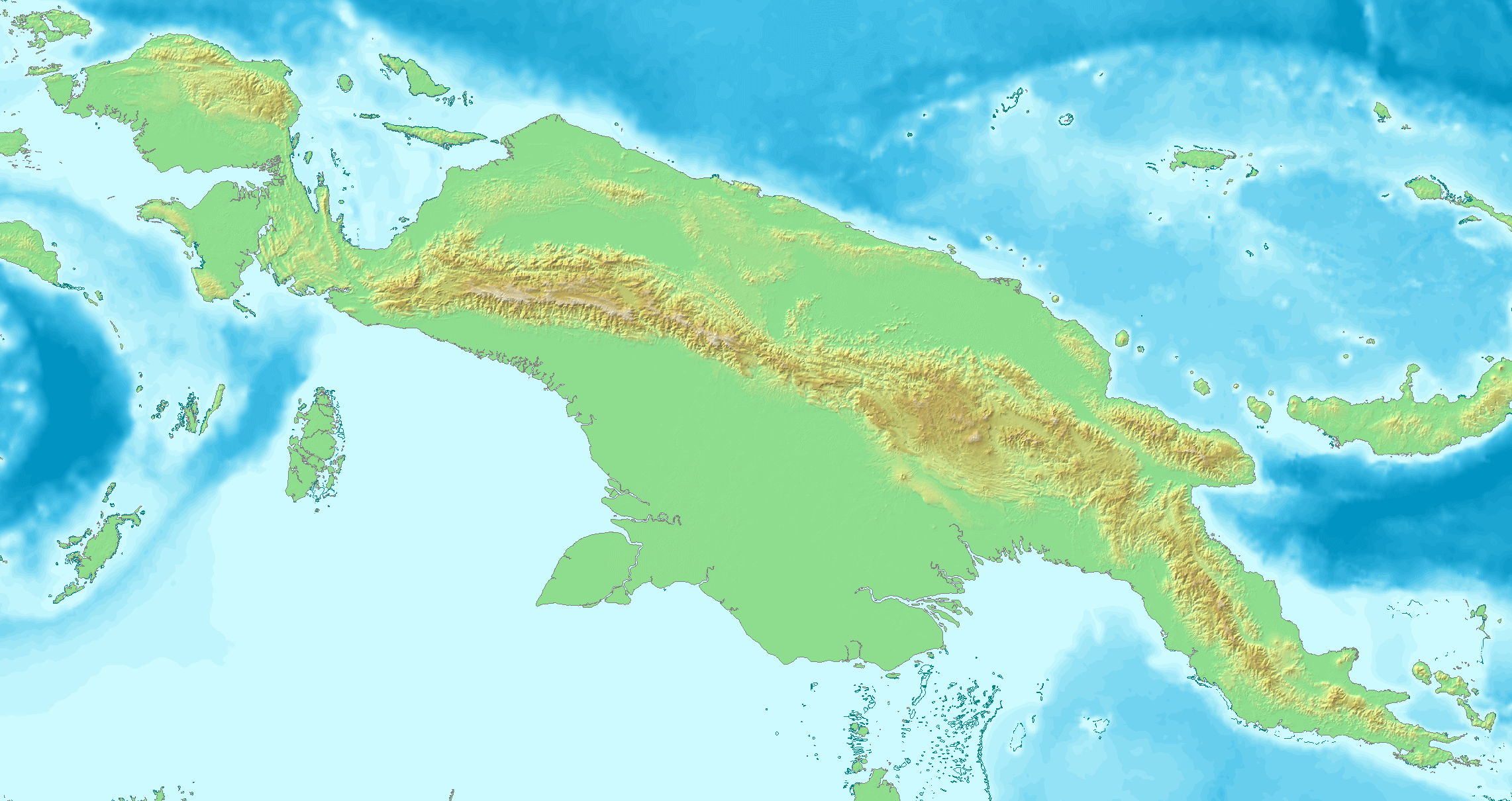
- Sicyopterus calliochromus is only known from Tirawiwa River in Western New Guinea (Indonesia)

Species of fish

Sicyopterus calliochromus is a species of goby in the family Oxudercidae, or alternatively, Gobiidae. It is only known from the waters of the Tirawiwa River, which is a major tributary of the Wapoga River, which in turn flows into the eastern edge of Cenderawasih Bay, in the Papua Province in Indonesia.

== Description ==
Sicyopterus calliochromus can reach a standard length of 5.8 centimetres (2.3 in).
