= Stiphodon larson =

Conservation status
- Data Deficient (IUCN 3.1)

Scientific classification
- Kingdom: Animalia
- Phylum: Chordata
- Class: Actinopterygii
- Division: Teleostei
- Order: Gobiiformes
- Family: Oxudercidae
- Genus: Stiphodon
- Species: S. larson

Binomial name
- Stiphodon larson Watson, 1996

Species of fish

Stiphodon larson, Larson's cling goby, is a species of goby found in Papua New Guinea. The species inhabits relatively swift, clear freshwater streams with rocky bottoms and is considered amphidromous. Males or individuals of unspecified sex can reach about 3.1 cm (1.2 in) SL, while females have been recorded at up to 3.3 cm (1.3 in).

== Etymology ==
The fish is named in honor of Helen K. Larson, the Curator of Fishes at the Museum and Art Gallery of the Northern Territory in Darwin, Australia.
