= Stiphodon surrufus =

Conservation status
- Least Concern (IUCN 3.1)

Scientific classification
- Kingdom: Animalia
- Phylum: Chordata
- Class: Actinopterygii
- Order: Gobiiformes
- Family: Oxudercidae
- Genus: Stiphodon
- Species: S. surrufus

Binomial name
- Stiphodon surrufus Watson & Kottelat, 1995

Species of fish

Stiphodon surrufus is a species of goby endemic to the Philippines where it is only known to occur in Lagu Lagu creek on Leyte Island. It inhabits areas with boulders and swift-flowing water. This species can reach a length of 2.1 centimetres (0.83 in) SL.
