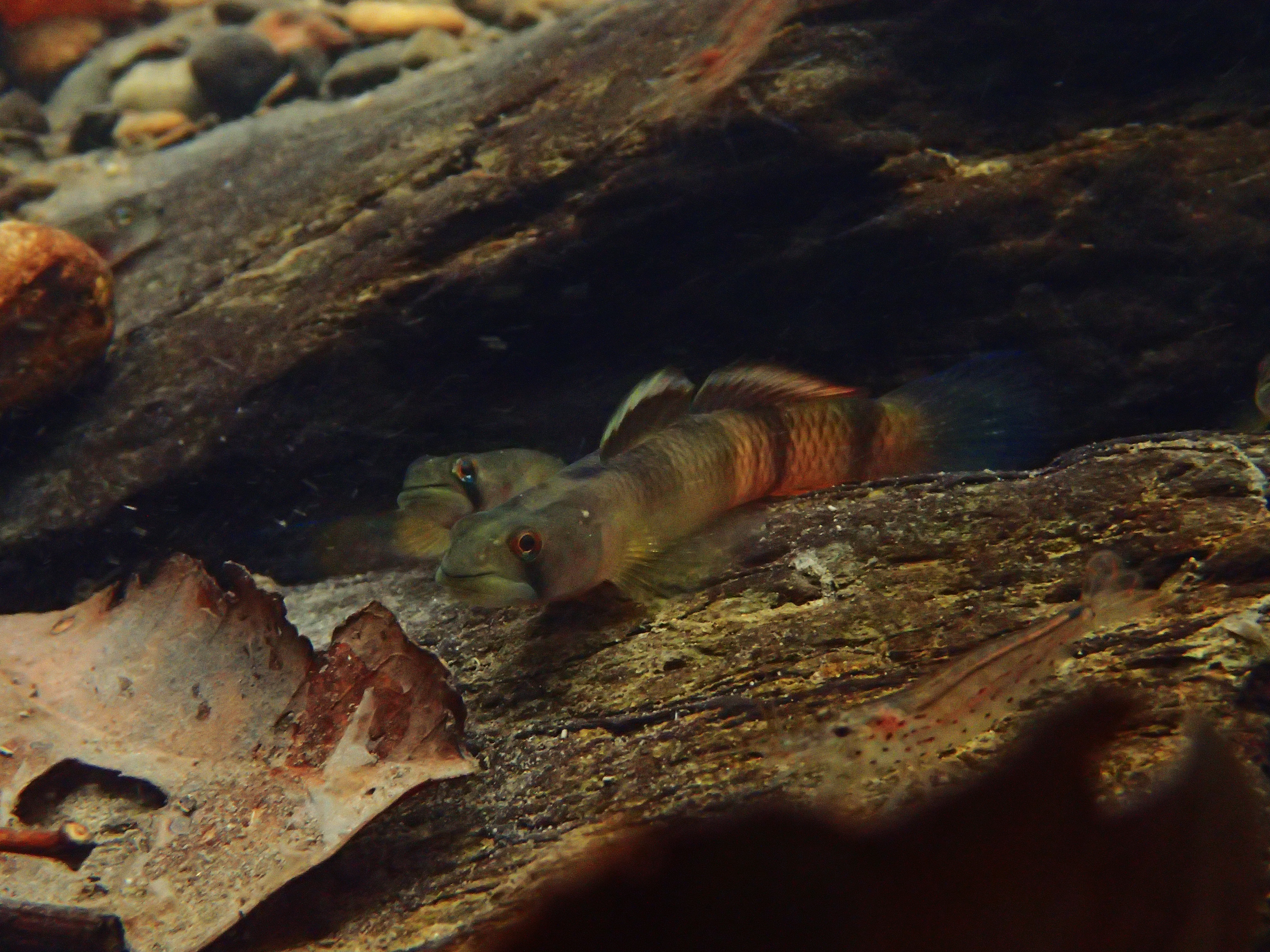
- Sicyopus zosterophorus

Scientific classification
- Kingdom: Animalia
- Phylum: Chordata
- Class: Actinopterygii
- Order: Gobiiformes
- Family: Oxudercidae
- Subfamily: Sicydiinae
- Genus: Sicyopus; T. N. Gill, 1863

Type species
- Sicydium zosterophorum Bleeker, 1857

Synonyms
- Juxtastiphodon Watson, 1999

= Sicyopus =

Genus of fishes

Sicyopus is a genus of small gobies. Most are native to fast-flowing streams and rivers in Southeast Asia and Melanesia, but S. zosterophorus also occurs in China, Japan and Palau, S. nigriradiatus is restricted to Pohnpei, S. jonklaasi is restricted to Sri Lanka, and S. lord is restricted to Madagascar.

== Species ==
There are currently 10 recognized species in this genus:

- Sicyopus auxilimentus Watson & Kottelat, 1994
- Sicyopus cebuensis I. S. Chen & K. T. Shao, 1998
- Sicyopus discordipinnis Watson, 1995
- Sicyopus exallisquamulus Watson & Kottelat, 2006
- Sicyopus jonklaasi H. R. Axelrod, 1972 (Lipstick goby)
- Sicyopus lord Keith, Marquet & Taillebois, 2011 (Lord's sicyopus)
- Sicyopus multisquamatus de Beaufort, 1912
- Sicyopus nigriradiatus Parenti & Maciolek, 1993
- Sicyopus rubicundus Keith, Hadiaty, Busson & Hubert, 2014
- Sicyopus zosterophorus Bleeker, 1856
