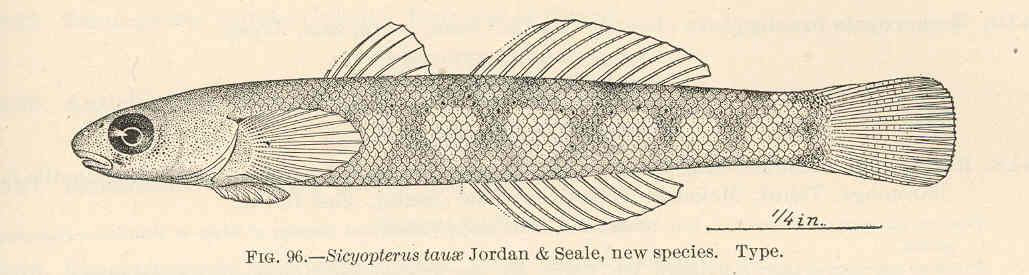

Conservation status
- Least Concern (IUCN 3.1)

Scientific classification
- Kingdom: Animalia
- Phylum: Chordata
- Class: Actinopterygii
- Division: Teleostei
- Order: Gobiiformes
- Family: Oxudercidae
- Genus: Sicyopterus
- Species: S. lagocephalus

Binomial name
- Sicyopterus lagocephalus (Pallas, 1770)

Synonyms
- Bryanina inana Fowler, 1932; Gobius lagocephalus Pallas, 1770; Sicydium gymnauchen Bleeker, 1858; Sicydium halei F. Day, 1888; Sicydium lagocephalum (Pallas, 1770); Sicydium lagocephalus (Pallas, 1770); Sicydium laticeps Valenciennes, 1837; Sicydium taeniurum Günther, 1877; Sicyopterus caeruleus (Lacépède, 1800); Sicyopterus extraneus Herre, 1927; Sicyopterus gymnauchen (Bleeker, 1858); Sicyopterus halei (F. Day, 1888); Sicyopterus laticeps (Valenciennes, 1837); Sicyopterus taeniurus (Günther, 1877); Sicyopterus tauae D. S. Jordan & Seale, 1906; Sicyopus halei (F. Day, 1888)

= Sicyopterus lagocephalus =

Species of fish

Sicyopterus lagocephalus, the red-tailed goby or blue stream goby, is a species of goby native to islands of the Indian Ocean from the Comoros to the Mascarene Islands to the Pacific Ocean where it reaches French Polynesia and can be found as far north as Japan. It is an amphidromous species: adults can be found in swift-flowing streams with rocky beds but the eggs hatch at sea and the larval stage remains in marine waters, migrating to freshwaters when they reach the postlarval stage. This species can reach a total length of 13 cm (5 in). In some places it is an important species for local consumption with the post-larvae being caught as they mass in estuaries.

== Description ==
Male Sicyopterus lagocephalus can grow to a total length of about 13 cm (5.1 in) while females can reach 10.6 cm (4.2 in). The dorsal fin is divided in two and has 6 to 7 spines and 9 to 10 soft rays. The anal fin has a single spine and 10 soft rays. The pectoral fin has about 19 soft rays. During the rainy season, males become very colourful; the sides are metallic bluish-green, the tail is orange-red and there are about seven dark, saddle-shaped markings on the back. Females are grey or brown with dark saddle markings, a pale belly and a black and white band at the base of the tail.

== Distribution and habitat ==
This species has a wide distribution in the tropical Pacific. Its range extends from Sri Lanka and the Mascarene Islands to Japan, Taiwan, the Philippines, Papua New Guinea, Australia, the Marshall Islands and French Polynesia. Adults live in fast-flowing streams with rocky beds while the larvae live in the ocean.

== Ecology ==
The female S. lagocephalus lays its eggs in fresh water. After hatching, the larvae repeatedly rise towards the surface of the stream and then sink down again; this helps them to get carried along by the current. They consume their yolk sacs and will die if they do not reach the sea within about seven days. On arrival in the marine environment they are between 1 and 4 mm (0.04 and 0.16 in) long, and start to feed on plankton. They are translucent at this stage and remain at sea for somewhere between 133 and 256 days before getting the urge to migrate back into fresh water. The post-larval stage starts as they enter estuaries. They have already developed suction discs, but now they undergo metamorphosis, their mouths move from the tip of the snout to the underneath of the head, they begin to develop pigment, the pectoral fins transform, the tail loses its fork, they grow teeth on the premaxillae bone, changes occur in the cranium and changes in osmoregulation take place. As the rake-like teeth push through, they start to feed on diatoms and algae that they scrape off the substrate. After two days in the estuary, the juvenile fish move upstream, overcoming small waterfalls with the aid of their suction discs, and after about three or four weeks of migration start to take up territories in the fast-flowing streams where they will breed.
