= Sicyopterus griseus =

Conservation status
- Least Concern (IUCN 3.1)

Scientific classification
- Domain: Eukaryota
- Kingdom: Animalia
- Phylum: Chordata
- Class: Actinopterygii
- Order: Gobiiformes
- Family: Oxudercidae
- Genus: Sicyopterus
- Species: S. griseus

Binomial name
- Sicyopterus griseus (F. Day, 1874)

Synonyms
- Sicydium griseum Day, 1877

Species of fish

Sicyopterus griseus, the Clown goby, is a species of goby endemic to India and Sri Lanka, where it is found in estuaries, blackwaters, and fresh waters. The populations within Sri Lanka is not yet internationally accepted, due to lack of evidences (Jayaram 1999). This species can reach a length of 9.7 centimetres (3.8 in) SL.
