= Sicyopus cebuensis =

Conservation status
- Data Deficient (IUCN 3.1)

Scientific classification
- Kingdom: Animalia
- Phylum: Chordata
- Class: Actinopterygii
- Order: Gobiiformes
- Family: Oxudercidae
- Genus: Sicyopus
- Species: S. cebuensis

Binomial name
- Sicyopus cebuensis Chen & Shao, 1998

Species of fish

Sicyopus cebuensis is a species of fish that was first documented by Chen and Shao in 1998, who documented just a single adult pair located in the Uling brook within the upper Naga River basin in the City of Naga, Cebu province, the Philippines.

The species appears to prefer clear mountain streams.

Since the original identification and documentation, a single adult male has been spotted also on the island of Cebu by tour guide Larry Honoridiz and wildlife biologist Robert Drew Adams around the Kawasan Falls in Badian, Central Visayas.
