= Smilosicyopus =

Scientific classification
- Kingdom: Animalia
- Phylum: Chordata
- Class: Actinopterygii
- Order: Gobiiformes
- Family: Gobiidae
- Genus: Smilosicyopus; Watson, 1999

Type species
- Sicyopus leprurus H. Sakai & M. Nakamura, 1979

Genus of fishes

Smilosicyopus is a genus of gobies native to Asia and Oceania.

== Species ==
There are currently seven recognized species in this genus:

- Smilosicyopus bitaeniatus (Maugé, Marquet & Laboute, 1992)
- Smilosicyopus chloe (Watson, Keith & Marquet, 2001) (Chloe's Sicyopus)
- Smilosicyopus fehlmanni (Parenti & Maciolek, 1993)
- Smilosicyopus leprurus (H. Sakai & M. Nakamura, 1979)
- Smilosicyopus mystax (Watson & G. R. Allen, 1999)
- Smilosicyopus pentecost (Keith, Lord & Taillebois, 2010) (Pentecost Sicyopus)
- Smilosicyopus sasali (Keith & Marquet, 2005) (Sasal's Sicyopus)
