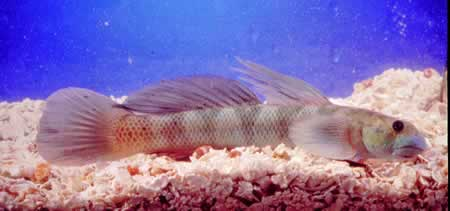
- Sicydium plumieri

Scientific classification
- Kingdom: Animalia
- Phylum: Chordata
- Class: Actinopterygii
- Order: Gobiiformes
- Family: Oxudercidae
- Subfamily: Sicydiinae
- Genus: Sicydium; Valenciennes, 1837

Type species
- Gobius plumieri Bloch, 1786

Synonyms
- Oreogobius Boulenger, 1899; Sicya D. S. Jordan & Evermann, 1896; Sicyosus D. S. Jordan & Evermann, 1898

= Sicydium =

Genus of fishes

Sicydium is a genus of gobies native to fast-flowing streams and rivers of the Americas (Central America, Mexico, Cocos Island, the Caribbean, Colombia, Ecuador and Venezuela) with a couple species native to Middle Africa.

== Species ==
There are currently 16 recognized species in this genus:

- Sicydium adelum W. A. Bussing, 1996
- Sicydium altum Meek, 1907
- Sicydium brevifile Ogilvie-Grant, 1884
- Sicydium buscki Evermann & H. W. Clark, 1906
- Sicydium bustamantei Greeff, 1884
- Sicydium cocoensis (Heller & Snodgrass, 1903)
- Sicydium crenilabrum I. J. Harrison, 1993
- Sicydium fayae Brock, 1942
- Sicydium gilberti Watson, 2000
- Sicydium gymnogaster Ogilvie-Grant, 1884 (Smoothbelly goby)
- Sicydium hildebrandi C. H. Eigenmann, 1918
- Sicydium multipunctatum Regan, 1906 (Multispotted goby)
- Sicydium plumieri (Bloch, 1786) (Sirajo)
- Sicydium punctatum Perugia, 1896 (Spotted algae-eating goby)
- Sicydium rosenbergii (Boulenger, 1899)
- Sicydium salvini Ogilvie-Grant, 1884
