= Ken Maeda =

Japanese comedian, impressionist, actor, & choreographer (1971–2016)

- 前田 健
- Born: 14 June 1971; Suginami, Tokyo
- Died: 26 April 2016 (aged 44)
- Other names: Maeken; Ken-chan (けんちゃん); Kenchimu (けんちむ)
- Education: Tokyo Metropolitan Agricultural High School
- Occupations: Comedian; impressionist; actor; choreographer
- Agent: K Dash Stage
- Style: Monomane
- Height: 1.74 m (5 ft 9 in)

Ken Maeda (前田 健, Maeda Ken; 14 June 1971 – 26 April 2016) was a Japanese comedian, impressionist, actor and choreographer. He was nicknamed Maeken (まえけん).

Maeda was born in Suginami, Tokyo. He was represented with K Dash Stage. Maeda graduated from Tokyo Metropolitan Agricultural High School. At the same school, his senior was Taizo Harada of the comedy trio Neptune.

== Comedy career ==
=== Impressions ===
- Ai
- Mayumi Itsuwa
- Hikaru Utada
- Yōko Oginome
- Crystal Kay
- Koda Kumi
- Ringo Sheena
- Ryoko Shinohara
- Janet Jackson
- Aya Sugimoto
- Stevie Wonder
- Toshiyuki Nishida
- Kohmi Hirose
- BoA
- Whitney Houston
- Michael Jackson
- Noriyuki Makihara
- Aya Matsuura
- Seiko Matsuda
- Yumi Matsutoya
- Ronaldinho

=== One-man shows ===
Title
Shokyū Eigo Kōza
Chūkyū Eigo Kōza
Honne shika Iwanai Honne-chan Series
Aisubeki Mochida-kun Series
Shizuka-chan
Wakame-chan
Furitsukeshi Pierre
Nukumori o Uru Obāsan
Shinji Shimae
Shitamachi no Cleaning-ya
Ningen Kansatsu Conte Series

== Filmography ==
=== Variety ===
Year	Title	Network	Notes
	Bakushō On-Air Battle	NHK-G	1 win and 5 losses; up to 365 KB (off-air; on-air was 329 KB)
	Monomane Grand Prix	NTV	
	MTM	MBS	
	PosiTV	RKB	
	Gachagacha Pong!	Fuji TV	
2006	Furifuri Song Book	Fuji TV One-Two-Next	As Freedom Maeda or Frill Maeda; Choreographed programme
	Aoi Sora ga Suki'!	YAB	
2008	Renai Hyakkei	TV Asahi	Episode 94; Guest
2015	Ad' zehi Nenmatsu Namahōsō: Ken Maeda Geinō Seikatsu 20-shūnenkinen Kagayake! 2016-Nen Fukuotoko Fukume Kettei-sen omoshiroidesu yō	CTV	

=== TV drama ===
Year	Title	Role	Network	Notes
2002	Remote		NTV	Episode 8
2006	Gal Circle		NTV	
2006	Urami-ya Honpo	Moshin Tsukida	TV Tokyo	Regular
2007	Otorisōsa-kan Shiho Kitami 12	Masato Ebina	TV Asahi	
2007	Hotaru no Hikari	Disgusting manager	NTV	Episode 7
2007	Juken no Kamisama		NTV	Episode 5
2007	Nagai Nagai Satsujin	Ryuichi Morimoto	WOWOW	
2008	Tadashii Ouji no Tsukuri Kata	Shigeo Sangawa, Sekio Mitarai	TV Tokyo	Dual role
2008	Bara no nai Hanaya		Fuji TV	Episode 9
2008	Kimi Hannin janai yo ne?	Shemale	TV Asahi	Episode 2
2008	Seiichi Morimura Suspense: Toki	Hiroshi Sonada	TBS	
2008	Koiuta Drama SP: Genki o Dashite	Maurice Yamada	TBS	
2008	Men-dol: Ikemen Idol	Kokorozashiai Hatori	TV Tokyo	
2008	Room Of King	Noboru Hotta	Fuji TV	
2009	Anmitsu Hime	Hiruton Tomoe Nikkei	Fuji TV	
2009	Senryoku-gai Tsūkoku	Hello Work staff	WOWOW	
2009	Onna Taxi Driver no Jiken Nisshi		TBS	
2009	Uta no onīsan	Kazuhiro Sumiyoshi	TV Asahi	Regular
2009	Yusuke Kamiji no genki no deru Koi	Etsuko Master	Bee TV	
2009	Keishichō Minamidaira Han: Shichinin no Keiji	Kenji Tomii	TBS	
2009	Kochira Katsushika-ku Kameari Kōen-mae Hashutsujo	Bus Jack offender	TBS	
2009	Otokomae! 2	Kami Shuzō	NHK-G	
2009	Ijin no Kuru Heya	Michinaga Fujiwara	Tokyo MX	Episode 9
2009	Mito Kōmon Chapter 40	Tomekichi	TBS	Episode 20
2010	Onna Keiji Otomichi Takako Kogoerukiba	Yumeka	TV Asahi	
2010	Mattsugu: Kamakura Kashi Torimono Hikae	Getanuki	NHK-G	Regular
2010	Daimajin Kanon	Tamekichi	TV Tokyo	
2010	Shōfu to Shukujo	Brothel customer	THK	Episode 44
2010	Tokyo Eki o Wasuremono Azukari-sho	Yukio Kitaguchi	TV Asahi	
2011	Urakara	Tsutomu Uesugi	TV Tokyo	Episode 10
2011	Gō	Yūki Hideyasu	NHK-G	
2011	Last Money: Ai no Nedan	Yoshio Isogai	NHK-G	Episode 3
2012	Kagi no kakatta Heya	Kawasaki	Fuji TV	Episode 1
2012	Resident – 5-nin no Kenshui	Tsuruko	TBS	Episode 4
2013	Hōkago Groove	Tsuyoshi Mori	TBS	Episode 3
2013	Dandarin: Rōdō Kijun Kantoku-kan	Kitagawa	NTV	Episode 6
2013	Yorozu Uranai Sho: Onmyō-ya e yōkoso	Ando	KTV	Episode 8
2014	Saigo Kara Nibanme no Koi		Fuji TV	Episode 7
2014	Onna wa sore o Yurusanai	John	TBS	Episode 8
2015	Garo: Gold Storm Sho	Gerril	TV Tokyo	Episode 12

=== Anime television ===
Year	Title	Role	Network	Notes	Ref.
2006	Digimon Data Squad	Gotsumon	Fuji TV		
2009	Fresh Pretty Cure!	Kaoru-chan	ABC	(Note: Real name is Kaoru Tachibana.)Also did the choreography at the ending theme	

=== Advertisements ===
Year	Title
2007	Suntory Vitamin Water
2007	Tsuchzaki BC "Happy Cute na Kibun de, Tanoshiku asobo."

=== Films ===
Year	Title	Role
2008	Nagai Nagai Satsujin	Ryuichi Morimoto
2008	Natsuyasumi no Yōna 1-kagetsu	Bartender
2008	Komori Seikatsu Kojo Club	Tsuji
2009	The Ramen Girl	Harumi
2009	20 Seiki Shōnen Dai 2-shō: Saigo no Kibō	Mariah
2009	Subaru	Sada
2009	Katen no Shiro	Tomekichi
2009	Kyō kara Hitman	Kamio
2009	Inubaka: Crazy for Dogs	Ajuba-hakase
2010	Kanzen naru Shiiku Maid, for you	Otake
2010	Zebraman 2: Attack on Zebra City	Member of Parliament
2010	Sword of Desperation	Kisuke
2010	Saiban-chō! Koko wa Chōeki 4-nen de dō suka	Forest judge
2011	Shōjo-tachi no Rashinban	Goro Mesaki
2011	Gal Basara: Sengoku Jidai wa Kengai Desu	
2012	Miss Boys! Yūjō no Yukue-hen	Romeo
2012	Tane maku Tabibito: Minori no Cha	
2012	Liar Game: Reborn	Tetsuya Murata
2012	Ai to Makoto	Teacher
2012	Rinjō: Gekijō-ban	Tension number policeman

=== Anime films ===
Year	Title	Role
2009	Movie Fresh Pretty Cure! The Kingdom of Toys has Lots of Secrets!?	Kaoru-chan

=== Stage ===
Year	Title
2003	Cinderella Story
2008	High! Miracles

=== Discography ===
As part of Maeken Trance Project

Year	Title	Notes
2005	"Koi no Buchiage Tengoku"	Won the Japan Cable Awards Wired Topic Award and 47th Japan Record Awards Special Award
2006	"Tokyo Chalance"	

=== Videography ===
Year	Title
2008	Furifuri Song Book Best Selection DVD Vol. 1

== Choreography ==
Music

- Fudanjuku (腐男塾)

Year	Title
2008	"Otokozaka"
2009	"Ore no Sora"
2009	"Katsu 'nda!"
2009	"Wotakisuto"
2010	"Muteki! Natsu Yasumi"
2011	"Onaji Jidai ni Uma reta Wakamono-tachi"

- Nakano Fujo Sisters

Year	Title
2010	"Honey Bee"

- Fudanjuku (風男塾)

Year	Title
2011	"Love Spider"
2012	"Kaze Ikki"
2012	"Ame tokidoki Hare nochi Niji"
2013	"Shita o Muite Kaerou"
2013	"Rikishi-Man"
2013	"Dansō Revolution"
2016	"This is Love"

- AAA

Year	Title
2006	"Champagne Gold"

- Naohito Fujiki

Year	Title
2006	"Hey! Friends"

- Yoko Minamino

Year	Title
2005	"Hai kara-san ga Tōru"

TV drama

Year	Title	Notes
2006	Gal Circle	Flip choreography
2007	Juken no Kamisama	Creative dance choreography

Films

Year	Title
2011	Azemichi no Dandy

Anime television

Year	Title	Notes
2009	Fresh Pretty Cure!	Dance supervisor and choreographer, choreographed the first and last ending themes
2010	HeartCatch PreCure!	Choreographed the first and last ending themes
2011	Suite PreCure	Choreographed the first and last ending themes
2012	Smile PreCure!	Choreographed the first and last ending themes

Stage

Year	Title
2008	High! Miracles

Advertisements

2006	Yukiguni moyashi "Yukiguni moyashi no Uta: Mambo" Music video
2009	Nomi Tomo
2009	Kuroneko Yamato Hikkoshi Center

Other television programmes

Year	Title	Network	Ref.
2013	Oh! Taisō 2	OHK	

== Director, screenplays ==
=== Films ===
Year	Title
2011	Soredemo Hana wa Saite iku

== Bibliography ==
Year	Title
2005	Ken Maeda no Koi Chara Shindan
2009	Soredemo Hana wa Saite iku
