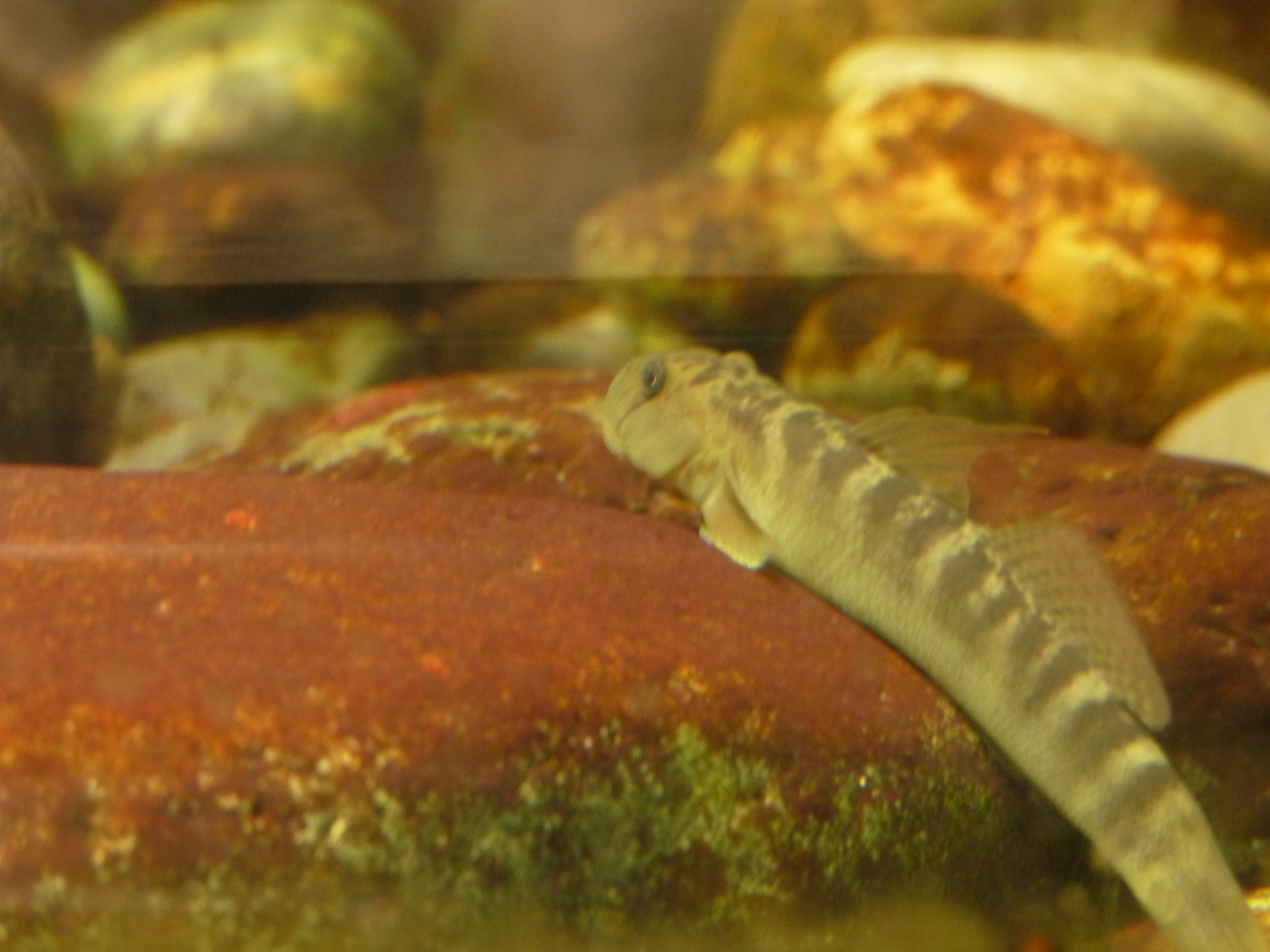
- Sicyopterus japonicus

Scientific classification
- Kingdom: Animalia
- Phylum: Chordata
- Class: Actinopterygii
- Order: Gobiiformes
- Family: Oxudercidae
- Subfamily: Sicydiinae; T. N. Gill, 1860

Genera
- See text

= Sicydiinae =

Subfamily of fishes

The Sicydiinae are a small subfamily (about 118 species) of freshwater gobies, with only nine genera. They are usually found in fast-moving mountain streams in tropical islands. They are characterized by highly developed rounded suction discs and an amphidromous lifecycle. Adult lengths range from 2 to 15 cm (0.79 to 5.91 in). Some species are popular in the aquarium trade. The genera included under Sicydiinae are:

- Akihito Watson, Keith, and Marquet, 2007
- Cotylopus Guichenot, 1863
- Lentipes Günther, 1861
- Parasicydium Risch, 1980
- Sicyopterus Gill, 1860
- Sicyopus Gill, 1863
- Smilosicyopus Watson, 1999
- Stiphodon Weber, 1895
- Sicydium Cuvier & Valenciennes, 1837
