= List of endemic fish of Papua New Guinea =

This is a list of the endemic fish species recorded in Papua New Guinea.

== Species ==
Scientific name	Common name	Family	Habitat	Notes
Cheroscorpaena tridactyla		Apistidae	Marine	
Apogon dammermani		Apogonidae	Marine	May or may not be endemic (FishBase).
Apogon novaeguineae		Apogonidae	Marine	May or may not be endemic (FishBase).
Apogon photogaster		Apogonidae	Marine	
Ecsenius collettei	Collette's blenny	Blenniidae	Marine	
Ecsenius taeniatus		Blenniidae	Marine	
Meiacanthus limbatus		Blenniidae	Marine	
Omobranchus robertsi		Blenniidae	Marine	
Omox lupus		Blenniidae	Marine	May or may not be endemic (FishBase).
Parabrosmolus novaeguineae		Bythitidae	Marine	
Callionymus colini	Tiny New Guinea longtail dragonet	Callionymidae	Marine	
Callionymus zythros		Callionymidae	Marine	
Synchiropus claudiae		Callionymidae	Marine	May or may not be endemic (FishBase).
Trimma rubromaculatus		Gobiidae	Marine	May or may not be endemic (FishBase).
Vanderhorstia flavilineata		Gobiidae	Marine	
Cirrhilabrus condei		Labridae	Marine	
Hoplolatilus pohle		Malacanthidae	Marine	
Moringua penni	Penn's thrush eel	Moringuidae	Marine	May or may not be endemic (FishBase).
Callechelys papulosa		Ophichthidae	Marine	May or may not be endemic (FishBase).
Stalix dicra		Opistognathidae	Marine	
Stalix eremia		Opistognathidae	Marine	
Nematops microstoma	Small-mouth righteye flounder	Pleuronectidae	Marine	May or may not be endemic (FishBase).
Chrysiptera cymatilis		Pomacentridae	Marine	
Chrysiptera niger	Black damselfish	Pomacentridae	Marine	May or may not be endemic (FishBase).
Chrysiptera sinclairi	Sinclair's damselfish	Pomacentridae	Marine	May or may not be endemic (FishBase).
Neopomacentrus aquadulcis		Pomacentridae	Marine	
Pomacentrus albimaculus	Whitespot damsel	Pomacentridae	Marine	May or may not be endemic (FishBase).
Pomacentrus colini	Colin's damsel	Pomacentridae	Marine	
Pseudochromis ephippiatus		Pseudochromidae	Marine	
Pseudochromis marginatus		Pseudochromidae	Marine	
Pseudomugil majusculus	Cape blue-eye	Pseudomugilidae	Marine	
Atrobucca adusta	Scorched croaker	Sciaenidae	Marine	
Liopropoma incomptum		Serranidae	Marine	
Rabaulichthys altipinnis	Sailfin anthias	Serranidae	Marine	May or may not be endemic (FishBase).
Aseraggodes persimilis	Ocellated sole	Soleidae	Marine	
Brachirus dicholepis		Soleidae	Marine	
Gogolia filewoodi	Sailback houndshark	Triakidae	Marine	
Urolophus armatus	New Ireland stingaree	Urolophidae	Marine	
Rhabdoblennius papuensis		Blenniidae	Marine	
Ungusurculus collettei		Bythitidae	Marine	
Lepadicyathus mendeleevi		gobiesocidae	Marine	
Amblyeleotris neumanni		Gobiidae	Marine	
Ctenogobiops phaeostictus		Gobiidae	Marine	
Tryssogobius quinquespinus		Gobiidae	Marine	
Vanderhorstia belloides		Gobiidae	Marine	
Parapercis vittafrons		Pinguipedidae	Marine	
Chaetodontoplus vanderloosi		Pomacanthidae	Marine	
Ptereleotris crossogenion		Ptereleotridae	Marine	
Aseraggodes chapleaui		Soleidae	Marine	
Tetracentrum apogonoides	Four-spined glass perchlet	Ambassidae	Freshwater	
Tetracentrum caudovittatus	Kokoda glass perchlet	Ambassidae	Freshwater	
Tetracentrum honessi	Honess' glass perchlet	Ambassidae	Freshwater	
Glossamia abo		Apogonidae	Freshwater	
Glossamia narindica	Slender mouth almighty	Apogonidae	Freshwater	
Brustiarius nox	Comb-gilled catfish	Ariidae	Freshwater	
Cochlefelis danielsi	Daniel's catfish	Ariidae	Freshwater	
Nemapteryx augusta	Short-barbelled catfish	Ariidae	Freshwater	
Neoarius coatesi	Coates' catfish	Ariidae	Freshwater	
Neoarius taylori	Taylor's catfish	Ariidae	Freshwater	
Pachyula crassilabris	Thick-lipped catfish	Ariidae	Freshwater	
Craterocephalus kailolae	Kailola's hardyhead	Atherinidae	Freshwater	
Craterocephalus lacustris	Kutubu freshwater hardyhead	Atherinidae	Freshwater	
Craterocephalus pimatuae	Pima hardyhead	Atherinidae	Freshwater	
Allomogurnda flavimarginata		Eleotridae	Freshwater	
Allomogurnda hoesei		Eleotridae	Freshwater	
Allomogurnda insularis		Eleotridae	Freshwater	
Allomogurnda landfordi		Eleotridae	Freshwater	
Allomogurnda montana		Eleotridae	Freshwater	
Allomogurnda papua		Eleotridae	Freshwater	
Eleotris aquadulcis	Freshwater gudgeon	Eleotridae	Freshwater	
Mogurnda furva	Black mogurnda	Eleotridae	Freshwater	
Mogurnda kutubuensis	Lake Kutuba mogurnda	Eleotridae	Freshwater	
Mogurnda lineata	Kokoda mogurnda	Eleotridae	Freshwater	
Mogurnda maccuneae		Eleotridae	Freshwater	
Mogurnda malsmithi		Eleotridae	Freshwater	
Mogurnda mosa	Mosa mogurnda	Eleotridae	Freshwater	
Mogurnda orientalis	Eastern mogurnda	Eleotridae	Freshwater	
Mogurnda pulchra	Moresby mogurnda	Eleotridae	Freshwater	
Mogurnda spilota	Blotched mogurnda	Eleotridae	Freshwater	
Mogurnda variegata	Variegated gudgeon	Eleotridae	Freshwater	
Mogurnda vitta	Striped mogurnda	Eleotridae	Freshwater	
Oxyeleotris caeca		Eleotridae	Freshwater	
Tateurndina ocellicauda	Peacock gudgeon	Eleotridae	Freshwater	
Thryssa rastrosa	Fly River thryssa	Engraulidae	Freshwater	
Boleophthalmus poti		Gobiidae	Freshwater	
Glossogobius asaro		Gobiidae	Freshwater	
Glossogobius coatesi	Coates' goby	Gobiidae	Freshwater	
Glossogobius macrocephalus		Gobiidae	Freshwater	
Glossogobius multipapillus		Gobiidae	Freshwater	
Glossogobius muscorum		Gobiidae	Freshwater	
Glossogobius torrentis	White water goby	Gobiidae	Freshwater	
Gymnoamblyopus novaeguineae		Gobiidae	Freshwater	
Lentipes watsoni		Gobiidae	Freshwater	
Mugilogobius fusculus	Obscure goby	Gobiidae	Freshwater	
Sicyopterus ocellaris		Gobiidae	Freshwater	
Stenogobius alleni		Gobiidae	Freshwater	
Stenogobius watsoni		Gobiidae	Freshwater	
Stiphodon larson		Gobiidae	Freshwater	
Chilatherina axelrodi	Axelrod's rainbowfish	Melanotaeniidae	Freshwater	
Chilatherina bulolo	Bulolo rainbowfish	Melanotaeniidae	Freshwater	
Chilatherina campsi	Highland rainbowfish	Melanotaeniidae	Freshwater	
Chilatherina pagwiensis	Pagwi rainbowfish	Melanotaeniidae	Freshwater	
Glossolepis kabia	Sepik rainbowfish	Melanotaeniidae	Freshwater	
Glossolepis maculosus	Spotted rainbowfish	Melanotaeniidae	Freshwater	
Glossolepis ramuensis	Ramu rainbowfish	Melanotaeniidae	Freshwater	
Glossolepis wanamensis	Lake Wanam rainbowfish	Melanotaeniidae	Freshwater	
Melanotaenia caerulea	Blue rainbowfish	Melanotaeniidae	Freshwater	
Melanotaenia herbertaxelrodi	Lake Tebera rainbowfish	Melanotaeniidae	Freshwater	
Melanotaenia iris	Strickland rainbowfish	Melanotaeniidae	Freshwater	
Melanotaenia lacustris	Lake Kutubu rainbowfish	Melanotaeniidae	Freshwater	
Melanotaenia monticola	Mountain rainbowfish	Melanotaeniidae	Freshwater	
Melanotaenia mubiensis	Mubi rainbowfish	Melanotaeniidae	Freshwater	
Melanotaenia oktediensis	Oktedi rainbowfish	Melanotaeniidae	Freshwater	
Melanotaenia papuae	Papuan rainbowfish	Melanotaeniidae	Freshwater	
Melanotaenia parkinsoni	Parkinson's rainbowfish	Melanotaeniidae	Freshwater	
Melanotaenia pimaensis	Pima River rainbowfish	Melanotaeniidae	Freshwater	
Melanotaenia sexlineata	Fly River rainbowfish	Melanotaeniidae	Freshwater	
Melanotaenia sylvatica	Forest rainbowfish	Melanotaeniidae	Freshwater	
Neosilurus coatesi		Plotosidae	Freshwater	
Neosilurus gjellerupi	Northern tandan	Plotosidae	Freshwater	
Oloplotosus luteus	Pale yellow tandan	Plotosidae	Freshwater	
Oloplotosus torobo	Kutubu tandan	Plotosidae	Freshwater	
Kiunga ballochi	Glass blue-eye	Pseudomugilidae	Freshwater	
Kiunga bleheri	Bleher's blue-eye	Pseudomugilidae	Freshwater	
Popondichthys furcatus	Forktail blue-eye	Pseudomugilidae	Freshwater	
Pseudomugil connieae	Popondetta blue-eye	Pseudomugilidae	Freshwater	
Pseudomugil majusculus	Cape blue-eye	Pseudomugilidae	Freshwater	
Leptachirus bensbach	Bensbach River sole	Soleidae	Freshwater	
Leptachirus kikori	Kikori River sole	Soleidae	Freshwater	
Leptachirus robertsi	Robert's sole	Soleidae	Freshwater	
Microphis spinachioides	Spinach pipefish	Syngnathidae	Freshwater	
Amniataba affinis	Tiger grunter	Terapontidae	Freshwater	
Hephaestus adamsoni	Adamson's grunter	Terapontidae	Freshwater	
Hephaestus komaensis		Terapontidae	Freshwater	
Hephaestus raymondi	Raymond's grunter	Terapontidae	Freshwater	
Hephaestus trimaculatus	Threespot grunter	Terapontidae	Freshwater	
Zenarchopterus robertsi	Robert's river garfish	Zenarchopteridae	Freshwater	

== See also ==
- Fauna of New Guinea
- List of endemic amphibians of Papua New Guinea
- List of endemic reptiles of Papua New Guinea
- List of birds of Papua New Guinea
- List of butterflies of Papua New Guinea
- List of mammals of Papua New Guinea
