= Running River rainbowfish =

Scientific classification
- Kingdom: Animalia
- Phylum: Chordata
- Class: Actinopterygii
- Division: Teleostei
- Order: Atheriniformes
- Family: Melanotaeniidae
- Genus: Melanotaenia
- Species: M. sp.

Binomial name
- Melanotaenia sp.

Undescribed species of fish

The Running River rainbowfish (Melanotaenia sp., also known as the Burdekin rainbowfish, Hidden Valley rainbowfish or zig zag rainbowfish) is an undescribed species of rainbowfish found only in freshwater, specifically, Running River, part of the Burdekin River catchment in northern Queensland, Australia. The species used to be included with the Melanotaenia splendida splendida (eastern rainbowfish) but has since been deemed genetically distinct. The species was first documented in 1981. Running River rainbowfish thrive in warm waters with moderate flows. They prefer areas with rocky substrates and lots of riparian vegetation.

It is common for Running River rainbowfish to be kept as aquarium pets due to their small size and ease of care.

== Characteristics ==
A yellow/green fish with red fins. They have a yellow midlateral stripe, and narrow black stripes creating a zigzag pattern along the lower side of the fish. The males have an iridescent strip running from the mouth to up and over the ridge of the fish's back and ends at the dorsal fin. Males often have brighter colors for more advantageous mating, while females have more dull coloration. Their body is elongated, and has a laterally compressed body form. They have two dorsal fins, the first with 3–7 spines and the second with 7–22 soft rays. Their anal fin is composed of 1 spine and 15–28 soft rays. They have a rounded caudal fin and pectoral fins that aid in precise swimming. They have cycloid scales covering their body, with approximately 29–40 vertical scale rows. They have a small terminal mouth, perfect for feeding at the surface.

Running River rainbowfish are social fish often found in schools of six or more. They have an omnivorous diet and often feed on shrimp, bloodworms, Daphnia, and riparian vegetation.

== Taxonomy ==
Although discovered in 1982 by Ray Leggett, the species was never formally described as its taxonomy was unclear. However, genetic analysis supports the Running River rainbowfish as a distinct species, rather than a colour variety of the eastern rainbowfish. DNA studies, including single nucleotide polymorphism (SNP) genotyping of historical and current samples, established its phylogenetic independence. Showing no close genetic relation to other rainbowfishes in the Burdekin River basin. Their taxonomic placement places them among the ray-finned fishes, specifically within the diverse family of rainbowfishes endemic to freshwaters of Australia and New Guinea. Within the genus Melanotaenia (including 89 defined species) the Running River rainbowfish is within a unique lineage in the Australis clade.

== Reproduction ==
There is little information known on spawning in the wild, however there is some information on breeding in captivity. Like most rainbow fish, external fertilization on adhesive eggs is the mode of reproduction. The mean clutch size, hatch time, and egg size for the Running River rainbowfish are unknown. Sexually mature individuals are typically around 3 cm in total length. The hatched fish usually reach the fry stage around 30-40 days after hatching and reach full juvenile status around 6 months. The Running River rainbowfish reaches maturity at around one year old.

Ideal spawning conditions include low flow and warm temperatures (typically seen in other Queensland Melanotaenia species as well).

== Conservation ==
In the wild, the Running River rainbowfish is confined to a 13 km stretch of Running River (a tributary of the Burdekin River), isolated between two gorges. Large waterfalls that the fish cannot swim up also prevent the Running River rainbowfish from moving location. In August 2015, ecologists Peter Unmack and Michael Hammer discovered that large numbers of eastern rainbowfish had been introduced into the upper section of Running River, and were hybridising and introgressing with the Running River rainbowfish. Due to this hybridisation threat, the Australian Society for Fish Biology listed the Running River rainbowfish as critically endangered in September 2016.The classification was based on the IUCN criteria, but cannot be federally listed due to not yet being described.

Due to the fish's popularity among aquarium owners, clubs and enthusiasts were able to raise $12,000. That money was spent to go on trips to collect the 207 remaining wild Running rainbowfish to breed in captivity for eventual release back into the wild. Some of the collection methods included snorkeling and hand-netting.

In August 2015, researchers from the University of Canberra and James Cook University began a captive breeding program using 'pure' Running River rainbowfish captured from the wild. By September 2016, they had bred 3,000 to 4,000 individuals. These captive-bred fish are being released into two nearby tributaries, Deception Creek and Puzzle Creek, at the Mount Zero-Taravale Wildlife Sanctuary, beginning in November 2016. The fish were protected by natural barriers including waterfalls to prevent other spices from entering the area and changing the genetics again. Monitoring was continued for two years after the initial release to ensure the population moved into available habitat and remained stable.

As of 2023 the captive breeding program has been declared a success with approximately 18 km of habitat being added to their range. There are now thriving captive populations in Australian Wildlife Conservancy (AWC)’s Mount Zero-Taravale Wildlife Sanctuary (Gugu Badhun country).The fish have since continued their wild reproduction and have numbers in the tens of thousands. The fish are still considered critically endangered in Queensland and Australia records.
