= Mayland's rainbowfish =

Conservation status
- Vulnerable (IUCN 3.1)

Scientific classification
- Kingdom: Animalia
- Phylum: Chordata
- Class: Actinopterygii
- Order: Atheriniformes
- Family: Melanotaeniidae
- Genus: Melanotaenia
- Species: M. maylandi

Binomial name
- Melanotaenia maylandi G. R. Allen, 1983

Species of fish

Mayland's rainbowfish (Melanotaenia maylandi) is a species of rainbowfish in the subfamily Melanotaeniinae. It is endemic to West Papua in Indonesia, where it is known only from a small stream a few km east of Danau Bira.
