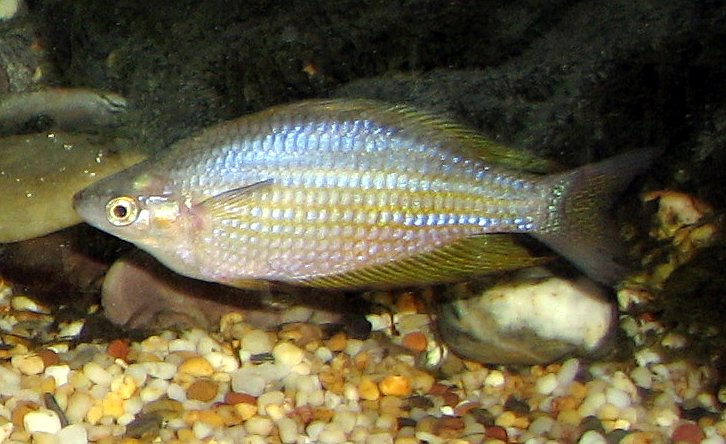

Scientific classification
- Domain: Eukaryota
- Kingdom: Animalia
- Phylum: Chordata
- Class: Actinopterygii
- Order: Atheriniformes
- Family: Melanotaeniidae
- Genus: Melanotaenia
- Species: M. splendida

Binomial name
- Melanotaenia splendida (W. K. H. Peters, 1866)

Synonyms
- Aida inornata Castelnau, 1875; Aristeus cavifrons Macleay, 1882; Nematocentris tatei Zietz, 1896; Aidaprora carteri Whitley, 1935

= Melanotaenia splendida =

Species of fish

Melanotaenia splendida, the Eastern rainbowfish, is a species of rainbowfish from the subfamily Melanotaeniinae which is found in Australia.

== Taxonomy ==
Melanotaenia splendida is highly variable and although three subspecies have been recognised these have been found to show a wide variety of morphology within each subspecies. These differences are obvious in colouration and in the depth of the body.

The three commonly recognised subspecies are:

- Melanotaenia splendida inornata (Castelnau 1875) - chequered rainbowfish
- Melanotaenia splendida splendida (Peters 1866) - eastern rainbowfish
- Melanotaenia splendida tatei (Zietz 1896) - desert rainbowfish

== Distribution ==
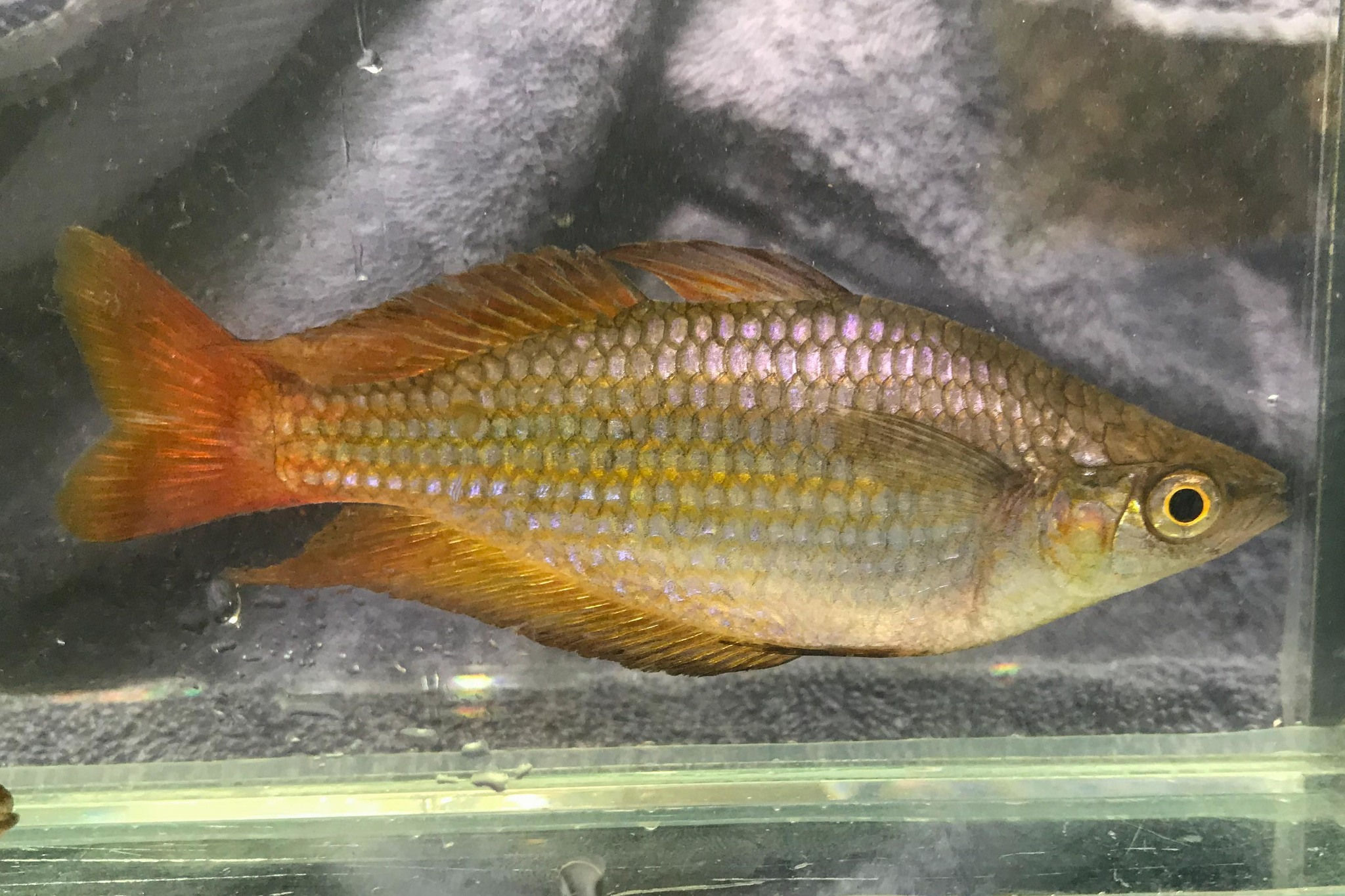
M. s. splendida in Queensland.

The chequered rainbowfish (M. s. inornata) is found in northern Australia from the Mary River east to the Cape York Peninsula and south to the Jardine River, it is also found on some of the Torres Strait Islands.

The eastern rainbowfish (M. s. splendida) occurs in rivers east of the Great Dividing Range from the Torres Strait Islands and the Cape York Peninsula south to the Dawson River in Queensland.

The desert rainbowfish (M. s. tatei) is endemic to the drainage basin of Lake Eyre.

== Habitat and biology ==
Melanotaenia splendida are normally found close to the surface of the deeper pools in small freshwater streams, they also occur in lakes and reservoirs. These fishes are frequently recorded in large schools and these can be found in water varying from clear to turbid and which may or may not have extensive vegetation. M. splendida is an omnivore which feeds on filamentous algae, aquatic and terrestrial insects, small crustaceans and other small invertebrates. Like other rainbowfish, this species shows sexual dimorphism. Breeding takes place year round and the male and female fish form pairs in which the females releases the eggs and the male fertilises them. 60-70 eggs are laid at each spawning and the golden coloured, round eggs attach to submerged vegetation with an adhesive filament. The larvae hatch after around a week and are around 4mm long and they have a reduced yolk sac and fully formed mouth and pectoral fins. The larvae start to feed after 24 hours.
