= Ogilby's rainbowfish =

Conservation status
- Vulnerable (IUCN 3.1)

Scientific classification
- Kingdom: Animalia
- Phylum: Chordata
- Class: Actinopterygii
- Order: Atheriniformes
- Family: Melanotaeniidae
- Genus: Melanotaenia
- Species: M. ogilbyi

Binomial name
- Melanotaenia ogilbyi M. C. W. Weber, 1910

Species of fish

Ogilby's rainbowfish (Melanotaenia ogilbyi) is a species of rainbowfish in the subfamily Melanotaeniinae. It is endemic to West Papua in Indonesia in the Lorentz River system. This species was described in 1910 by Max C.W. Weber from types collected in the Noord-Fluss ("North River"), now renamed the Lorentz River, by the Dutch explorer Hendrikus Albertus Lorentz in 1907, it was not recorded again until Gerald R. Allen collected more specimens in 1995 and the species was later introduced to the aquarium hobby. Its specific name honours the ichthyologist James Douglas Ogilby (1853-1925).
