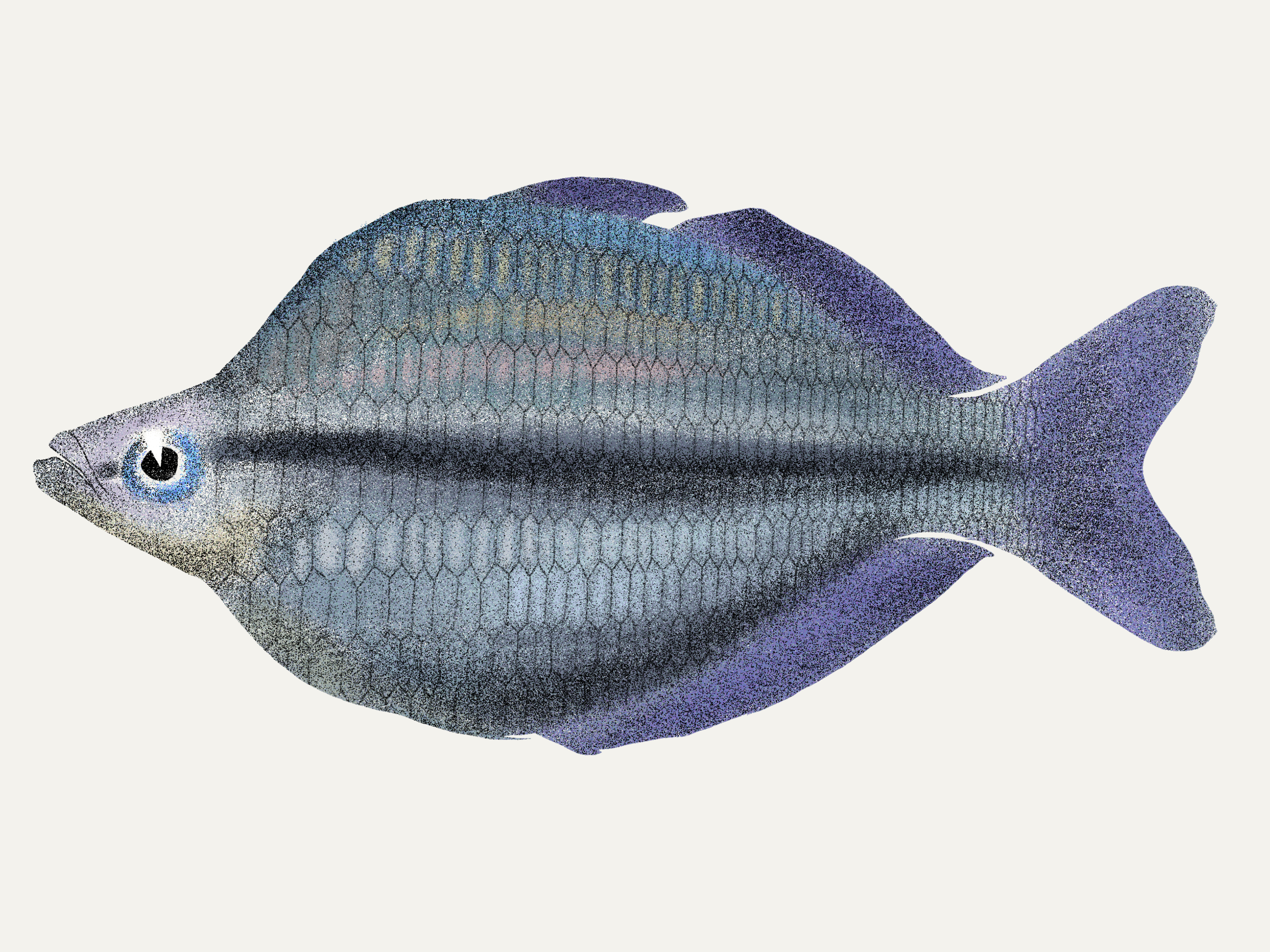

Conservation status
- Least Concern (IUCN 3.1)

Scientific classification
- Kingdom: Animalia
- Phylum: Chordata
- Class: Actinopterygii
- Division: Teleostei
- Order: Atheriniformes
- Family: Melanotaeniidae
- Genus: Melanotaenia
- Species: M. kamaka

Binomial name
- Melanotaenia kamaka (G. R. Allen & Renyaan , 1996)

= Melanotaenia kamaka =

Species of fish

Melanotaenia kamaka, the Kamaka rainbowfish is a species of rainbowfish in the subfamily Melanotaeniinae. It endemic to southwest New Guinea, specifically lake Kamakawaiar of which it earns its name.

== Introduction ==
M. kamaka is a rare fish endemic to the Lake Kamakawaiar in the southeastern region of West Papua, Indonesia. Aside from its highly restricted range, this species faces no threats in its remote home

It is a recent discovery, only being described in 1996, and is an aquarium fish noted for its unique blue colouration and manageable size.

== Description ==
Both genders of this species boast a distinct steel-blue appearance. The scales of this fish are outlined with a darker shade, further emphasising the colours of this loveable fish. The pectoral fins are nearly transparent, whilst the tail, dorsal fin, and pelvic fins are a powder-blue with a purple-ish tint. The lateral scales are adorned with a thick, very dark band of navy blue. Females tend to have a slightly greyed out pattern. Males, upon maturity, attain a disc-like, almost circular appearance.

== In the aquarium ==
This species adapts well to captivity, and is a social fish that needs members of its own species to feel safe. Much like other rainbowfish, the kamaka will exhibit active feeding behaviour and is prone to jumping out of the tank.
