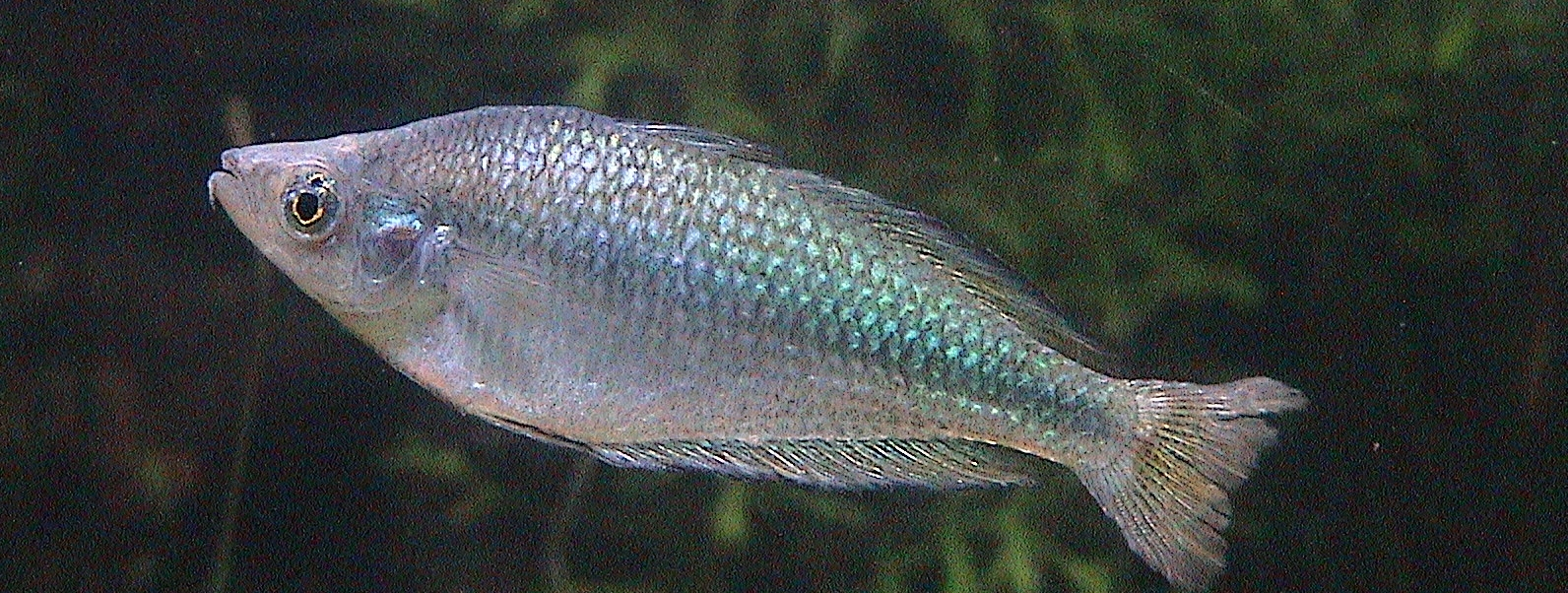

Conservation status
- Least Concern (IUCN 3.1)

Scientific classification
- Kingdom: Animalia
- Phylum: Chordata
- Class: Actinopterygii
- Order: Atheriniformes
- Family: Melanotaeniidae
- Genus: Melanotaenia
- Species: M. fluviatilis

Binomial name
- Melanotaenia fluviatilis (Castelnau, 1878)

Synonyms
- Aristeus fluviatilis; Melanotaenia splendida fluviatilis; Nematocentris fluviatilis

= Murray River rainbowfish =

Species of fish

The Murray River rainbowfish (Melanotaenia fluviatilis), known less commonly as the Australian rainbowfish, is a species of freshwater fish endemic to southeastern Australia. The southernmost species of all rainbowfishes, these fish are very colourful, hence the name; and there is sexual dimorphism with the males being larger and more colourful than females. Murray River rainbowfish are schooling fish and will congregate near logs or riverbanks, and are a popular aquarium fish.

== Taxonomy ==
Melanotaenia fluviatilis was originally described by François de Laporte de Castelnau as Aristeus fluviatilis. M. fluviatilis was formerly considered a synonym of the closely related crimson-spotted rainbowfish (M. duboulayi). Authors recognised M. duboulayi and M. fluviatilis either as a single species or separate subspecies, or even as two subspecies of eastern rainbowfish (M. splendida). Despite the many similarities between M. duboulayi and M. fluviatilis, they were recognised as separate species in 1986 because of genetic, morphometric, and meristic differences.

== Description ==
Murray River rainbowfish reach maximum body lengths of 11 cm (4.3 in), but the males are usually no larger than 8.5 cm (3.3 in), while the females usually only grow to 7 cm (2.8 in). The body is elongated, with a small head and large eyes. Murray River rainbowfish have two dorsal fins and a pointed anal fin, and the caudal (tail) fin is forked shallowly. The fins (excluding the caudal fin) are yellow with dark margins and orange or red markings.

As with other rainbowfishes, Murray River rainbowfish are colourful fish. Their sides are silvery-brown, and have a green or silver sheen. A blue stripe extends from the snout to the caudal fin. The other fins are yellow and marked with orange or red. In males, several orange stripes run laterally across the posterior half of the body. Males have red spots on the dorsal, anal and caudal fins, with a blackish margin when breeding. Females are less intensely coloured, lacking some of the brilliance and red stripes along the caudal peduncle.

== Behaviour ==
Murray River rainbowfish are omnivorous and feed on both aquatic and terrestrial invertebrates and some filamentous algae. In captivity, their diet comprises all kinds of live foods, as well as flake food. They are peaceful in temperament and tend to school around logs and grassy riverbanks.

Breeding is described as "easy" for this species. When in a fish tank, they should be kept in a group of at least six fish. When they get stressed they will try to fin-nip other fish. To be on the safe side, it is best not to keep them with long-finned fish species.

== Distribution and habitat ==
Murray River rainbowfish are native to southeastern Australia in freshwater systems west of the Great Dividing Range, particularly the Murray-Darling basin in New South Wales and southern Queensland. The Campaspe River and Goulburn River in Victoria represent their southern distribution limit.

M. fluviatilis forms schools in slow-flowing rivers, wetlands and billabongs. They are very adaptable and inhabit rivers, creeks, drains, ponds and reservoirs, and occasionally stagnant waterholes. They inhabit water temperature ranges between 22 and 25 °C (72 and 77 °F). As their range is the southernmost of all rainbowfishes, Murray River rainbowfish are the only rainbowfish species adapted to survive the relatively low winter temperatures of 10–15 °C (50–59 °F) in the middle and lower Murray River.
