= Corona rainbowfish =

Conservation status
- Critically endangered, possibly extinct (IUCN 3.1)

Scientific classification
- Kingdom: Animalia
- Phylum: Chordata
- Class: Actinopterygii
- Order: Atheriniformes
- Family: Melanotaeniidae
- Genus: Melanotaenia
- Species: M. corona

Binomial name
- Melanotaenia corona G. R. Allen, 1982

Species of fish

The corona rainbowfish (Melanotaenia corona) is a species of fish in the family Melanotaeniidae. It is endemic to West Papua in Indonesia. Only two specimens of this rainbowfish have ever been collected, both males from the Sermowai River in Irian Jaya, Indonesia, which were collected in 1911 by K. Gjellerup.
