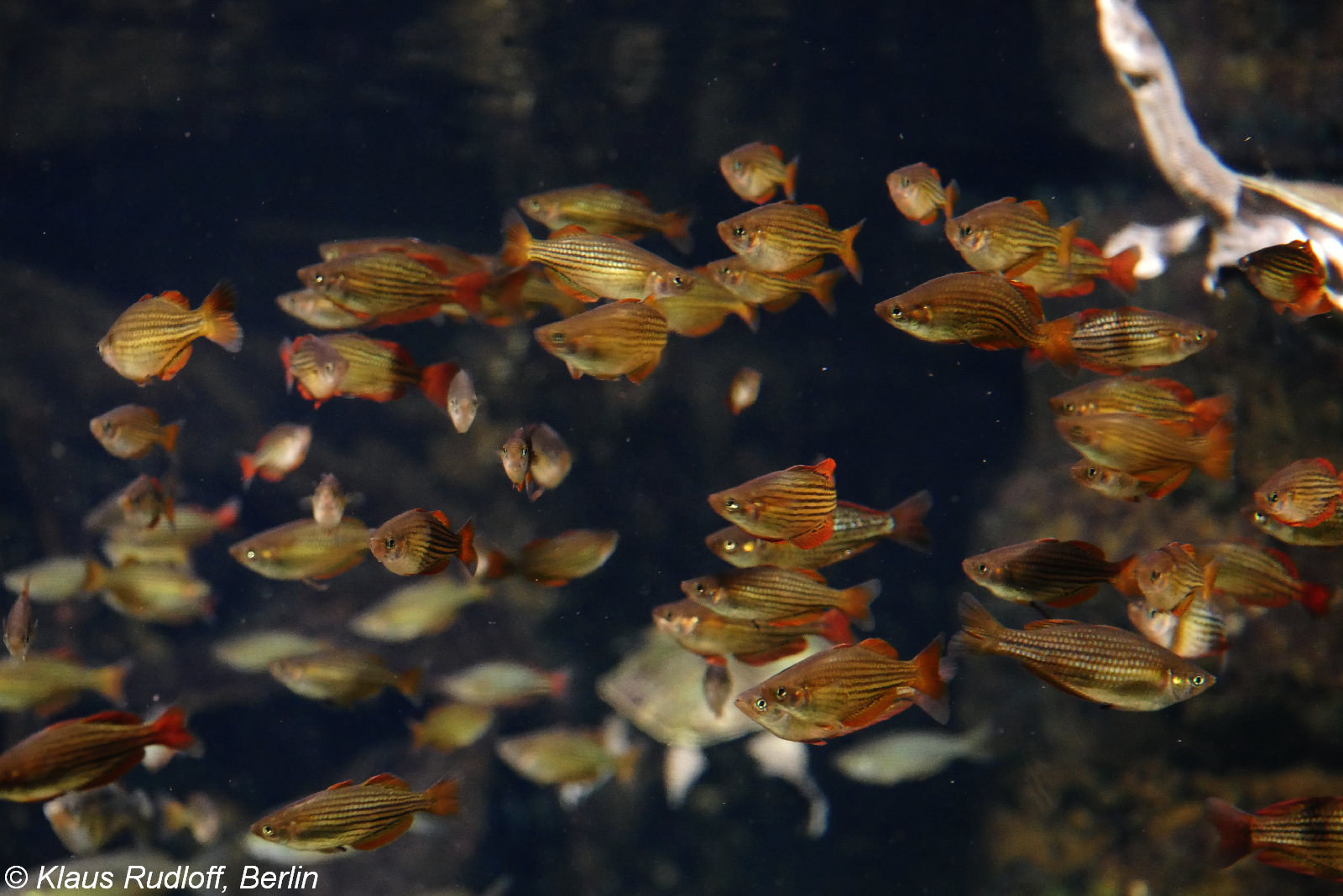

Scientific classification
- Kingdom: Animalia
- Phylum: Chordata
- Class: Actinopterygii
- Division: Teleostei
- Order: Atheriniformes
- Family: Melanotaeniidae
- Genus: Melanotaenia
- Species: M. maccullochi

Binomial name
- Melanotaenia maccullochi Ogilby, 1915

= Melanotaenia maccullochi =

Species of fish

Melanotaenia maccullochi, the dwarf rainbowfish or McCulloch's rainbowfish, is a species of rainbow fish in the family Melanotaeniidae. It was described by James Douglas Ogilby in 1915 when he received two samples from Mr. A. Anderson and the fish was named after the ichthyologist Allan Riverstone McCulloch.

== Habitat ==
Melanotaenia maccullochi lives in swamps, streams and creeks with a pH of about 5.5 to 7. Its preferred water temperature is about 22⁰C to 28⁰C.

== Range ==
Melanotaenia maccullochi lives across Northeastern Australia and Papua New Guinea.

== Captivity ==
Melanotaenia maccullochi is often kept as an aquarium fish. It is fed frozen foods, flakes and granules. They readily breed in captivity.

== Size ==
Melanotaenia maccullochi gets up to about 7.5 cm. However, when they become five months old (the time they reach sexual maturity) they are about 3 cm.

== Dimorphism ==
Melanotaenia maccullochi males are generally more colourful than their female counterparts.

== Diet ==
Melanotaenia maccullochi is an omnivore, feeding on aquatic invertebrates, algae and terrestrial invertebrates.

== Breeding ==
Although not much is known about these fish in the wild, breeding activities have been seen in captivity, where they readily breed. Spawning generally occurs in the early morning, the two fish will press against each other, trembling, and eggs will be deposited among the plants.
