= Exquisite rainbowfish =

Conservation status
- Least Concern (IUCN 3.1)

Scientific classification
- Kingdom: Animalia
- Phylum: Chordata
- Class: Actinopterygii
- Order: Atheriniformes
- Family: Melanotaeniidae
- Genus: Melanotaenia
- Species: M. exquisita

Binomial name
- Melanotaenia exquisita G. R. Allen, 1978

Species of fish

The exquisite rainbowfish (Melanotaenia exquisita) is a species of fish in the family Melanotaeniidae endemic to Australia. It occurs in freshwater habitats of the Northern Territory, typically in running water. It grows to 7.5 cm (3.0 in) standard length.
