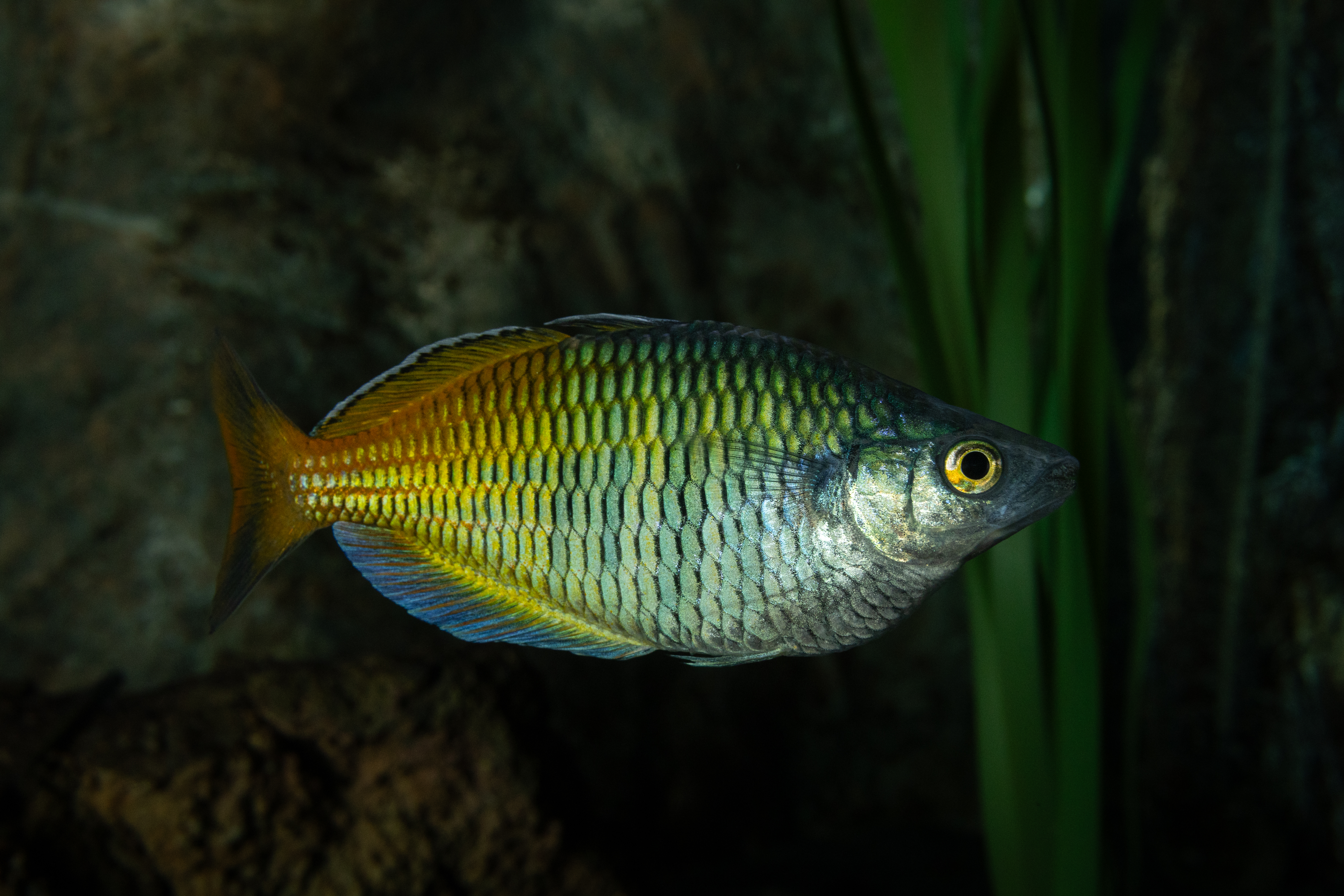
- Male individual

Conservation status
- Endangered (IUCN 3.1)

Scientific classification
- Kingdom: Animalia
- Phylum: Chordata
- Class: Actinopterygii
- Order: Atheriniformes
- Family: Melanotaeniidae
- Genus: Melanotaenia
- Species: M. boesemani

Binomial name
- Melanotaenia boesemani G. R. Allen & N. J. Cross, 1980

= Boeseman's rainbowfish =

Species of fish

Boeseman's rainbowfish (Melanotaenia boesemani), also known as the Boesemani rainbowfish, is a species of fish in the family Melanotaeniidae.

== Geographic range ==
M. boesemani is endemic to the Ayamaru Lakes and their tributaries in a mountainous region of the Bird's Head Peninsula, West Papua, Indonesia.

== Etymology ==
The specific name, boesemani, is in honour of Dutch ichthyologist Marinus Boeseman, the collector of the type specimens.

== In captivity ==
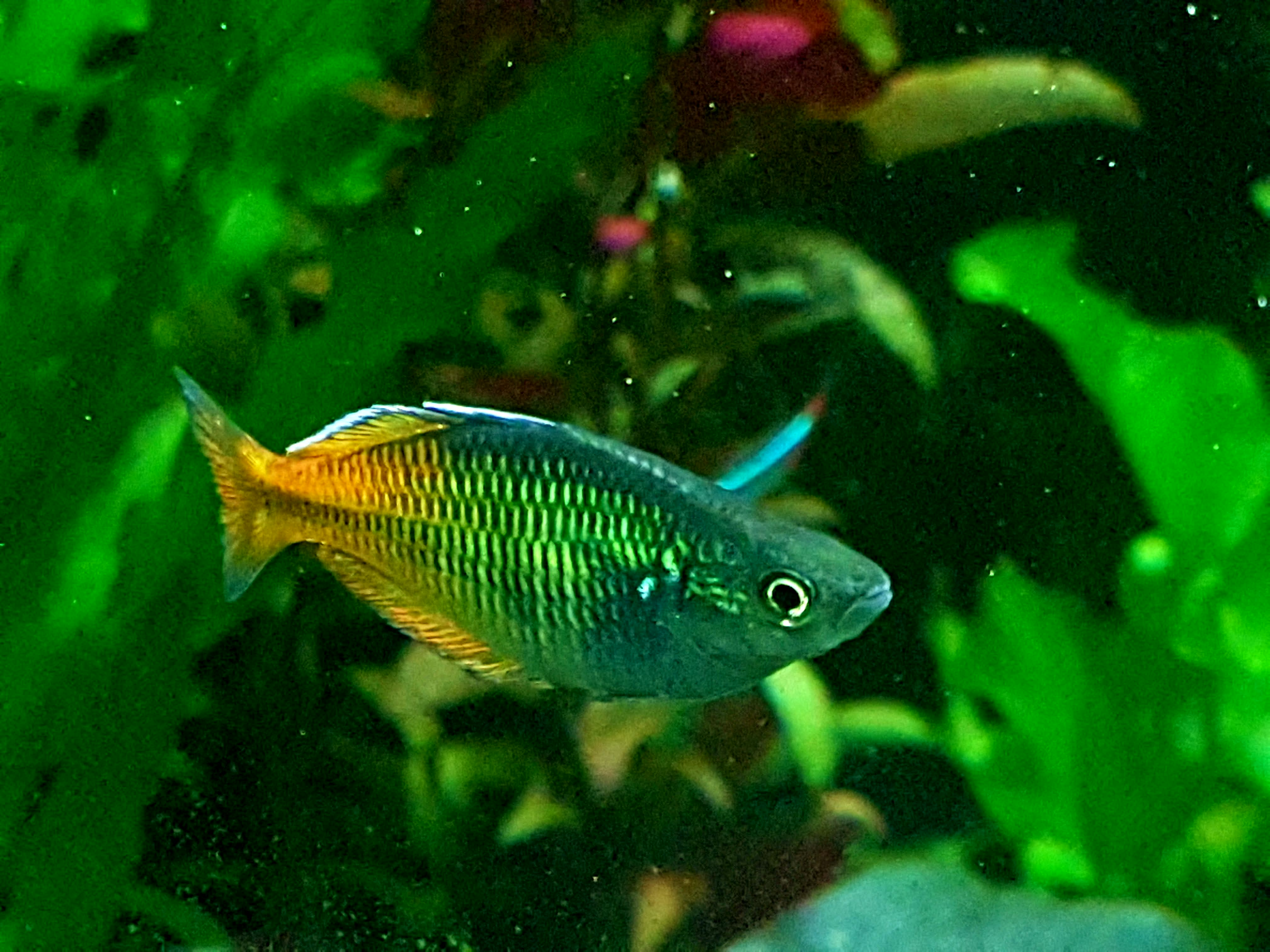
A Boesemani rainbowfish in an aquarium

M. boesemani is also available in the aquarium hobby, where it is prized for its excellent colours and peaceful demeanor. The colour pattern is completely different from most other forms of rainbowfish, as it has a half orange-red rear and a bluish-grey or purple front which in some specimens is almost defined perfectly. M. boesemani will often grow to lengths that exceed 10 cm (3.9 in) if given the right food and water conditions. Like most rainbowfish they are capable of adjusting their color intensity. Their color intensity may be a sign of mood or health. Generally more intense is seen during night time. They are kept best in groups (with as much as or more females than males) due to their community and friendly nature and can be easily kept with many different species of fish, including some tetras. They are a relatively hardy fish that prefer weakly alkaline pH conditions. Good tank mates include other rainbowfish, barbs, tetras, corydoras, snails, gouramis, danios, discus, guppies, swordtails, and loaches. However, smaller freshwater shrimps in the genera Caridina and Neocaridina may be viewed as prey. Ghost shrimp, vampire shrimp, amano shrimp and bamboo shrimp can live with them. Always adult shrimps are added first then baby rainbowfish. Care must be taken to give hiding places for shrimp and open spaces for rainbowfish.

Generally they are very hardy fish but they are prone to columnaris.

=== Diet ===
These omnivores are not picky eaters and will happily eat anything you drop in the tank, but they do prefer meatier foods if given the choice. For optimal health, provide a variety of dry, frozen, and live foods to ensure they get all the essential nutrients and vitamins they need. Rainbowfish have smaller mouths in proportion to their bodies, so feed them appropriate-sized foods—such as krill flakes, dry pellets, frozen bloodworms, daphnia, and brine shrimp.

==== Lifespan ====
Depending on the water temperature in which they are kept, they can live for about 5–8 years on average, although some hobbyists have reportedly kept them alive for up to 13–15 years.
