= Melanotaenia pimaensis =

Conservation status
- Least Concern (IUCN 3.1)

Scientific classification
- Kingdom: Animalia
- Phylum: Chordata
- Class: Actinopterygii
- Order: Atheriniformes
- Family: Melanotaeniidae
- Genus: Melanotaenia
- Species: M. pimaensis

Binomial name
- Melanotaenia pimaensis G. R. Allen, 1981

Species of fish

Melanotaenia pimaensis, the Pima River rainbowfish, is a species of rainbowfish in the subfamily Melanotaeniinae. It is endemic to Papua New Guinea where it has been recorded only from the Pima River where it meets the Tua River in the Southern Highlands.
