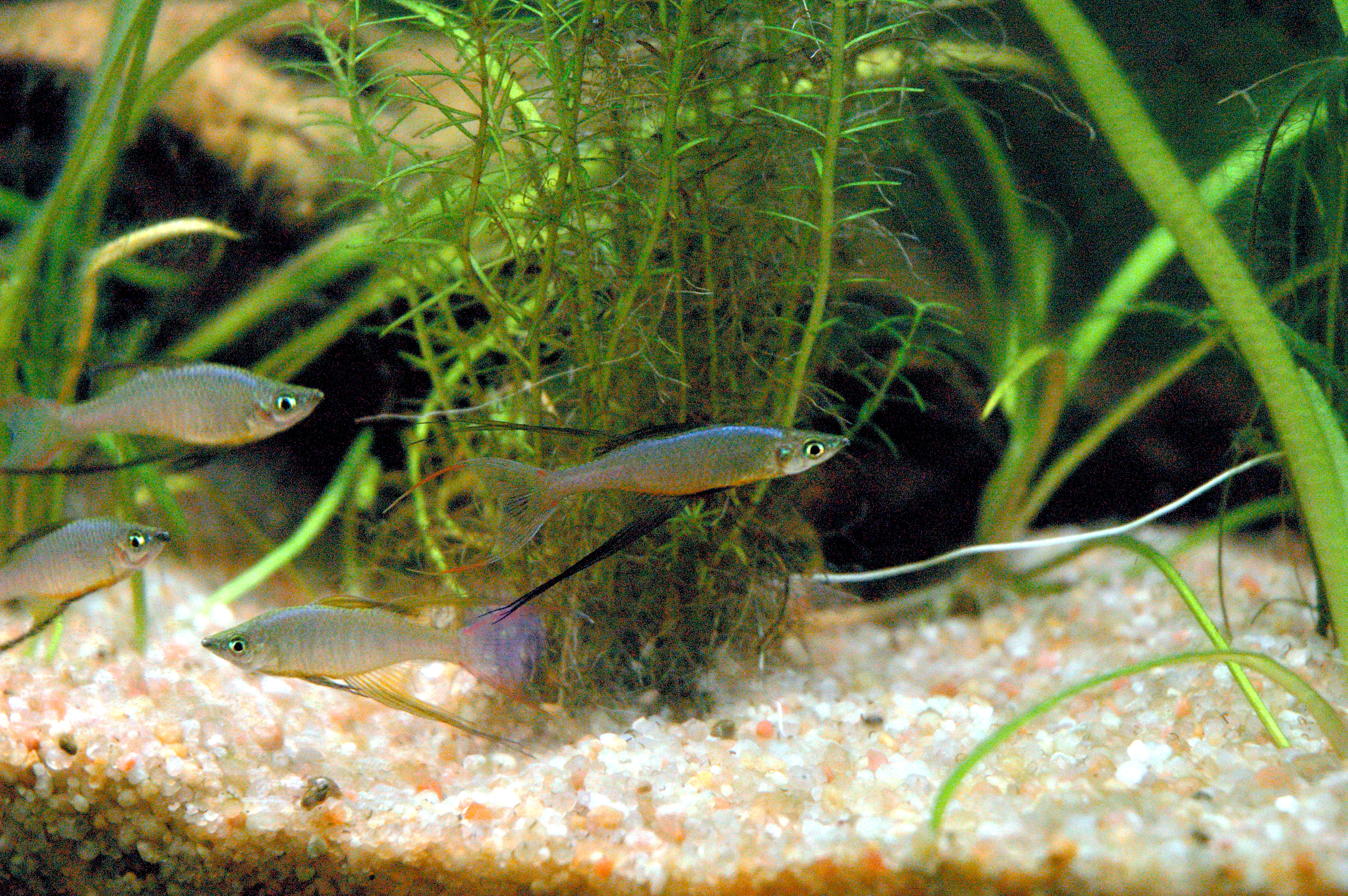

Conservation status
- Least Concern (IUCN 3.1)

Scientific classification
- Kingdom: Animalia
- Phylum: Chordata
- Class: Actinopterygii
- Order: Atheriniformes
- Suborder: Atherinoidei
- Family: Melanotaeniidae
- Genus: Iriatherina; Meinken, 1974
- Species: I. werneri

Binomial name
- Iriatherina werneri Meinken, 1974

= Threadfin rainbowfish =

Species of fish

The threadfin rainbowfish or featherfin rainbowfish (Iriatherina werneri) is a rainbowfish, the only species in the genus Iriatherina. It is characterized by long beautiful fins, and is among the most attractive of the rainbowfishes.

It is native to freshwater swamps and demersal or thickly vegetated areas of flowing waters, in tropical northern Australia and New Guinea.

It grows up to 5 cm (2.0 in) in length, but this does not include the Threadfin's long tail. Sexing is easy by examining fins: males have larger, gaudier finnage than females. Males also have more intense colours. When reproduction takes place eggs are scattered among the leaves of submerged vegetation, and hatch after 7–10 days.

The threadfin rainbowfish was described by Herman Meinkin in 1974 from types collected in Merauke, Irian Jaya, Indonesia. Meinken honoured the German aquarium fish trader Arthur Werner, who collected the type, in the specific name. The generic name is a combination of Iri referring to Irian Jaya and atherina, referring to the silverside genus Atherina as they were thought to be in the same family at the time of naming. Genetic studies have appeared to indicate that there may be significant genetic divergence between the different populations of threadfin rainbowfish that occur parapatrically in northern Queensland and in the Northern Territory which would mean these populations were different species. It is likely that the New Guinea populations will be shown to be third species.

== In the aquarium ==
In aquaria they are usually peaceful, they live preferably in groups of six or more. Because of their long fins they should obviously be kept in a tank without fin-nippers. They breed best in tanks without other species. The male courts the female by posturing in front of her quickly raising then lowering the forward dorsal fin repeatedly. The recommended male-to-female ratio is about 1:3, due to the polygamous behavior of dominant males.

Threadfin rainbowfish do well in aquariums of 20 US gallons (76 L), however 30 US gallons (110 L) is preferred. They are best housed in a "species only" tank; meaning that the tank is reserved for the Threadfins alone. Because of their tiny mouths, they can be difficult to feed. They do well with live foods, such as baby brine shrimp, and the micrometre larval diets.

They prefer water that is soft to moderately hard, slightly acidic (pH 6.0–7.0), and with a temperature of 23–29 °C (73–84 °F).
