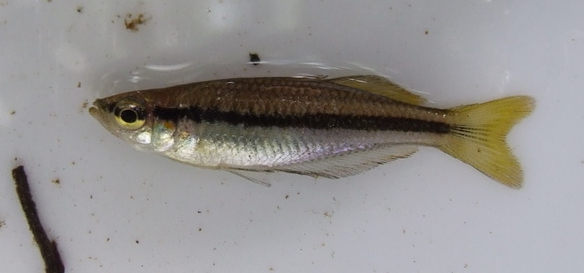

Conservation status
- Least Concern (IUCN 3.1)

Scientific classification
- Kingdom: Animalia
- Phylum: Chordata
- Class: Actinopterygii
- Order: Atheriniformes
- Family: Melanotaeniidae
- Genus: Melanotaenia
- Species: M. nigrans

Binomial name
- Melanotaenia nigrans (Richardson, 1843)

Synonyms
- Atherina nigrans Richardson, 1843

= Black-banded rainbowfish =

Species of fish

The black-banded rainbowfish (Melanotaenia nigrans) is a species of rainbowfish belonging to the subfamily Melanotaeniidae. The species is endemic to Australia. Importantly, the species is the type species of the genus Melanotaenia.

== Distribution ==
The black-banded rainbowfish is found in freshwater rivers and streams across northern Australia. Populations of the species occur on the Cape York Peninsula, in freshwater rivers and streams along the northernmost coast of the Northern Territory and in the eastern Kimberley.

== In the aquarium ==
The black-banded rainbowfish is a popular freshwater aquarium species, especially in Australia. The species favours water temperatures between 23 and 28 °C and acidic pH ranges between 5.5 and 7.
