= Waigeo rainbowfish =

Conservation status
- Least Concern (IUCN 3.1)

Scientific classification
- Kingdom: Animalia
- Phylum: Chordata
- Class: Actinopterygii
- Order: Atheriniformes
- Family: Melanotaeniidae
- Genus: Melanotaenia
- Species: M. catherinae

Binomial name
- Melanotaenia catherinae (de Beaufort, 1910)

Synonyms
- Rhombatractus catherinae de Beaufort, 1910

Species of fish

The Waigeo rainbowfish (Melanotaenia catherinae) is a species of rainbowfish in the subfamily Melanotaeniinae. It is endemic to West Papua in Indonesia. It reaches a maximum length of around 7.5 cm. This species was described as Rhombatractus catherinae in 1910 by Lieven Ferdinand de Beaufort from a type locality which was given as a rivulet flowing into the Rabial River in Waigeo. de Beaufort gave this species the specific name catherinae to honour his wife, Catherine, who had assisted him on the expedition on which the type was collected.
