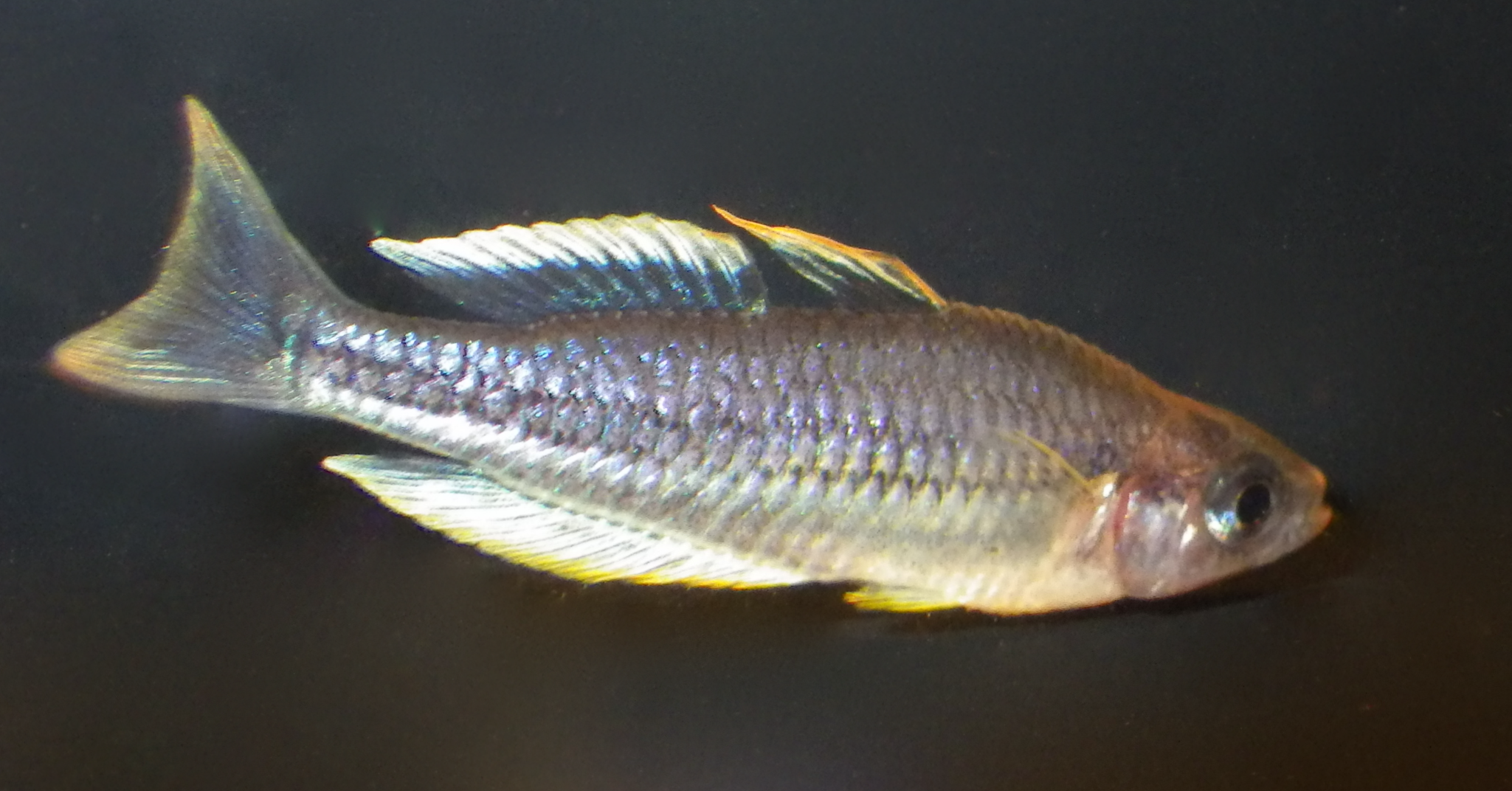

Conservation status
- Vulnerable (IUCN 3.1)

Scientific classification
- Kingdom: Animalia
- Phylum: Chordata
- Class: Actinopterygii
- Order: Atheriniformes
- Family: Melanotaeniidae
- Genus: Melanotaenia
- Species: M. pygmaea

Binomial name
- Melanotaenia pygmaea G. R. Allen, 1978

= Pygmy rainbowfish =

Species of fish

The pygmy rainbowfish (Melanotaenia pygmaea) is a species of rainbowfish in the subfamily Melanotaeniinae. It is endemic to Australia.

== Environment ==
The Melanotaenia pygmaea is recorded to be found in a freshwater environment within a benthopelagic depth range. This species is native to a tropical climate.

== Size ==
The Melanotaenia pygmaea is known to reach the maximum recorded length of about 5.5 centimeters or about 2.1 inches as an unsexed male. A female can reach the maximum recorded length of about 3.5 centimeters or about 1.37 inches. The common length of these species is about 4 centimeters or about 1.57 inches.

== Distribution ==
The Melanotaenia pygmaea is native to the areas of Prince Regent River, West Kimberley district, and northwestern Australia.

== Biology ==
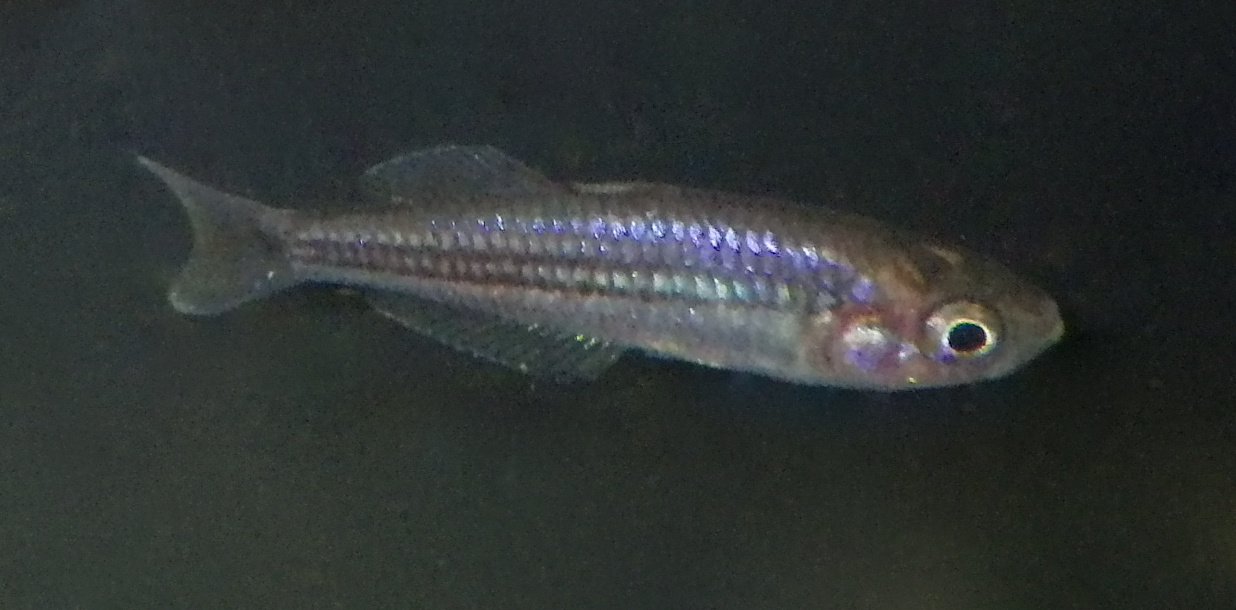
A female pygmy rainbowfish.

The Melanotaenia pygmaea is recorded to be found in fast flowing streams. They tend to occupy the deep pools or bottom of waterfalls in that general area. This species stays in areas that have rocky bottoms and that lack vegetation in the water. The Melanotaenia pygmaea stays in schools of at least 50 individuals on average. This species also does well when kept in an aquarium captivity. The male is considered to have more of a vivid, rainbow color than the females do. This species typically has a blue back with pale, yellow fins. The diet of this species is unknown, but it is assumed that they feed on small insects and vegetation such as algae.
