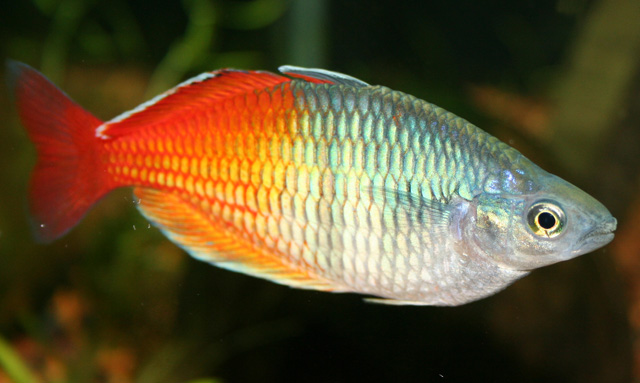
- Melanotaenia boesemani

Scientific classification
- Kingdom: Animalia
- Phylum: Chordata
- Class: Actinopterygii
- Division: Teleostei
- Order: Atheriniformes
- Family: Melanotaeniidae
- Genus: Melanotaenia; T. N. Gill, 1862

Type species
- Atherina nigrans J. Richardson, 1843

Synonyms
- Aida Castelnau, 1875; Aidaprora Whitley, 1935; Amneris Whitley, 1935; Anisocentrus Regan, 1914; Aristeus Castelnau, 1878; Charisella Fowler, 1939; Nematocentris Peters, 1866; Neoatherina Castelnau, 1875; Rhombatractus Gill, 1894; Rhombosoma Regan, 1914; Strabo Kner & Steindachner, 1867; Zantecla Castelnau, 1873

= Melanotaenia =

Genus of fishes

Melanotaenia is a genus of rainbowfish from Australia, Indonesia (West Papua), New Guinea, and nearby smaller islands. As presently recognized, this genus is probably not monophyletic.

== Species ==
There are currently 89 recognized species in this genus:

- Melanotaenia affinis (M. C. W. Weber, 1908) (New Guinea rainbowfish)
- Melanotaenia ajamaruensis G. R. Allen & N. J. Cross, 1980 (Ajamaru rainbowfish)
- Melanotaenia albimarginata G. R. Allen, Hadiaty, Unmack & Erdmann, 2015 (White-tip rainbowfish)
- Melanotaenia ammeri G. R. Allen, Unmack & Hadiaty, 2008 (Ammer's rainbowfish)
- Melanotaenia angfa G. R. Allen, 1990 (Yakati rainbowfish)
- Melanotaenia arfakensis G. R. Allen, 1990 (Arfak rainbowfish)
- Melanotaenia arguni Kadarusman, Hadiaty & Pouyaud, 2012 (Arguni rainbowfish)
- Melanotaenia aruensis G. R. Allen, Hadiaty, Unmack & Erdmann, 2015 (Aru rainbowfish)
- Melanotaenia australis (Castelnau, 1875) (Western rainbowfish)
- Melanotaenia batanta G. R. Allen & Renyaan, 1998 (Batanta rainbowfish)
- Melanotaenia boesemani G. R. Allen & N. J. Cross, 1980 (Boeseman's rainbowfish)
- Melanotaenia bowmani G. R. Allen, Unmack & Hadiaty, 2016 (Bowman's rainbowfish)
- Melanotaenia caerulea G. R. Allen, 1996 (Blue rainbowfish)
- Melanotaenia catherinae (de Beaufort, 1910) (Waigeo rainbowfish)
- Melanotaenia corona G. R. Allen, 1982 (Corona rainbowfish)
- Melanotaenia duboulayi (Castelnau, 1878) (Crimson-spotted rainbowfish)
- Melanotaenia dumasi M. C. W. Weber, 1907 (Omba rainbowfish)
- Melanotaenia eachamensis G. R. Allen & N. J. Cross, 1982 (Lake Eacham rainbowfish)
- Melanotaenia ericrobertsi G. R. Allen, Unmack & Hadiaty, 2014 (Suswa rainbowfish)
- Melanotaenia etnaensis G. R. Allen, Unmack & Hadiaty, 2016 (Etna Bay rainbowfish)
- Melanotaenia exquisita G. R. Allen, 1978 (Exquisite rainbowfish)
- Melanotaenia fasinensis Kadarusman, Sudarto, Paradis & Pouyaud, 2010 (Fasin rainbowfish)
- Melanotaenia flavipinnis G. R. Allen, Hadiaty & Unmack, 2014 (Misool yellowfin rainbowfish)
- Melanotaenia fluviatilis (Castelnau, 1878) (Murray River rainbowfish)
- Melanotaenia fredericki (Fowler, 1939) (Sorong rainbowfish)
- Melanotaenia garylangei J. A. Graf, Herder & Hadiaty, 2015 (Gary Lange's rainbowfish)
- Melanotaenia goldiei (W. J. Macleay, 1883) (Goldie River rainbowfish)
- Melanotaenia gracilis G. R. Allen, 1978 (Slender rainbowfish)
- Melanotaenia grunwaldi G. R. Allen, Unmack & Hadiaty, 2016 (Grunwald's rainbowfish)
- Melanotaenia herbertaxelrodi G. R. Allen, 1980 (Lake Tebera rainbowfish)
- Melanotaenia irianjaya G. R. Allen, 1985 (Irian Jaya rainbowfish)
- Melanotaenia iris G. R. Allen, 1987 (Strickland rainbowfish)
- Melanotaenia jakora J. A. Graf, H. L. Ohee, Herder & Haryono 2023
- Melanotaenia japenensis G. R. Allen & N. J. Cross, 1980 (Japen rainbowfish)
- Melanotaenia kamaka G. R. Allen & Renyaan, 1996 (Kamaka rainbowfish)
- Melanotaenia klasioensis Kadarusman, Hadiaty & Pouyaud, 2015 (Klasio Creek rainbowfish)
- Melanotaenia kokasensis G. R. Allen, Unmack & Hadiaty, 2008 (Kokas rainbowfish)
- Melanotaenia kolaensis G. R. Allen, Hadiaty, Unmack & Erdmann, 2015 (Kola rainbowfish)
- Melanotaenia lacunosa G. R. Allen, Unmack & Hadiaty, 2016 (Mbuta rainbowfish)
- Melanotaenia lacustris Munro, 1964 (Lake Kutubu rainbowfish)
- Melanotaenia lakamora G. R. Allen & Renyaan, 1996 (Lakamora rainbowfish)
- Melanotaenia laticlavia G. R. Allen, Unmack & Hadiaty, 2014 (Aifuf rainbowfish)
- Melanotaenia longispina Kadarusman, Avarre & Pouyaud, 2015 (Long-spine rainbowfish)
- Melanotaenia maccullochi J. D. Ogilby, 1915 (McCulloch's rainbowfish)
- Melanotaenia mairasi G. R. Allen & Hadiaty, 2011 (Lake Furnusu rainbowfish)
- Melanotaenia mamahensis G. R. Allen, Unmack & Hadiaty, 2016 (Mamah rainbowfish)
- Melanotaenia manibuii Kadarusman, Slembrouck & Pouyaud, 2015 (Manibui rainbowfish)
- Melanotaenia maylandi G. R. Allen, 1982 (Mayland's rainbowfish)
- Melanotaenia misoolensis G. R. Allen, 1982 (Misool rainbowfish)
- Melanotaenia monticola G. R. Allen, 1980 (Mountain rainbowfish)
- Melanotaenia mubiensis G. R. Allen, 1996 (Mubi rainbowfish)
- Melanotaenia multiradiata G. R. Allen, Unmack & Hadiaty, 2014 (Moswaren rainbowfish)
- Melanotaenia naramasae Kadarusman, Nugraha & Pouyaud, 2015 (Naramasa rainbowfish)
- Melanotaenia nigrans (J. Richardson, 1843) (Black-banded rainbowfish)
- Melanotaenia ogilbyi M. C. W. Weber, 1910 (Ogilby's rainbowfish)
- Melanotaenia oktediensis G. R. Allen & N. J. Cross, 1980 (Oktedi rainbowfish)
- Melanotaenia papuae G. R. Allen, 1981 (Papuan rainbowfish)
- Melanotaenia parkinsoni G. R. Allen, 1980 (Parkinson's rainbowfish)
- Melanotaenia parva G. R. Allen, 1990 (Lake Kurumoi rainbowfish)
- Melanotaenia patoti M. C. W. Weber, 1907 (Patoti's rainbowfish)
- Melanotaenia picta G. R. Allen, Hadiaty, Unmack & Erdmann, 2015 (Painted rainbowfish)
- Melanotaenia pierucciae G. R. Allen & Renyaan, 1996 (Pierucci's rainbowfish)
- Melanotaenia pimaensis G. R. Allen, 1980 (Pima River rainbowfish)
- Melanotaenia praecox (M. C. W. Weber & de Beaufort, 1922) (Neon rainbowfish)
- Melanotaenia pygmaea G. R. Allen, 1978 (Pygmy rainbowfish)
- Melanotaenia rubripinnis G. R. Allen & Renyaan, 1998 (Red-finned rainbowfish)
- Melanotaenia rubrivittata G. R. Allen, Unmack & Hadiaty, 2015 (Laser-red rainbowfish)
- Melanotaenia rubrostriata (E. P. Ramsay & J. D. Ogilby, 1886) (Red-striped rainbowfish)
- Melanotaenia rumberponensis Kadarusman, Ogistira & Pouyaud, 2015 (Rumberpon rainbowfish)
- Melanotaenia sahulensis Hammer, Allen, Martin, Adams & Unmack, 2019 (Sahul rainbowfish)
- Melanotaenia salawati Kadarusman, Sudarto, Slembrouck & Pouyaud, 2011 (Salawati rainbowfish)
- Melanotaenia sembrae Kadarusman, O. Carman & Pouyaud, 2015 (Sembra rainbowfish)
- Melanotaenia senckenbergianus M. C. W. Weber, 1911 (Senckenberg rainbowfish)
- Melanotaenia sexlineata (Munro, 1964) (Fly River rainbowfish)
- Melanotaenia sikuensis Kadarusman, Sudarto & Pouyaud, 2015 (Siku Creek rainbowfish)
- Melanotaenia sneideri G. R. Allen & Hadiaty, 2013 (Kumawa rainbowfish)
- Melanotaenia solata W. R. Taylor, 1964 (Northern rainbowfish)
- Melanotaenia splendida (W. K. H. Peters, 1866)
  - M. s. inornata (Castelnau, 1875) (Chequered rainbowfish)
  - M. s. splendida (W. K. H. Peters, 1866) (Eastern rainbowfish)
  - M. s. tatei (Zietz, 1896) (Desert rainbowfish)
- Melanotaenia susii Kadarusman, Hubert & Pouyaud, 2015 (Susi Creek rainbowfish)
- Melanotaenia sylvatica G. R. Allen, 1997 (Forest rainbowfish)
- Melanotaenia synergos G. R. Allen & Unmack, 2008 (Batanta Island rainbowfish)
- Melanotaenia trifasciata (Rendahl, 1922) (Regal rainbowfish)
- Melanotaenia urisa Kadarusman, Setia Wibawa & Pouyaud, 2012 (Urisa rainbowfish)
- Melanotaenia utcheensis McGuigen, 2001 (Utchee Creek rainbowfish)
- Melanotaenia vanheurni (M. C. W. Weber & de Beaufort, 1922) (Van Heurn's rainbowfish)
- Melanotaenia veoliae Kadarusman, D. Caruso & Pouyaud, 2012 (Veolia rainbowfish)
- Melanotaenia wanoma Kadarusman, Ségura & Pouyaud, 2012 (Wanoma rainbowfish)
- Melanotaenia wisloni Hammer, Allen, Martin, Adams & Unmack, 2019 (little rainbowfish)
- Melanotaenia wokamensis G. R. Allen, Hadiaty, Unmack & Erdmann, 2015 (Wokam rainbowfish)

== Undescribed species ==
- Melanotaenia sp. (Running River rainbowfish)
