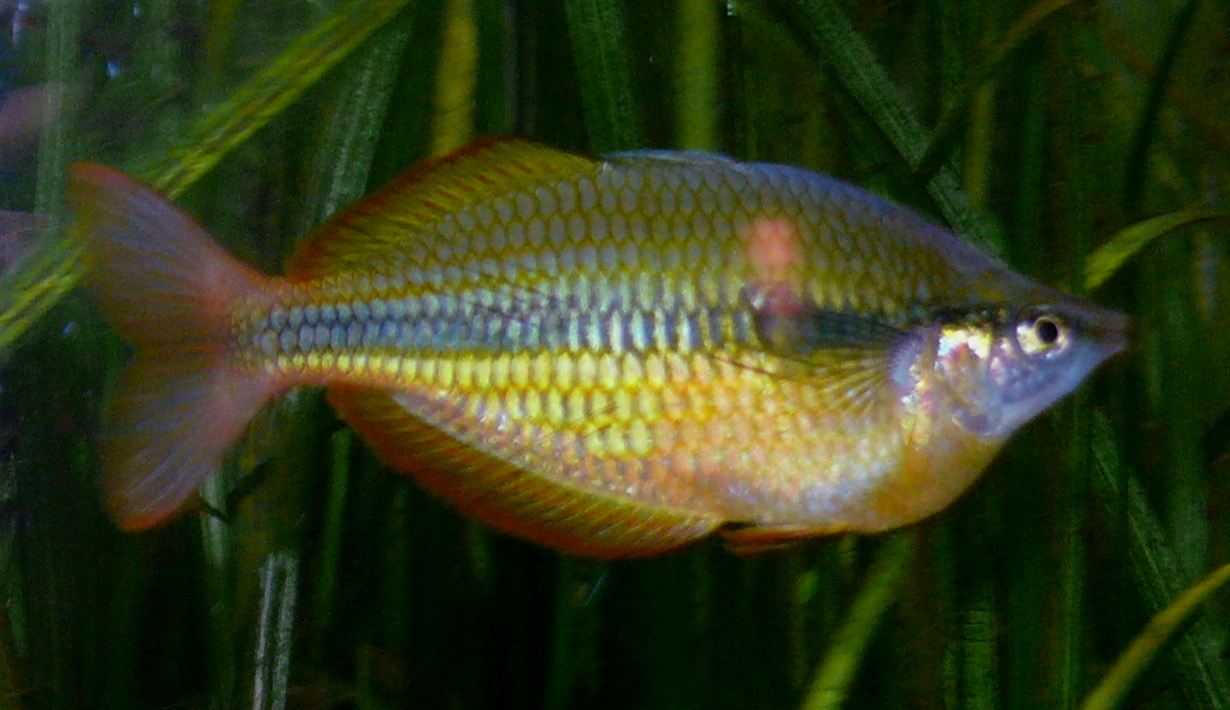

Conservation status
- Vulnerable (IUCN 3.1)

Scientific classification
- Kingdom: Animalia
- Phylum: Chordata
- Class: Actinopterygii
- Order: Atheriniformes
- Family: Melanotaeniidae
- Genus: Melanotaenia
- Species: M. herbertaxelrodi

Binomial name
- Melanotaenia herbertaxelrodi G. R. Allen, 1981

= Lake Tebera rainbowfish =

Species of fish

The Lake Tebera rainbowfish (Melanotaenia herbertaxelrodi) is a species of rainbowfish in the subfamily Melanotaeniinae which is endemic to the Lake Tebera basin in Papua New Guinea. The specific name honours the pet-book publisher Herbert R. Axelrod (1927–2017).
