= Pelangia =

Conservation status
- Critically Endangered (IUCN 3.1)

Scientific classification
- Kingdom: Animalia
- Phylum: Chordata
- Class: Actinopterygii
- Division: Teleostei
- Order: Atheriniformes
- Suborder: Atherinoidei
- Family: Melanotaeniidae
- Genus: Pelangia; G. R. Allen, 1998
- Species: P. mbutaensis

Binomial name
- Pelangia mbutaensis G. R. Allen, 1998

Species of fish

Pelangia mbutaensis is a species of rainbowfish endemic to West Papua in Indonesia. This species was described by Gerald R. Allen in 1988 from types collected from the Lake Mbuta Basin which lies about 8 kilometers northwest of Etna Bay in West Papua. It is the only known member of its genus, the name Pelangia is derived from the Indonesian word for "rainbow" and the specific name refers to the type locality, the swampy basin of Lake Mbuta.
