= Arfak rainbowfish =

Conservation status
- Endangered (IUCN 3.1)

Scientific classification
- Kingdom: Animalia
- Phylum: Chordata
- Class: Actinopterygii
- Order: Atheriniformes
- Family: Melanotaeniidae
- Genus: Melanotaenia
- Species: M. arfakensis

Binomial name
- Melanotaenia arfakensis G. R. Allen, 1990

Species of fish

The Arfak rainbowfish (Melanotaenia arfakensis) is a species of rainbowfish in the subfamily Melanotaeniinae. It is endemic to West Papua in Indonesia. Its natural habitat is rivers. It is threatened by habitat loss. It grows to a length of about 8 cm.
