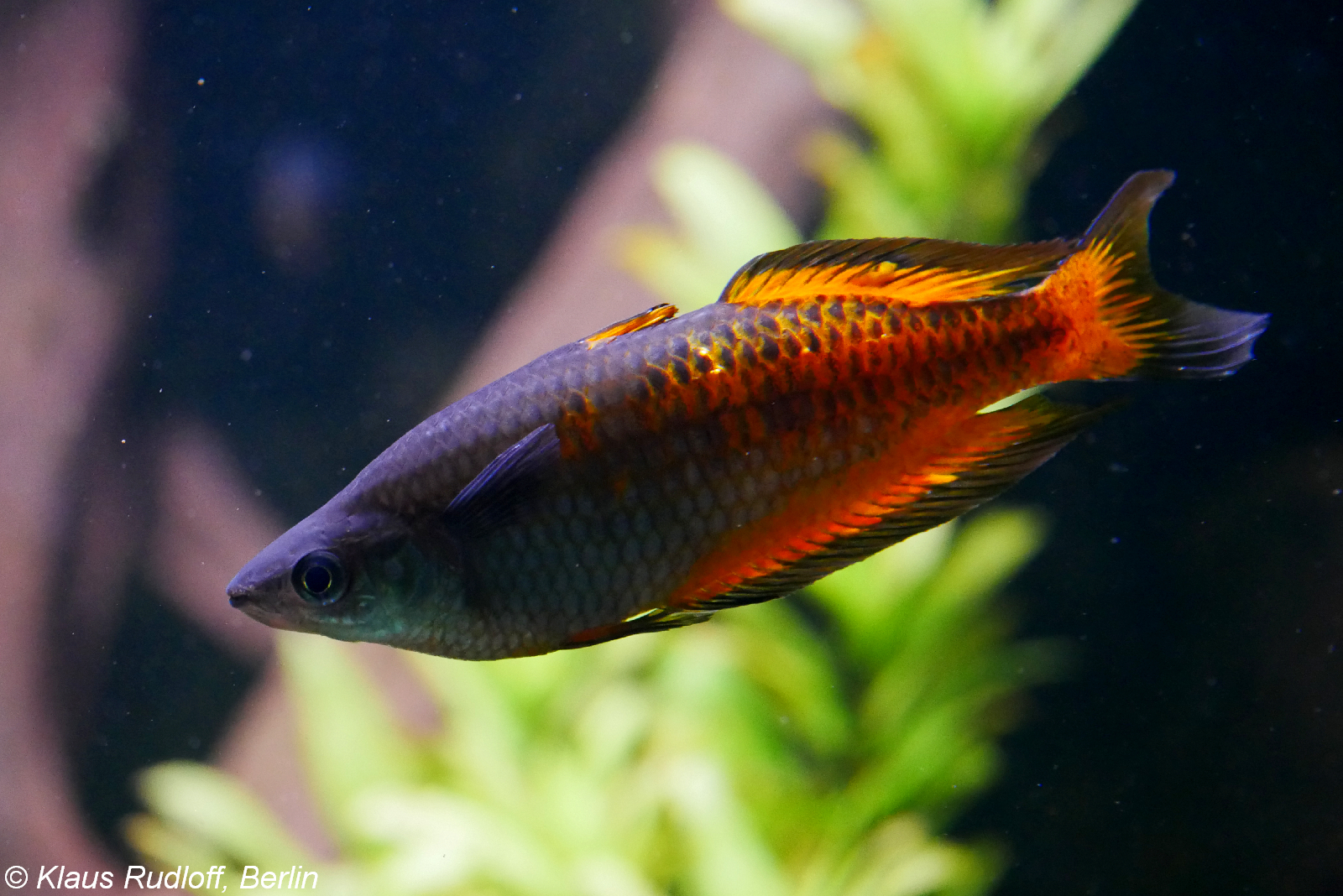

Conservation status
- Near Threatened (IUCN 3.1)

Scientific classification
- Domain: Eukaryota
- Kingdom: Animalia
- Phylum: Chordata
- Class: Actinopterygii
- Order: Atheriniformes
- Family: Melanotaeniidae
- Genus: Melanotaenia
- Species: M. parkinsoni

Binomial name
- Melanotaenia parkinsoni (Allen, 1980)

= Melanotaenia parkinsoni =

Species of fish

Melanotaenia parkinsoni, the orange rainbowfish, is a species of rainbowfish in the subfamily Melanotaeniinae. It endemic to the western lakes of Papua New Guinea, specifically the Kemp Welsh River and Milne Bay.

== Description ==
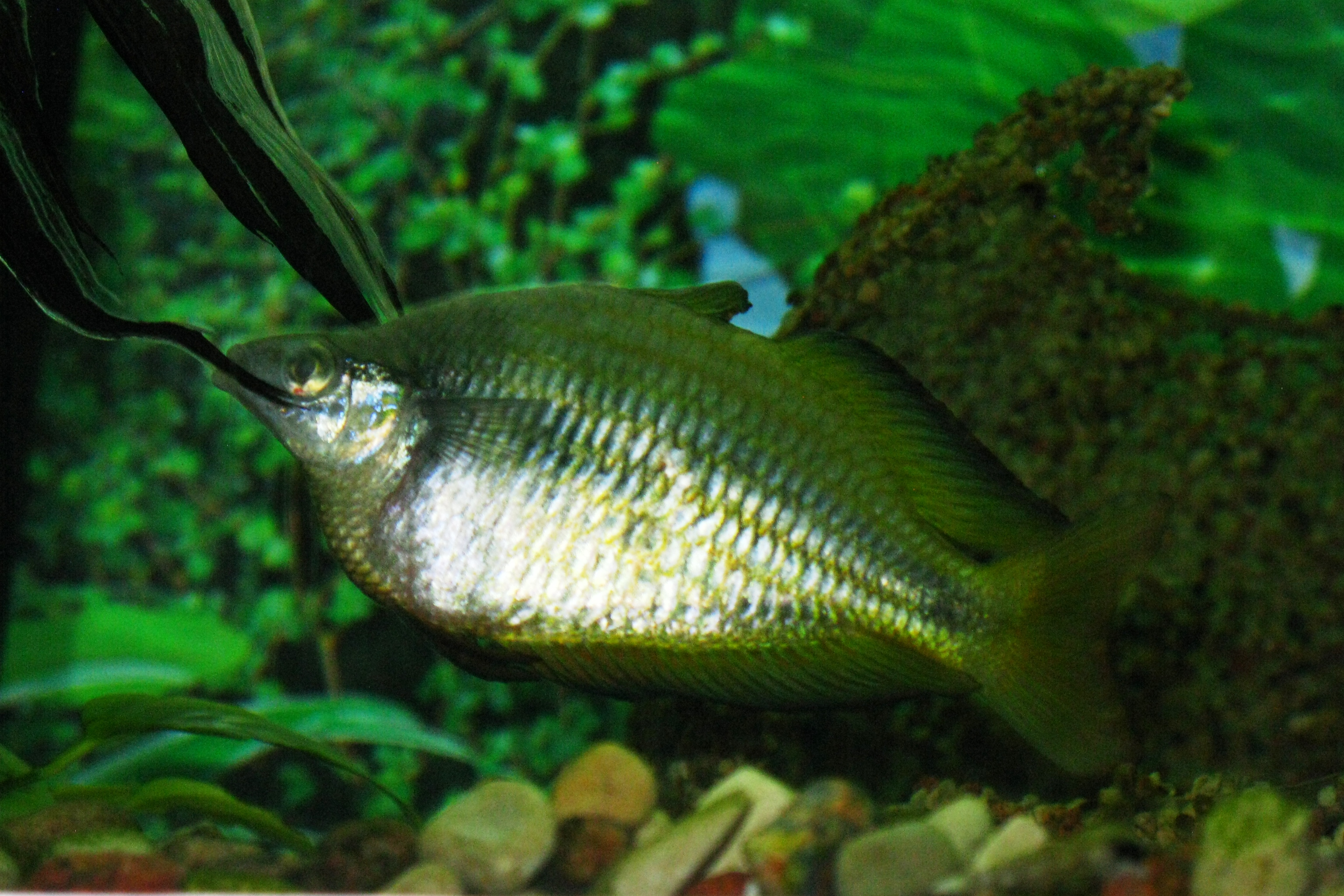
A female individual

The species is a large and muscular rainbowfish, generally attaining a length 15 cm (5.9 in). Individuals are a dark lavender colour at the basic level with a rosy chest. Males have deeper bodies than the females, and have extended fins, as well as the back half of their bodies being coated in a reflective golden-orange.
