= Oktedi rainbowfish =

Conservation status
- Critically Endangered (IUCN 3.1)

Scientific classification
- Kingdom: Animalia
- Phylum: Chordata
- Class: Actinopterygii
- Order: Atheriniformes
- Family: Melanotaeniidae
- Genus: Melanotaenia
- Species: M. oktediensis

Binomial name
- Melanotaenia oktediensis G. R. Allen & N. J. Cross, 1980

Species of fish

The Oktedi rainbowfish (Melanotaenia oktediensis) is a species of rainbowfish in the subfamily Melanotaeniinae. It is endemic to the Ok Tedi River, part of the Fly River system in southern Papua New Guinea. Its natural habitat is rivers.
