= Van Heurn's rainbowfish =

Conservation status
- Least Concern (IUCN 3.1)

Scientific classification
- Kingdom: Animalia
- Phylum: Chordata
- Class: Actinopterygii
- Order: Atheriniformes
- Family: Melanotaeniidae
- Genus: Melanotaenia
- Species: M. vanheurni

Binomial name
- Melanotaenia vanheurni (M. C. W. Weber & de Beaufort, 1922)

Synonyms
- Rhombatractus vanheurni Weber & de Beaufort, 1922

Species of fish

Van Heurn's rainbowfish (Melanotaenia vanheurni) is a species of rainbowfish in the subfamily Melanotaeniinae. It is endemic to West Papua in Indonesia. The specific name honours the Dutch zoologist Willem Cornelis van Heurn (1887-1972).
