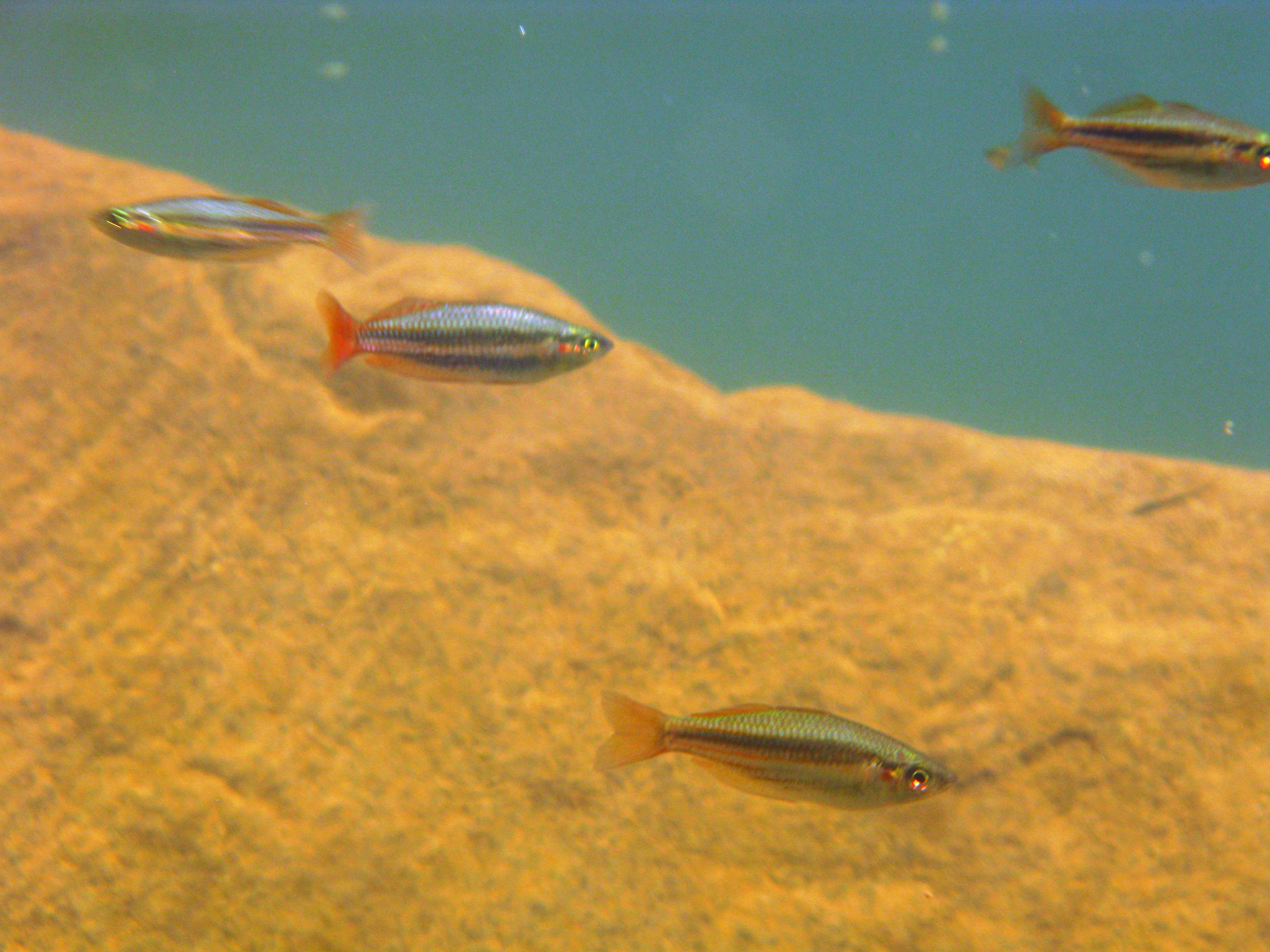

Scientific classification
- Kingdom: Animalia
- Phylum: Chordata
- Class: Actinopterygii
- Division: Teleostei
- Order: Atheriniformes
- Family: Melanotaeniidae
- Genus: Melanotaenia
- Species: M. australis

Binomial name
- Melanotaenia australis (Castelnau, 1878)

Synonyms
- Neoatherina australis Castelnau, 1878

= Melanotaenia australis =

Species of fish

Melanotaenia australis, the western rainbowfish, is a species of freshwater rainbowfish endemic to Australia's Kimberley and Pilbara, Top End. The western rainbowfish (Melanotaenia, australis) is one of the most common and highly abundant freshwater fish endemic to north-western Australia; It ranges from the Ashburton River in the Pilbara region of Western Australia to the Adelaide river in the Northern Territory. It shows extensive geographic variation in their color pattern.

Predation is associated with the variation in color pattern in rainbow fish ( Melanotaenia australis). Meanwhile, variation in reflectance and body shape was associated with variation in environmental conditions.
