= Ajamaru Lakes rainbowfish =

Conservation status
- Critically Endangered (IUCN 3.1)

Scientific classification
- Kingdom: Animalia
- Phylum: Chordata
- Class: Actinopterygii
- Order: Atheriniformes
- Family: Melanotaeniidae
- Genus: Melanotaenia
- Species: M. ajamaruensis

Binomial name
- Melanotaenia ajamaruensis G. R. Allen & N. J. Cross, 1980

Species of fish

The Ajamaru Lakes rainbowfish (Melanotaenia ajamaruensis) is a species of rainbowfish in the Melanotaeniinae subfamily. It is endemic to the Ayamaru Lakes in West Papua, Indonesia. The fish was announced in 1996 based on its IUCN status, then rediscovered in 2007 in the Kaliwensi river, Sorong, West Papua.

== Description ==
This species of freshwater fish is a schooling fish that tends to measure at about 11cm. Similar to other Melanotaenia, this fish is generally reddish brown on the front and back half of the body with yellow or tan gradations on the posterior with reddish brown horizontal stripes on the sides. Occasionally, live fish can have a metallic blue to yellowish base color, or be green with yellow horizontal stripes. Male fish tend to have a more obvious color than female fish, but the male population of the Melanotaenia ajamaruensis is lower than the female population.

The average size of the Melanotaenia ajamaruensis egg diameter, measured from a total of 50 laid egg samples, is approximately 0.98mm. This fish reaches sexual maturity as early as 8-months old, when they are capable of producing transparent eggs.

== Conservation ==
The IUCN records this species as having a data deficiency so it requires further research and conservation. In nature this fish faces threats from the Toraja snakehead fish and Cyprinus, which are invasive species of fish that were introduced to the region. There is concern that these biological threats will cause extinction, so conservation efforts are being carried out is ex situ habitats, where it has been found that the Melanotaenia ajamaruensis is able to reproduce.

Research discovered that the male to female sex ratio of the Melanotaenia ajamaruensis is 1:3, meaning one male fish is able to fertilize 3 individual female fish. This ratio has the highest fertilization rate and the highest number of spawning, eggs, and larvae. In the ex situ habitats, the fish have been measured to have a daily growth of about 0.26mm per day. In further research, it has been shown that having a Spirulina content in feed up to 6% is directly proportional to improving the reproductive performance of the Melanotaenia ajamaruensis, though further research is necessary to obtain the optimal levels of Spirulina.

== Sources ==
- Froese, Rainer; Pauly, Daniel (eds.). "Melanotaenia ajamaruensis". FishBase.
