= Melanotaenia affinis =

Scientific classification
- Domain: Eukaryota
- Kingdom: Animalia
- Phylum: Chordata
- Class: Actinopterygii
- Order: Atheriniformes
- Family: Melanotaeniidae
- Genus: Melanotaenia
- Species: M. affinis

Binomial name
- Melanotaenia affinis (M. C. W. Weber, 1907)

Synonyms
- Rhombatractus affinis Weber, 1907

Species of fish

Melanotaenia affinis, the North New Guinea rainbowfish, New Guinea rainbowfish, or red-finned rainbowfish, is a species of rainbowfish endemic to New Guinea (Western New Guinea and Papua New Guinea). It grows to 11.5 cm (4.5 in) standard length. Of the three known varieties, the so-called standard variety has the widest range. It is commonly found in the Markham, Ramu, and Sepik Rivers; their preferred habitat includes clear rainforest streams, swamps, pools, and lagoons abundant in vegetation and submerged logs.

== In the aquarium ==
The New Guinea rainbowfish is a peaceful and adaptable rainbowfish species that grows to 14 cm. It favors a pH of 7.0, hard water: (100–150 mg/L) and a temperature of 21–28 C (70 to 82 F). It will eat small live foods and prepared diets. Just like related species, it should be kept in shoals.
