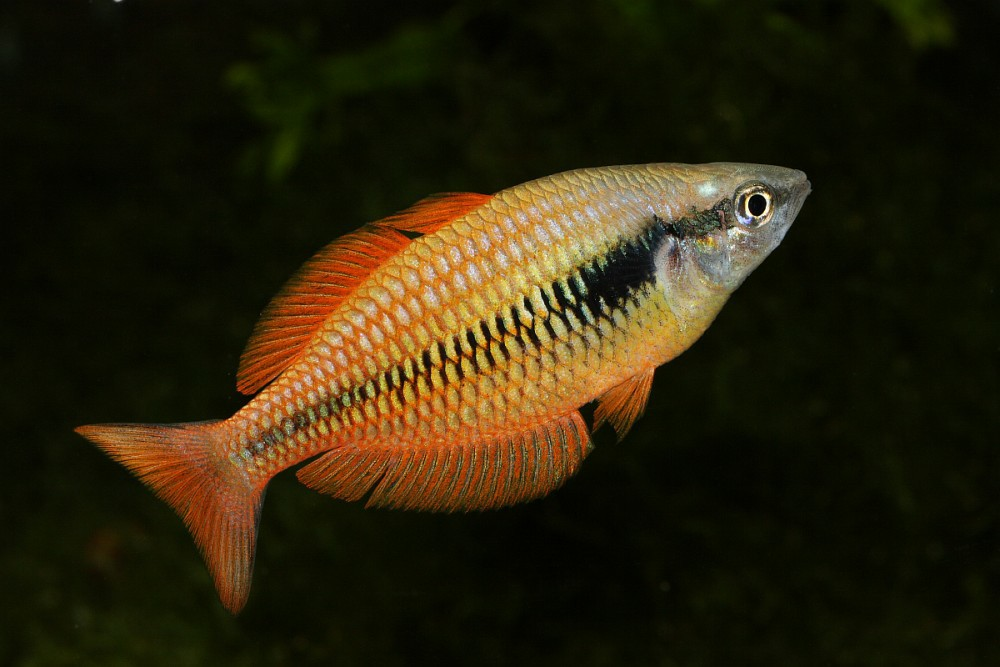

Conservation status
- Critically endangered, possibly extinct in the wild (IUCN 3.1)

Scientific classification
- Kingdom: Animalia
- Phylum: Chordata
- Class: Actinopterygii
- Order: Atheriniformes
- Family: Melanotaeniidae
- Genus: Melanotaenia
- Species: M. parva

Binomial name
- Melanotaenia parva G. R. Allen, 1990

= Lake Kurumoi rainbowfish =

Species of fish

The Lake Kurumoi rainbowfish (Melanotaenia parva) is a species of freshwater rainbowfish in the subfamily Melanotaeniinae. It was endemic to West Papua in Indonesia. Its natural habitat was only the small Lake Kurumoi in the Bird's Head Peninsula. It is primarily threatened by habitat loss, however it is unknown if the wild population still exists as it has probably been extirpated from its entire native range.
