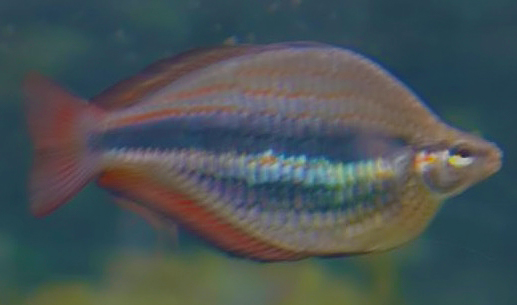

Conservation status
- Least Concern (IUCN 3.1)

Scientific classification
- Domain: Eukaryota
- Kingdom: Animalia
- Phylum: Chordata
- Class: Actinopterygii
- Order: Atheriniformes
- Family: Melanotaeniidae
- Genus: Melanotaenia
- Species: M. trifasciata

Binomial name
- Melanotaenia trifasciata Rendahl, 1922

= Banded rainbowfish =

Species of fish

The banded rainbowfish (Melanotaenia trifasciata), also known as the Jewel rainbowfish, Goyder River rainbowfish, three-striped sunfish or regal rainbowfish, is a species of rainbowfish found in the northerly regions of North Australia and Queensland. An adult banded rainbowfish can reach a standard length of 12–15 cm with a deep body usually exceeding 1/3 of their body length. Like most other rainbowfish, this species varies in color depending on where they were collected, but all varieties have a distinct dark mid-lateral band and bright red/yellow dorsal, anal, and caudal fins.

== Behavior ==
The banded rainbowfish is an active shoaling fish, that typically occurs on the surface and in mid-level areas of fresh water environments.

As seasonal spawners, the banded rainbowfish breeds intermittently throughout the year. Males compete with one another for territory and female attention in contests where they compare body coloration and size by swimming side by side whilst extending their fins to appear larger.

After mating, a typical female can produce between 200–500 eggs, which it affixes to vegetation using adhesive threads. After this, the female will leave, while the male will continue to guard their territory and by extension the eggs until they hatch 6–7 days later.

== Habitat and diet ==
The banded rainbowfish lives in a wide variety of habitats, such as rivers, lagoons and slow moving streams. It prefers areas with strong water flow, sandy substrate, dense sub-surface vegetation and submerged logs and branches.

Banded rainbow fish are opportunistic omnivores, the bulk of their diet being arthropods such as aquatic insects, arachnids and crustaceans as well as algae and terrestrial insects that have drowned on the water surface such as green ants.

== Etymology ==
The name Melanotaenia trifasciata was proposed by Hialmar Rendahl in 1922 while describing the species. The specific epithet trifasciata means "three-banded", although live individuals do not typically have more than a single band. This discrepancy is due to the original museum specimen described by Rendahl having had its pattern altered by being preserved in spirits.

== In captivity ==
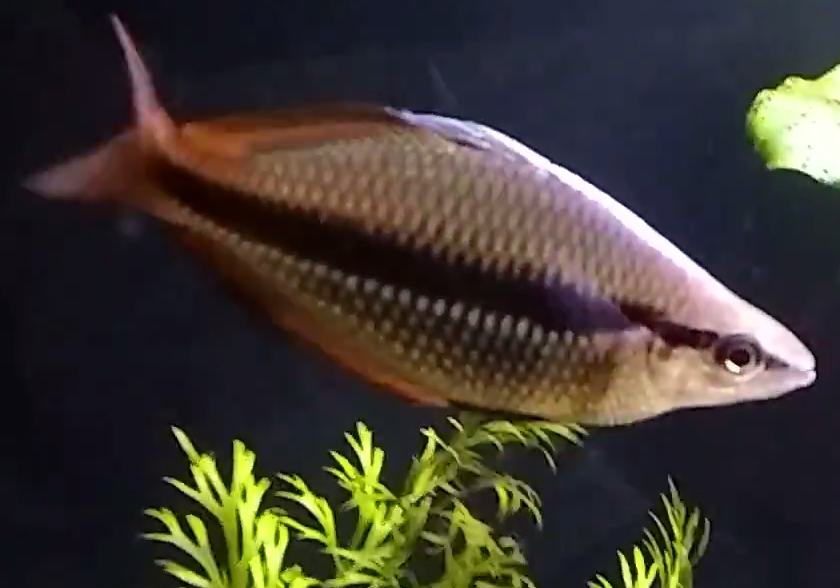
younger rainbowfish are typically more streamlined in appearance.

Rainbowfish are relatively new to the aquarium hobby, and were up until recently kept by only a small group of hobbyists. They have since seen a significant rise in popularity owing to their generally colorful patterns, energetic behavior and ease of care. The banded rainbowfish itself is exemplary of these traits; a hardy and peaceful shoaling fish, they make easy additions to most peaceful community aquariums and can tolerate a wide range of water parameters. Like many other rainbowfish, this species should be kept in an aquarium with a lid as they are capable of jumping out.
