= Blue rainbowfish =

Conservation status
- Vulnerable (IUCN 3.1)

Scientific classification
- Kingdom: Animalia
- Phylum: Chordata
- Class: Actinopterygii
- Order: Atheriniformes
- Family: Melanotaeniidae
- Genus: Melanotaenia
- Species: M. caerulea

Binomial name
- Melanotaenia caerulea G. R. Allen, 1996

Species of fish

The blue rainbowfish (Melanotaenia caerulea) is a species of rainbowfish in the subfamily Melanotaeniinae which is endemic to Papua New Guinea. It is found mostly in the lower and middle Kikori drainage system.

The blue rainbowfish was described by Gerald R. Allen in 1996.
