= Slender rainbowfish =

Conservation status
- Endangered (IUCN 3.1)

Scientific classification
- Kingdom: Animalia
- Phylum: Chordata
- Class: Actinopterygii
- Order: Atheriniformes
- Family: Melanotaeniidae
- Genus: Melanotaenia
- Species: M. gracilis

Binomial name
- Melanotaenia gracilis G. R. Allen, 1978

Species of fish

The slender rainbowfish (Melanotaenia gracilis) is a species of rainbowfish in the subfamily Melanotaeniinae which is endemic to Australia. It occurs in the extreme north of Western Australia in the systems of the Drysdale and King Edward Rivers.
