= Misool rainbowfish =

Conservation status
- Least Concern (IUCN 3.1)

Scientific classification
- Kingdom: Animalia
- Phylum: Chordata
- Class: Actinopterygii
- Order: Atheriniformes
- Family: Melanotaeniidae
- Genus: Melanotaenia
- Species: M. misoolensis

Binomial name
- Melanotaenia misoolensis G. R. Allen, 1982

Species of fish

The Misool rainbowfish (Melanotaenia misoolensis) is a species of rainbowfish in the subfamily Melanotaeniinae. It is endemic to Misool in West Papua, Indonesia. They occur in moderately streams with relatively fast currents and clear water which flow through primary rainforest. This species was described in 1982 by Gerald R. Allen from specimens collected in the tributary of Wai Tama at Fakal, Misool Island, Indonesia, from a series of types collected by Maurits Anne Lieftinck in 1948 and deposited in the Zoological Museum of the University of Amsterdam. The species was introduced to the Aquarium trade by Heiko Bleher in 2001.
