= Yakati rainbowfish =

Conservation status
- Least Concern (IUCN 3.1)

Scientific classification
- Kingdom: Animalia
- Phylum: Chordata
- Class: Actinopterygii
- Order: Atheriniformes
- Family: Melanotaeniidae
- Genus: Melanotaenia
- Species: M. angfa

Binomial name
- Melanotaenia angfa G. R. Allen, 1990

Species of fish

The Yakati rainbowfish (Melanotaenia angfa) is a species of rainbowfish in the Melanotaeniinae subfamily. It is endemic to West Papua in Indonesia.
