= Mountain rainbowfish =

Conservation status
- Near Threatened (IUCN 3.1)

Scientific classification
- Kingdom: Animalia
- Phylum: Chordata
- Class: Actinopterygii
- Order: Atheriniformes
- Family: Melanotaeniidae
- Genus: Melanotaenia
- Species: M. monticola

Binomial name
- Melanotaenia monticola G. R. Allen, 1980

Species of fish

The mountain rainbowfish (Melanotaenia monticola) is a species of rainbowfish in the subfamily Melanotaeniinae. It is endemic to Papua New Guinea, where it occurs in the Southern Highlands between Mendi and Lake Kutubu, in the Purari River system.
