= Papuan rainbowfish =

Conservation status
- Vulnerable (IUCN 3.1)

Scientific classification
- Kingdom: Animalia
- Phylum: Chordata
- Class: Actinopterygii
- Order: Atheriniformes
- Family: Melanotaeniidae
- Genus: Melanotaenia
- Species: M. papuae

Binomial name
- Melanotaenia papuae G. R. Allen, 1981

Species of fish

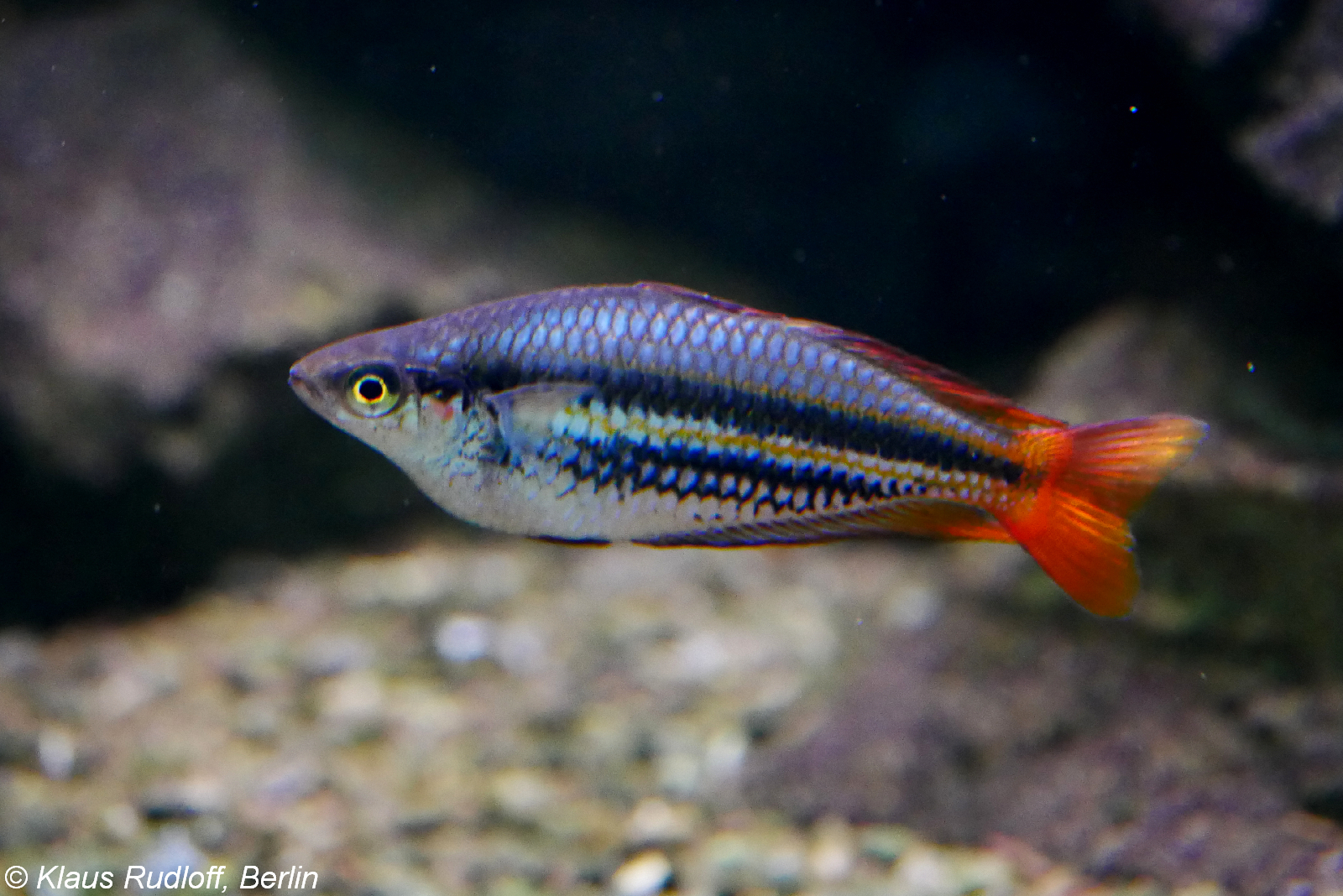
The Papuan Rainbowfish

The Papuan rainbowfish (Melanotaenia papuae) is a species of rainbowfish in the Melanotaeniinae family. It is endemic to the Papuan Peninsula, around Port Moresby.
