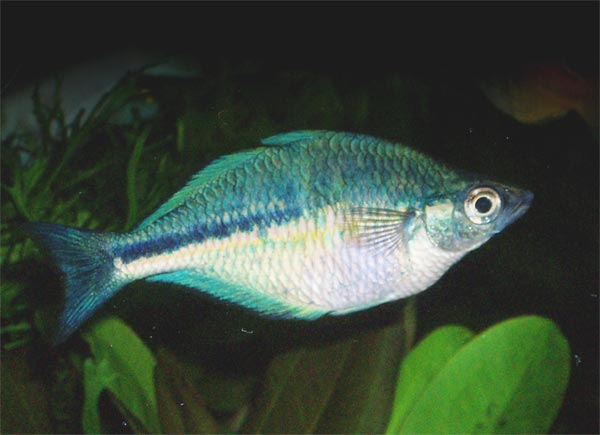

Conservation status
- Endangered (IUCN 3.1)

Scientific classification
- Kingdom: Animalia
- Phylum: Chordata
- Class: Actinopterygii
- Order: Atheriniformes
- Family: Melanotaeniidae
- Genus: Melanotaenia
- Species: M. lacustris

Binomial name
- Melanotaenia lacustris Munro, 1964

= Lake Kutubu rainbowfish =

Species of fish

The Lake Kutubu rainbowfish (Melanotaenia lacustris) is a species of fish in the family Melanotaeniidae. It is also known as turquoise rainbowfish. It is one of 13 fish endemic to Lake Kutubu, a lake found within the Kikori River system in Papua New Guinea.
