= Strickland rainbowfish =

Conservation status
- Vulnerable (IUCN 3.1)

Scientific classification
- Kingdom: Animalia
- Phylum: Chordata
- Class: Actinopterygii
- Order: Atheriniformes
- Family: Melanotaeniidae
- Genus: Melanotaenia
- Species: M. iris

Binomial name
- Melanotaenia iris G. R. Allen, 1987

Species of fish

The Strickland rainbowfish (Melanotaenia iris) is a species of rainbowfish in the subfamily Melanotaeniinae. It is endemic to Papua New Guinea where it is only known to occur in the Logatyu River, a tributary of the Strickland River, in the Fly River system. It is currently known from only five specimens collected in 1984 by D. Gwyther and it was described by Gerald R. Allen in 1987.
