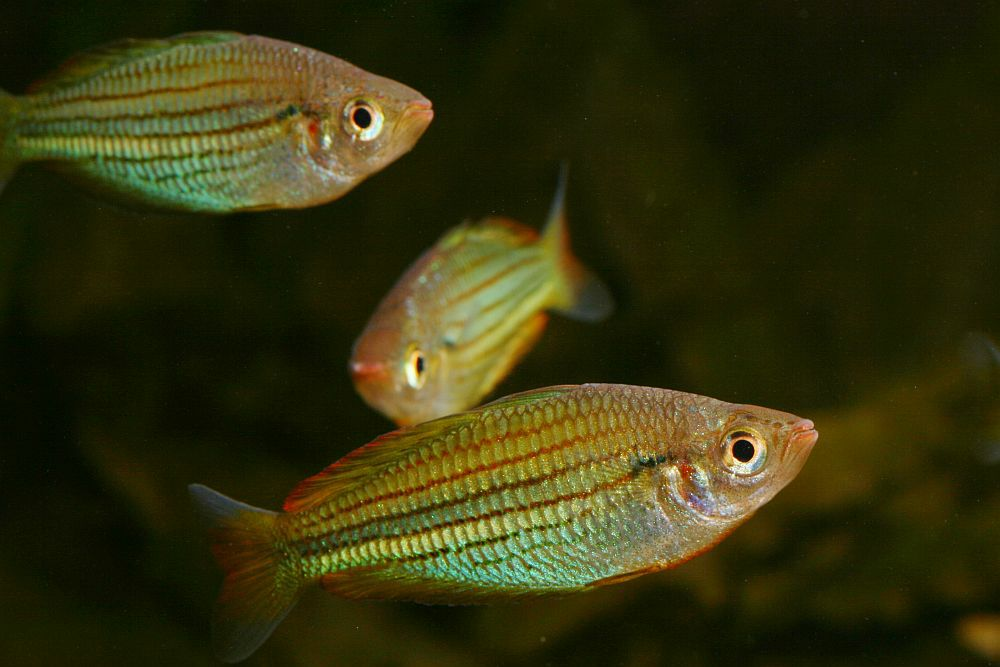

Conservation status
- Endangered (IUCN 3.1)

Scientific classification
- Kingdom: Animalia
- Phylum: Chordata
- Class: Actinopterygii
- Order: Atheriniformes
- Family: Melanotaeniidae
- Genus: Melanotaenia
- Species: M. sexlineata

Binomial name
- Melanotaenia sexlineata (Munro, 1964)

Synonyms
- Nematocentris sexlineatus Munro, 1964

= Fly River rainbowfish =

Species of fish

The Fly River rainbowfish (Melanotaenia sexlineata) is a species of rainbowfish in the subfamily Melanotaeniinae family. It is endemic to the Upper Fly River in Papua New Guinea.
