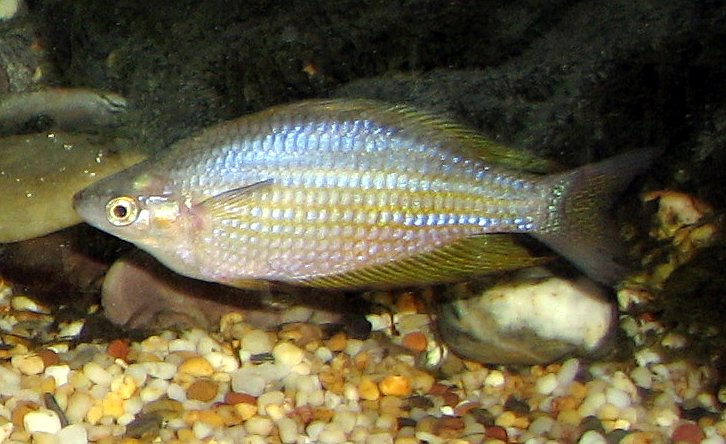
- Male eastern rainbowfish

Scientific classification
- Kingdom: Animalia
- Phylum: Chordata
- Class: Actinopterygii
- Order: Atheriniformes
- Family: Melanotaeniidae
- Genus: Melanotaenia
- Species: M. splendida
- Subspecies: M. s. splendida

Trinomial name
- Melanotaenia splendida splendida W. K. H. Peters 1866

= Eastern rainbowfish =

Subspecies of fish

Melanotaenia splendida splendida, also known as the eastern rainbowfish, is a subspecies of fish in the family Melanotaeniidae endemic to Australia.

The Eastern rainbowfish is widespread on the mainland, and is found in river systems east of the Great Dividing Range of Queensland, Australia, from the Boyne River south of Gladstone to Cape York Peninsula. It is usually found in large schools inhabiting small freshwater streams, but is also found in lakes and reservoirs. It is kept as a tropical aquarium fish.

== Description and diet ==
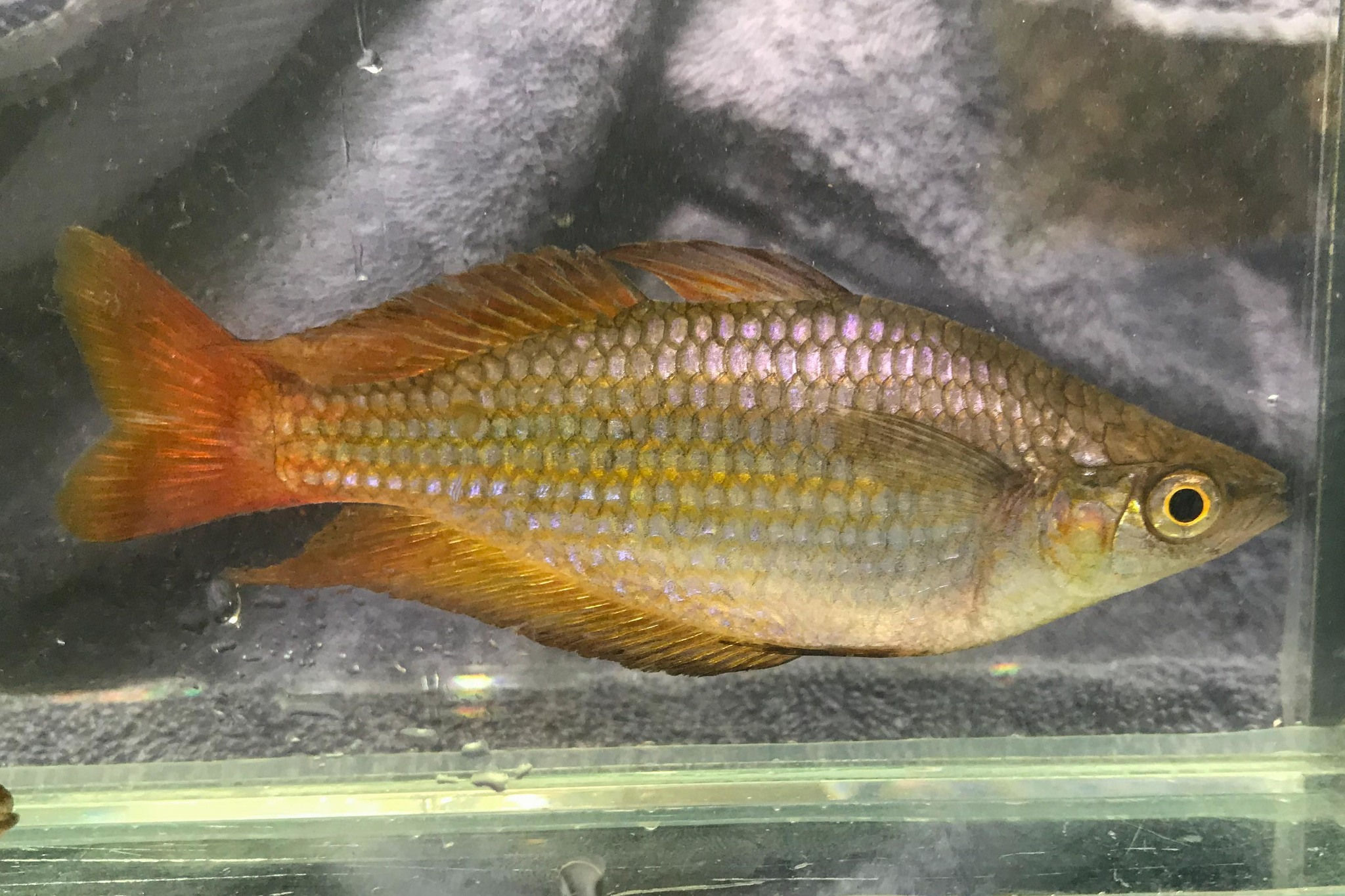
M. s. splendida in Queensland

It is a small fish commonly found up to 8 cm but known to reach up to 14 cm.

Males are highly variable in colour from pale bluish-green or greenish-brown overall to yellowish and paler below, with a yellow or orange spot on the gill cover. Females and juveniles are silvery with translucent or faintly coloured fins.

The eastern rainbowfish is an omnivore and feeds on algae, insects, microcrustaceans and other small invertebrates.
