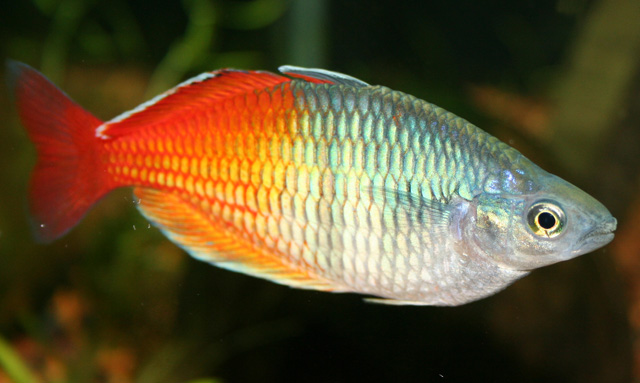
- Boeseman's rainbowfish, Melanotaenia boesemani, male.

Scientific classification
- Kingdom: Animalia
- Phylum: Chordata
- Class: Actinopterygii
- Division: Teleostei
- Order: Atheriniformes
- Suborder: Atherinoidei
- Family: Melanotaeniidae; T. N. Gill, 1894

Genera
- See text

= Rainbowfish =

Family of ray-finned fishes

Rainbowfishes are small, colourful freshwater fishes belonging to the family Melanotaeniidae, found in northern and eastern Australia, New Guinea (including islands in Cenderawasih Bay and Raja Ampat Islands in Indonesia), Sulawesi and Madagascar.

The largest rainbowfish genus and the type of the family, Melanotaenia, derives from the ancient Greek melano (black) and taenia (banded). Translated, it means "black-banded", and is a reference to the often striking lateral black bands that run along the bodies of those in the genus Melanotaenia.

== Characteristics ==
The Melanotaeniidae is characterised by having their distal premaxillary teeth enlarged. They have a compressed body with two dorsal fins separated by a small gap between them. There are 3–7 spines in the first dorsal fin while the second has 6–22 rays, with the first ray being a stout spine in some species, the anal fin has 10–30 rays and, again, the first may be a stout spine in some species. The lateral line is either weakly developed or absent. They have comparatively large scales and these number 28–60 in the lateral series. The pelvic fins are attached to the fish's abdomen by a membrane which runs along the length of the innermost ray and this is a feature which can be used to separate rainbowfishes from silversides (Atherinidae), although the membrane is easily torn. The majority of the species in this family demonstrate conspicuous sexual dimorphism, with the males usually being the more colorful sex and also showing an elongated median fin ray.

Most species of rainbowfish are less than 12 cm (4.7 in) in length, with some species measuring less than 6 cm (2.4 in), while one species, Melanotaenia vanheurni, reaches lengths of up to 20 cm (7.9 in). They live in a wide range of freshwater habitats, including rivers, lakes, and swamps. Although they spawn all year round, they lay a particularly large number of eggs at the start of the local rainy season. The eggs are attached to aquatic vegetation, and hatch seven to 18 days later. Rainbowfish are generalized omnivores, feeding on small crustaceans, insect larvae, and algae.

Melanotaenia, Pseudomugil, and several other genera of rainbowfish include species that regularly appear in the aquarium trade. In the wild, some rainbowfish populations have been severely affected by the aggressive introduced eastern mosquitofish (Gambusia holbrooki), tilapia cichlids, and pollution.

== Classification ==
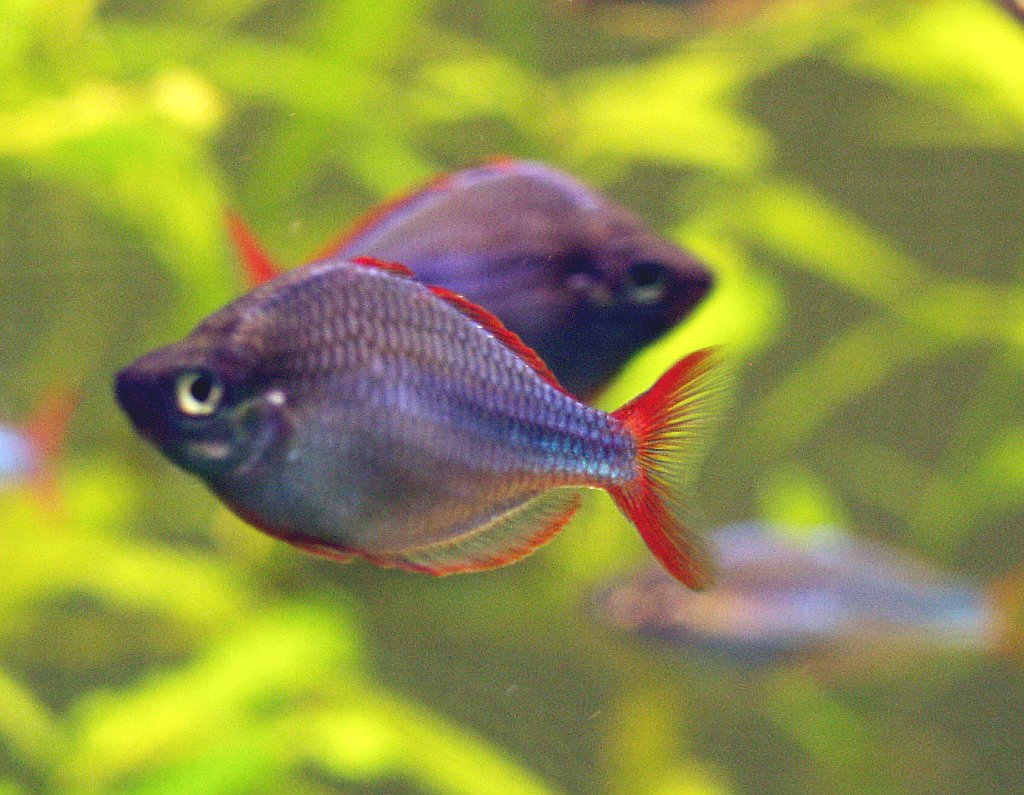
Melanotaenia praecox

Based on Eschmeyer's Catalog of Fishes (2025):

- Family Melotaeniidae Gill, 1894
  - Genus Chilatherina Regan, 1914
  - Genus Glossolepis M. C. W. Weber, 1907
  - Genus Melanotaenia T.N. Gill, 1862
  - Genus Cairnsichthys G. R. Allen, 1980
  - Genus Rhadinocentrus Regan, 1914
  - Genus Iriatherina Meinken, 1974
  - Genus Pelangia G. R. Allen, 1998

The 5th Edition of Fishes of the World classified the Bedotiidae, Pseudomugilidae, and Telmatherinidae as subfamilies of Melotaeniidae as they form a monophyletic group. However, in earlier taxonomic treatments, these were treated as their own families, and Eschmeyer's Catalog of Fishes has also returned to using this classification.

Phylogeny based on Unmack et al. 2013, with additional species from Nugraha et al. 2015;

- Atherinoidei
  - Hypoatherina
  - - Marosatherina ladigesi
    - Pseudomugil gertrudae
  - - - - Rheocles alaotrensis
        - Rheocles wrightae
      - - Rheocles vatosoa
        - Bedotia spp.
    - - - Cairnsichthys rhombosomoides
      - - - Rheocles ornatus
        - - - Iriatherina werneri
          - - Western clade
              - Waigeo clade (M. catherinae, M. synergos)
              - ⊞Bird's Head clades
                ⊟
                - Northern Bird's Head clade (incl. M. ajamaruensis, M. arfakensis, M. boesemani, M. longispina, M. manibuii, M. misoolensis, M. multiradiata, M. susii)
                - Southern Bird's Head clade (incl. M. angfa, M. irianjaya, M. naramasae, M. parva, M. sikuensis)
            - ⊞Clade including Chilatherina, Glossolepis, and Australian Melanotaenia
              ⊟
              - Northern clade (incl. Chilatherina, Glossolepis, M. affinis, M. iris, M. praecox, M. vanheurni)
              - Southern clade (incl. M. australis, M. fluviatilis, M. goldiei, M. gracilis, M. lacustris, M. macculochi, M. monticola, M. nigrans, M. papuae, M. pygmaea, M. sexlineata, M. trifasciata)

== Behaviour in captivity ==
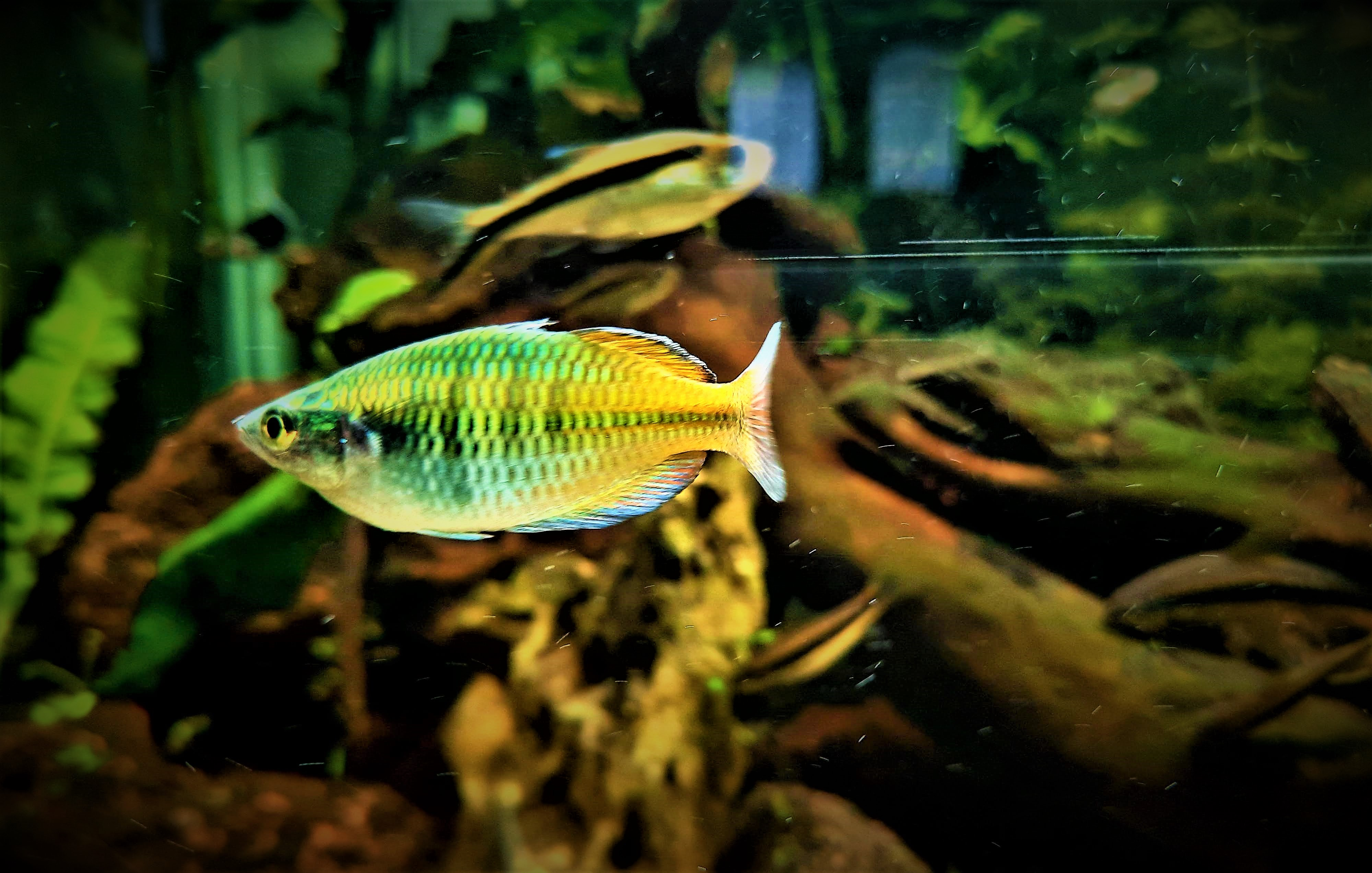
Rainbow fish in aquarium

Rainbowfish usually do best with tropical community fish, such as tetras, guppies, and other rainbowfish. However, two males may sometimes fight at breeding season if there are not enough females. Rainbowfish usually eat floating flakes in captivity, because in the wild they will often eat insects floating on the surface.

In a home setting, these fish need well-oxygenated water with a pH level of 6.8 – 7.2, optimal temperatures varying between 72 and 82 °F (22 and 28 °C), and plenty of aquatic plants to give them hiding places amid their school. If properly cared for, Rainbowfish can live up to 5 years in captivity.
