= List of freshwater fish of Western New Guinea =

This is a list of freshwater fish species found in Western New Guinea, Indonesia. This list also includes freshwater fish found on small islands around Western New Guinea, such as Biak Archipelago, Yapen, Raja Ampat Islands, Aru Islands and Yos Sudarso Island. Island names written in brackets indicate that the species is endemic to that island, or is only known to occur on that island. The listing below is based on the taxonomic treatment of FishBase.

== Order Carcharhiniformes ==
=== Family Carcharhinidae ===
- Carcharhinus leucas (Müller & Henle, 1839)
- Glyphis glyphis Müller & Henle, 1839

== Order Rhinopristiformes ==
=== Family Pristidae ===
- Pristis pristis (Linnaeus, 1758)

== Order Myliobatiformes ==
=== Family Dasyatidae ===
- Urogymnus dalyensis (Last & Manjaji-Matsumoto, 2008)

== Order Osteoglossiformes ==
=== Family Osteoglossidae ===
- Scleropages jardinii (Saville-Kent, 1892)

== Order Elopiformes ==
=== Family Elopidae ===
- Elops hawaiensis Regan, 1909

=== Family Megalopidae ===
- Megalops cyprinoides (Broussonet, 1782)

== Order Anguilliformes ==
=== Family Anguillidae ===
- Anguilla bicolor McClelland, 1844
- Anguilla marmorata Quoy & Gaimard, 1824
- Anguilla obscura Günther, 1872
- Anguilla reinhardtii Steindachner, 1867

=== Family Muraenidae ===
- Gymnothorax polyuranodon (Bleeker, 1854)

=== Family Ophichthidae ===
- Lamnostoma kampeni (Weber & de Beaufort, 1916)

== Order Clupeiformes ==
=== Family Dorosomatidae ===
- Nematalosa flyensis Wongratana, 1983
- Nematalosa papuensis (Munro, 1964)

=== Family Ehiravidae ===
- Clupeoides papuensis (Ramsay & Ogilby, 1886)
- Clupeoides venulosus Weber & de Beaufort, 1912

=== Family Engraulididae ===
- Thryssa rastrosa Roberts, 1978
- Thryssa scratchleyi (Ramsay & Ogilby, 1886)

== Order Gonorynchiformes ==
=== Family Chanidae ===
- Chanos chanos (Forsskål, 1775)

== Order Siluriformes ==
=== Family Ariidae ===
- Aceroichthys dioctes (Kailola, 2000)
- Bleekeriella leptaspis (Bleeker, 1862)
- Brustiarius solidus (Herre, 1935)
- Brustiarius utarus (Kailola, 1990)
- Cinetodus froggatti (Ramsay & Ogilby, 1886)
- Cochlefelis danielsi (Regan, 1908)
- Cochlefelis spatula (Ramsay & Ogilby, 1886)
- Doiichthys novaeguineae Weber, 1913
- Hemiarius hardenbergi (Kailola, 2000)
- Megalosciades augustus (Roberts, 1978)
- Nedystoma dayi (Ramsay & Ogilby, 1886)
- Neoarius hainesi (Kailola, 2000)
- Neoarius berneyi (Whitley, 1941)
- Neoarius graeffei Kner & Steindachner, 1867
- Neoarius pectoralis (Kailola, 2000)
- Pachyula conorhynchus (Weber, 1913)
- Pachyula crassilabris (Ramsay & Ogilby, 1886)
- Papuarius latirostris (Macleay, 1883)
- Paracinetodus carinatus (Weber, 1913)
- Potamosilurus macrorhynchus (Weber, 1913)
- Potamosilurus velutinus (Weber, 1907)

=== Family Plotosidae ===
- Neosilurus ater (Perugia, 1894)
- Neosilurus brevidorsalis (Günther, 1867)
- Neosilurus equinus (Weber, 1913)
- Neosilurus idenburgi (Nichols, 1940)
- Neosilurus novaeguineae (Weber, 1907)
- Oloplotosus mariae Weber, 1913
- Plotosus papuensis Weber, 1910
- Porochilus meraukensis (Weber, 1913)
- Porochilus obbesi Weber, 1913

== Order Lophiiformes ==
=== Family Antennariidae ===
- Antennarius biocellatus Cuvier, 1817

== Order Beloniformes ==
=== Family Hemiramphidae ===
- Arrhamphus sclerolepis Günther, 1866

=== Family Zenarchopteridae ===
- Zenarchopterus alleni (Collette, 1982)
- Zenarchopterus caudovittatus (Weber, 1907)
- Zenarchopterus kampeni (Weber, 1913)
- Zenarchopterus novaeguineae (Weber, 1913)
- Zenarchopterus ornithocephala (Collette, 1985)

=== Family Belonidae ===
- Strongylura krefftii (Günther, 1866)

== Order Atheriniformes ==
=== Family Melanotaeniidae ===
- Chilatherina alleni Price, 1997
- Chilatherina bleheri Allen, 1985
- Chilatherina crassispinosa (Weber, 1913)
- Chilatherina fasciata (Weber, 1913)
- Chilatherina lorentzi (Weber, 1907)
- Chilatherina pricei Allen & Renyaan, 1996 (Yapen)
- Chilatherina sentaniensis (Weber, 1907)
- Glossolepis dorityi Allen, 2001
- Glossolepis incisa (Weber, 1907)
- Glossolepis leggetti Allen & Renyaan, 1998
- Glossolepis multisquamata (Weber & de Beaufort, 1922)
- Glossolepis pseudoincisa Allen & Cross, 1980
- Iriatherina werneri Meinken, 1974
- Melanotaenia affinis (Weber, 1908)
- Melanotaenia ajamaruensis Allen & Cross, 1980
- Melanotaenia albimarginata Allen, Hadiaty, Unmack & Erdmann, 2015 (Aru)
- Melanotaenia ammeri Allen, Unmack & Hadiaty, 2008
- Melanotaenia angfa Allen, 1990
- Melanotaenia arfakensis Allen, 1990
- Melanotaenia arguni Kadarusman, Hadiaty & Pouyaud, 2012
- Melanotaenia aruensis Allen, Hadiaty, Unmack & Erdmann, 2015 (Aru)
- Melanotaenia batanta Allen & Renyaan, 1998 (Batanta)
- Melanotaenia boesemani Allen & Cross, 1980
- Melanotaenia bowmani Allen, Unmack & Hadiaty, 2016
- Melanotaenia catherinae (de Beaufort, 1910) (Waigeo)
- Melanotaenia corona Allen, 1982
- Melanotaenia dumasi Weber, 1907
- Melanotaenia ericrobertsi Allen, Unmack & Hadiaty, 2014
- Melanotaenia etnaensis Allen, Unmack & Hadiaty, 2016
- Melanotaenia fasinensis Kadarusman, Sudarto, Paradis & Pouyaud, 2010
- Melanotaenia flavipinnis Allen, Hadiaty & Unmack, 2014 (Misool)
- Melanotaenia fredericki (Fowler, 1939)
- Melanotaenia garylangei Graf, Herder & Hadiaty, 2015
- Melanotaenia goldiei (Macleay, 1883)
- Melanotaenia grunwaldi Allen, Unmack & Hadiaty, 2016
- Melanotaenia irianjaya Allen, 1985
- Melanotaenia jakora Graf, Ohee, Herder & Haryono, 2023
- Melanotaenia japenensis Allen & Cross, 1980 (Yapen)
- Melanotaenia kamaka Allen & Renyaan, 1996
- Melanotaenia klasioensis Kadarusman, Hadiaty & Pouyaud, 2015
- Melanotaenia kokasensis Allen, Unmack & Hadiaty, 2008
- Melanotaenia kolaensis Allen, Hadiaty, Unmack & Erdmann, 2015 (Aru)
- Melanotaenia lacunosa Allen, Unmack & Hadiaty, 2016
- Melanotaenia lakamora Allen & Renyaan, 1996
- Melanotaenia laticlavia Allen, Unmack & Hadiaty, 2014
- Melanotaenia longispina Kadarusman, Avarre & Pouyaud, 2015
- Melanotaenia mairasi Allen & Hadiaty, 2011
- Melanotaenia mamahensis Allen, Unmack & Hadiaty, 2016
- Melanotaenia manibuii Kadarusman, Slembrouck & Pouyaud, 2015
- Melanotaenia maylandi Allen, 1982
- Melanotaenia misoolensis Allen, 1982 (Misool)
- Melanotaenia multiradiata Allen, Unmack & Hadiaty, 2014
- Melanotaenia naramasae Kadarusman, Nugraha & Pouyaud, 2015
- Melanotaenia ogilbyi Weber, 1910
- Melanotaenia parva Allen, 1990
- Melanotaenia patoti Weber, 1907 (Aru)
- Melanotaenia picta Allen, Hadiaty, Unmack & Erdmann, 2015 (Aru)
- Melanotaenia pierucciae Allen & Renyaan, 1996
- Melanotaenia praecox (Weber & de Beaufort, 1922)
- Melanotaenia rubripinnis Allen & Renyaan, 1998
- Melanotaenia rubrivittata Allen, Unmack & Hadiaty, 2015
- Melanotaenia rubrostriata (Ramsay & Ogilby, 1886)
- Melanotaenia rumberponensis Kadarusman, Ogistira & Pouyaud, 2015
- Melanotaenia sahulensis Hammer, Allen, Martin, Adams & Unmack, 2019
- Melanotaenia salawati Kadarusman, Sudarto, Slembrouck & Pouyaud, 2011 (Salawati)
- Melanotaenia senckenbergianus Weber, 1911 (Aru)
- Melanotaenia sembrae Kadarusman, Carman & Pouyaud, 2015
- Melanotaenia sikuensis Kadarusman, Sudarto & Pouyaud, 2015
- Melanotaenia sneideri Allen & Hadiaty, 2013
- Melanotaenia susii Kadarusman, Hubert & Pouyaud, 2015
- Melanotaenia synergos Allen & Unmack, 2008 (Batanta)
- Melanotaenia urisa Kadarusman, Setiawibawa & Pouyaud, 2012
- Melanotaenia vanheurni (Weber & de Beaufort, 1922)
- Melanotaenia veoliae Kadarusman, Caruso & Pouyaud, 2012
- Melanotaenia wanoma Kadarusman, Ségura & Pouyaud, 2012
- Melanotaenia wokamensis Allen, Hadiaty, Unmack & Erdmann, 2015 (Aru)
- Pelangia mbutaensis Allen, 1998

=== Family Pseudomugilidae ===
- Pseudomugil gertrudae Weber, 1911
- Pseudomugil inconspicuus Roberts, 1978
- Pseudomugil ivantsoffi Allen & Renyaan, 1999
- Pseudomugil luminatus Allen, Unmack & Hadiaty, 2016
- Pseudomugil novaeguineae Weber, 1907
- Pseudomugil paludicola Allen & Moore, 1981
- Pseudomugil pellucidus Allen & Ivantsoff, 1998
- Pseudomugil reticulatus Allen & Ivantsoff, 1986
- Pseudomugil tenellus Taylor, 1964

=== Family Telmatherinidae ===
- Kalyptatherina helodes (Ivantsoff & Allen, 1984)

=== Family Atherinidae ===
- Craterocephalus fistularis Crowley, Ivantsoff & Allen, 1995
- Craterocephalus nouhuysi (Weber, 1910)
- Craterocephalus randi Nichols & Raven, 1934
- Sashatherina gigantea Ivantsoff & Allen, 2011

== Order Mugiliformes ==
=== Family Mugilidae ===
- Cestraeus goldiei (Macleay, 1883)
- Chelon melinopterus (Valenciennes, 1836)
- Ellochelon vaigiensis (Quoy & Gaimard, 1825)
- Moolgarda buchanani (Bleeker, 1853)
- Moolgarda heterocheilos (Bleeker, 1855)
- Moolgarda seheli (Forsskål, 1775)
- Moolgarda tade (Fabricius, 1775)
- Mugil cephalus Linnaeus, 1758
- Planiliza alata (Steindachner, 1892)
- Planiliza macrolepis (Smith, 1846)
- Planiliza subviridis (Valenciennes, 1836)

== Order Syngnathiformes ==
=== Family Syngnathidae ===
- Hippichthys heptagonus Bleeker, 1849
- Hippichthys spicifer (Ruppel, 1838)
- Microphis brachyurus (Bleeker, 1854)
- Microphis brevidorsalis (de Beaufort, 1913)
- Microphis caudocarinatus (Weber, 1907)
- Microphis leiaspis (Bleeker, 1854)
- Microphis manadensis (Bleeker, 1856)
- Microphis retzii (Bleeker, 1856)

== Order Synbranchiformes ==
=== Family Synbranchidae ===
- Ophisternon bengalense McClelland, 1844

== Order Kurtiformes ==
=== Family Apogonidae ===
- Fibramia amboinensis (Bleeker, 1853)
- Glossamia aprion (Richardson, 1842)
- Glossamia arguni Hadiaty & Allen, 2011
- Glossamia beauforti (Weber, 1907)
- Glossamia gjellerupi (Weber & de Beaufort, 1929)
- Glossamia sandei (Weber, 1907)
- Glossamia timika Allen, Hortle & Renyaan, 2000
- Glossamia trifasciata (Weber, 1913)
- Glossamia wichmanni (Weber, 1907)
- Yarica hyalosoma (Bleeker, 1852)

=== Family Kurtidae ===
- Kurtus gulliveri Castelnau, 1878

== incertae sedis ==
=== Series Carangaria ===
==== Family Latidae ====
- Lates calcarifer (Bloch, 1790)

==== Family Toxotidae ====
- Protoxotes lorentzi (Weber, 1910)
- Toxotes chatareus (Hamilton, 1822)
- Toxotes jaculatrix (Pallas, 1767)

=== Series Ovalentaria ===
==== Family Ambassidae ====
- Ambassis buruensis Bleeker, 1856
- Ambassis interrupta Bleeker, 1853
- Ambassis macracanthus Bleeker, 1849
- Ambassis miops Günther, 1872
- Pseudoambassis agrammus (Günther, 1867)
- Parambassis altipinnis Allen, 1982
- Parambassis confinis (Weber, 1913)
- Parambassis gulliveri (Castelnau, 1878)

==== Family Pomacentridae ====
- Neopomacentrus taeniurus Bleeker, 1856

=== Series Eupercaria ===
==== Family Gerreidae ====
- Gerres filamentosus Cuvier, 1829

==== Family Lutjanidae ====
- Lutjanus argentimaculatus (Forsskål, 1775)
- Lutjanus fuscescens (Valenciennes, 1830)

==== Family Monodactylidae ====
- Monodactylus argenteus (Linnaeus, 1758)

==== Family Sciaenidae ====
- Nibea soldado (Lacepède, 1802)
- Nibea squamosa Sasaki, 1992

==== Family Sparidae ====
- Acanthopagrus berda (Fabricius, 1775)

== Order Centrarchiformes ==
=== Family Kuhliidae ===
- Kuhlia marginata (Cuvier, 1829)
- Kuhlia rupestris (Lacépède, 1802)

=== Family Terapontidae ===
- Hephaestus habbemai (Weber, 1910)
- Hephaestus lineatus Allen, 1984
- Hephaestus obtusifrons (Mees & Kailola, 1977)
- Hephaestus roemeri (Weber, 1910)
- Mesopristes argenteus (Cuvier, 1829)
- Mesopristes cancellatus (Cuvier, 1829)
- Pingalla lorentzi (Weber, 1910)
- Terapon jarbua Fabricius, 1775
- Variichthys jamoerensis (Mees, 1971)

== Order Blenniiformes ==
=== Family Blenniidae ===
- Meiacanthus anema Bleeker, 1852

== Order Gobiiformes ==
=== Family Rhyacichthyidae ===
- Rhyacichthys aspro (Valenciennes, 1837)

=== Family Eleotridae ===
- Allomogurnda nesolepis (Weber, 1907)
- Allomogurnda sampricei Allen, 2003 (Yapen)
- Bunaka gyrinoides (Bleeker, 1853)
- Belobranchus belobranchus (Valenciennes, 1837)
- Belobranchus segura Keith, Hadiaty & Lord, 2012
- Eleotris fusca (Forster, 1801)
- Eleotris melanosoma (Bleeker, 1853)
- Giuris margaritacea (Valenciennes, 1837)
- Hypseleotris compressa (Krefft, 1864)
- Mogurnda aurifodinae Whitley, 1938
- Mogurnda aiwasoensis Allen & Renyaan, 1996
- Mogurnda arguni Allen & Hadiaty, 2014
- Mogurnda cingulata Allen & Hoese, 1991
- Mogurnda kaifayama Allen & Jenkins, 1999
- Mogurnda kaimana Allen & Hadiaty, 2014
- Mogurnda magna Allen & Renyaan, 1996
- Mogurnda mbuta Allen & Jenkins, 1999
- Mogurnda mogurnda Richardson, 1844
- Mogurnda pardalis Allen & Renyaan, 1996
- Mogurnda wapoga Allen, Jenkins & Renyaan, 1999

=== Family Butidae ===
- Bostrychus aruensis Weber, 1911 (Aru)
- Bostrychus strigogenys Nichols, 1937
- Bostrychus zonatus Weber, 1907
- Butis amboinensis (Bleeker, 1853)
- Butis butis (Hamilton, 1822)
- Butis melanostigma (Bleeker, 1849)
- Oxyeleotris aruensis (Weber, 1911)
- Oxyeleotris altipinna Allen & Renyaan, 1996
- Oxyeleotris colasi Pouyaud, Kadarusman, Hadiaty, Slembrouck, Lemauk, Kusumah & Keith, 2013
- Oxyeleotris fimbriata (Weber, 1907)
- Oxyeleotris herwerdenii (Weber, 1910)
- Oxyeleotris nullipora Roberts, 1978
- Oxyeleotris paucipora Roberts, 1978
- Oxyeleotris selheimi (Macleay, 1884)
- Oxyeleotris stagnicola Allen, Hortle & Renyaan, 2000
- Oxyeleotris wisselensis Allen & Boeseman, 1982

=== Family Oxudercidae ===
- Periophthalmodon freycineti (Quoy & Gaimard, 1824)
- Periophthalmus argentilineatus Valenciennes, 1837
- Periophthalmus novaeguineaensis Eggert, 1935
- Periophthalmus weberi Eggert, 1935
- Zappa confluentus (Roberts, 1978)

=== Family Gobiidae ===
- Awaous grammepomus (Bleeker, 1849)
- Caragobius urolepis (Bleeker, 1852)
- Glossogobius aureus Akihito & Meguro, 1975
- Glossogobius bicirrhosus Weber, 1894
- Glossogobius bulmeri Whitley, 1959
- Glossogobius celebius Valenciennes, 1837
- Glossogobius clitellus Hoese & Allen, 2012 (Waigeo)
- Glossogobius concavifrons Ramsay & Ogilby, 1886
- Glossogobius giuris Hamilton, 1822
- Glossogobius gnomus Hoese, Allen & Hadiaty, 2017
- Glossogobius hoesei Allen & Boeseman, 1982
- Glossogobius illimis Hoese & Allen, 2012
- Glossogobius munroi Hoese & Allen, 2012
- Glossogobius pumilus Hoese, Allen & Hadiaty, 2017
- Glossogobius sentaniensis Hoese & Allen, 2015
- Lentipes crittersius Watson & Allen, 1999 (Biak)
- Lentipes dimetrodon Watson & Allen, 1999
- Lentipes multiradiatus Allen, 2001
- Lentipes venustus Allen, 2004
- Mugilogobius mertoni (Weber, 1911)
- Mugilogobius platystoma (Günther, 1872) (Aru)
- Mugilogobius rambaiae (Smith, 1945)
- Oligolepis acutipennis (Valenciennes, 1837)
- Psammogobius biocellatus (Valenciennes, 1837)
- Pseudogobiopsis tigrellus (Nichols, 1951)
- Pseudogobius hoesei Larson & Hammer, 2021
- Pseudogobius melanosticta Day, 1876
- Redigobius balteatus (Herre, 1935)
- Redigobius bikolanus (Herre, 1927)
- Redigobius chrysosoma (Bleeker, 1875)
- Redigobius nanus Larson, 2010
- Redigobius oyensi (de Beaufort, 1913)
- Redigobius tambujon (Bleeker, 1854)
- Schismatogobius bruynisi de Beaufort, 1912
- Schismatogobius marmoratus (Peters, 1868)
- Sicyopterus calliochromus Keith, Allen & Lord, 2012
- Sicyopterus cynocephalus (Valenciennes, 1837)
- Sicyopterus erythropterus Keith, Allen & Lord, 2012
- Sicyopterus hageni Popta, 1921
- Sicyopterus lagocephalus (Pallas, 1770)
- Sicyopterus lengguru Keith, Lord & Hadiaty, 2012
- Sicyopterus longifilis de Beaufort, 1912
- Sicyopterus microcephalus (Bleeker, 1855)
- Sicyopterus ouwensi Weber, 1913
- Sicyopterus stiphodonoides Keith, Allen & Lord, 2012
- Sicyopus discordipinnis Watson, 1995
- Sicyopus zosterophorus Bleeker, 1856
- Smilosicyopus fehlmanni (Parenti & Maciolek, 1993)
- Smilosicyopus leprurus (Sakai & Nakamura, 1979)
- Smilosicyopus mystax (Watson & Allen, 1999)
- Stenogobius beauforti (Weber, 1907)
- Stenogobius lachneri Allen, 1991
- Stenogobius laterisquamatus (Weber, 1907)
- Stenogobius marinus Watson, 1991
- Stenogobius psilosinionus Watson, 1991
- Stiphodon atratus Watson, 1996
- Stiphodon birdsong Watson, 1996
- Stiphodon pelewensis Herre, 1936
- Stiphodon rutilaureus Watson, 1996
- Stiphodon semoni Weber, 1895
- Stiphodon surrufus Watson & Kottelat, 1995
- Stiphodon weberi Watson, Allen & Kottelat, 1998 (Yapen)
- Taenioides anguillaris (Linnaeus, 1758)
- Taenioides cirratus (Blyth, 1860)

== Order Acanthuriformes ==
=== Family Leiognathidae ===
- Leiognathus equula (Forsskål, 1775)

=== Family Lobotidae ===
- Datnioides campbelli Whitley, 1939

=== Family Siganidae ===
- Siganus vermiculatus (Valenciennes, 1835)

=== Family Scatophagidae ===
- Scatophagus argus (Linnaeus, 1766)

== Order Pleuronectiformes ==
=== Family Cynoglossidae ===
- Cynoglossus heterolepis Weber, 1910

=== Family Soleidae ===
- Brachirus villosus (Weber, 1907)
- Leptachirus alleni Randall, 2007
- Leptachirus klunzingeri (Weber, 1907)
- Leptachirus lorentz Randall, 2007
- Pardachirus poropterus (Bleeker, 1851)

== Order Tetraodontiformes ==
=== Family Tetraodontidae ===
- Chelonodon patoca (Hamilton, 1822)
- Dichotomyctere erythrotaenia (Bleeker, 1853)
- Marilyna meraukensis (de Beaufort, 1955)
