= Honey blue-eye =

Conservation status
- Endangered (IUCN 3.1)

Scientific classification
- Kingdom: Animalia
- Phylum: Chordata
- Class: Actinopterygii
- Order: Atheriniformes
- Family: Pseudomugilidae
- Genus: Pseudomugil
- Species: P. mellis

Binomial name
- Pseudomugil mellis G. R. Allen & Ivantsoff, 1982

Species of fish

The honey blue-eye (Pseudomugil mellis) is an endangered species of fish in the subfamily Pseudomugilinae. It is endemic to southeastern Queensland, Australia, where it is found in mildly acidic, often tannin-stained, ponds and streams in wallum habitat.

== Taxonomy ==
Previously considered a colour variant of the related pacific blue-eye (Pseudomugil signifer), the honey blue-eye was described by Gerald R. Allen and Walter Ivantsoff in 1982. The species name is derived from the Latin word mel "honey". It is markedly smaller than its close relative. It was confirmed genetically as distinct in a molecular study of it and the Pacific blue-eye in 2004.

== Description ==
The honey blue-eye is a small, pale honey coloured fish that can attain up to 2.5–3 cm (1–1 1/8 in) in length as an adult, with the largest recorded being a male of 3.8 cm (1 1/2 in). As the common name suggests, the honey blue-eye has blue eyes. It has blue cheeks and a single fine midlateral line running along its body from the tip of the pectoral fin backwards. The female has clear fins. Male honey blue-eyes have distinct black submarginal bands and white margins on their dorsal, anal and caudal fins. Honey blue-eyes form schools from about 25 to 70 individuals.

== Distribution and habitat ==
The honey blue-eye is found in two disjunct areas of in wallum heathland in central and southeastern Queensland: in Dismal Swamp 70 km northeast of Rockhampton, and then from lakes and streams around Tin Can Bay south to Tibrogargan Creek 45 km north of Brisbane. It is found on Fraser Island but not other islands off the Queensland coast. Within its range its occurrence is patchy—it is found in 18 scattered localities. The water it is found in is generally slow-moving, mildly acidic (pH 4.4–6.8), and either clear or stained with tannin. Fish species it is commonly found with include ornate rainbowfish (Rhadinocentrus ornatus), crimson-spotted rainbowfish (Melanotaenia duboulayi), empire gudgeon (Hypseleotris compressa), firetailed gudgeon (Hypseleotris galii), and western carp gudgeon (Hypseleotris klunzingeri), and occasionally with the Oxleyan pygmy perch (Nannoperca oxleyana) or Pacific blue-eye.

== Conservation ==
Originally classified as vulnerable in 1988, the honey blue-eye was reclassified as endangered by the IUCN in 1996. It is listed as vulnerable under the Environment Protection and Biodiversity Conservation Act 1999 nationally in Australia, and under state-based legislation in Queensland.

Its habitat is fragmented as it lies on the fringes of large urban areas, much of which has been subjected to massive development. Within its range, three invasive fish species—eastern mosquitofish (Gambusia holbrooki), green swordtail (Xiphophorus hellerii) and southern platyfish (X. maculatus)—have established themselves, though their extent is unknown. The aggressive eastern mosquitofish is known to impact on other fish species, and is still introduced to streams in the mistaken belief it assists with mosquito control.

Furthermore, populations are impacted by collection of wild fish for the aquarium industry.

== Feeding ==
Algae form the bulk of the diet of the honey blue-eye, with the remainder made up of insects and other aquatic invertebrates. The honey blue-eye generally forages at the surface of the water.

== Breeding ==
Female honey blue-eyes are sexually mature at three months of age or when they have reached 1.5–2 cm (5/8–3/4 in) in standard length. Spawning takes place in spring and summer. Females spawn 40–125 eggs over 7–9 days, generally depositing them at the base of aquatic vegetation. When the young honey blue-eyes hatch, they will usually feed from the surface of the water.

The life span of the species is around 1–2 years in the wild, and around 2 years in aquariums.
