= Cape blue-eye =

Conservation status
- Data Deficient (IUCN 3.1)

Scientific classification
- Kingdom: Animalia
- Phylum: Chordata
- Class: Actinopterygii
- Order: Atheriniformes
- Family: Pseudomugilidae
- Genus: Pseudomugil
- Species: P. majusculus

Binomial name
- Pseudomugil majusculus Ivantsoff & G. R. Allen, 1984

Species of fish

The cape blue-eye (Pseudomugil majusculus) is a species of fish in the subfamily Pseudomugilinae. It is endemic to Papua New Guinea. This species reaches a length of 5.0 cm (2.0 in).
