= Pseudomugil halophilus =

Scientific classification
- Kingdom: Animalia
- Phylum: Chordata
- Class: Actinopterygii
- Order: Atheriniformes
- Family: Pseudomugilidae
- Genus: Pseudomugil
- Species: P. halophilus

Binomial name
- Pseudomugil halophilus Hammer, Allen, Adams & Unmack, 2024

Species of bony fish

Pseudomugil halophilus, commonly called the mangrove blue-eye, is a species of fish in the genus Pseudomugil. It is found in mangrove habitats in coastal eastern Queensland, Australia.

== Description ==
The mangrove blue-eye is a small, semi-translucent fish that can reach up to 2.3–3 cm (0.9–1.2 in) in length as an adult. The mangrove blue-eye has blue eyes with a narrow, yellow lateral stripe which runs along its body to its semi-translucent, yellow anal fin with a blackish streak on the bottom.

== Taxonomy ==
Previously mistaken for the Pacific blue-eye due to their similar appearance, the mangrove blue-eye was described and found to be genetically distinct in 2024.
