= Paska's blue-eye =

Conservation status
- Critically Endangered (IUCN 3.1)

Scientific classification
- Kingdom: Animalia
- Phylum: Chordata
- Class: Actinopterygii
- Division: Teleostei
- Order: Atheriniformes
- Family: Pseudomugilidae
- Genus: Pseudomugil
- Species: P. paskai

Binomial name
- Pseudomugil paskai G. R. Allen & Ivantsoff, 1986

Species of fish

Paska's blue-eye (Pseudomugil paskai) is a species of fish in the subfamily Pseudomugilinae. It is found in the Fly River system in Papua New Guinea. This species reaches a length of 3.0 cm (1.2 in).

== Etymology ==
The specific name honours John Paska who was a technician with the Papua New Guinea Ministry of Fisheries.
