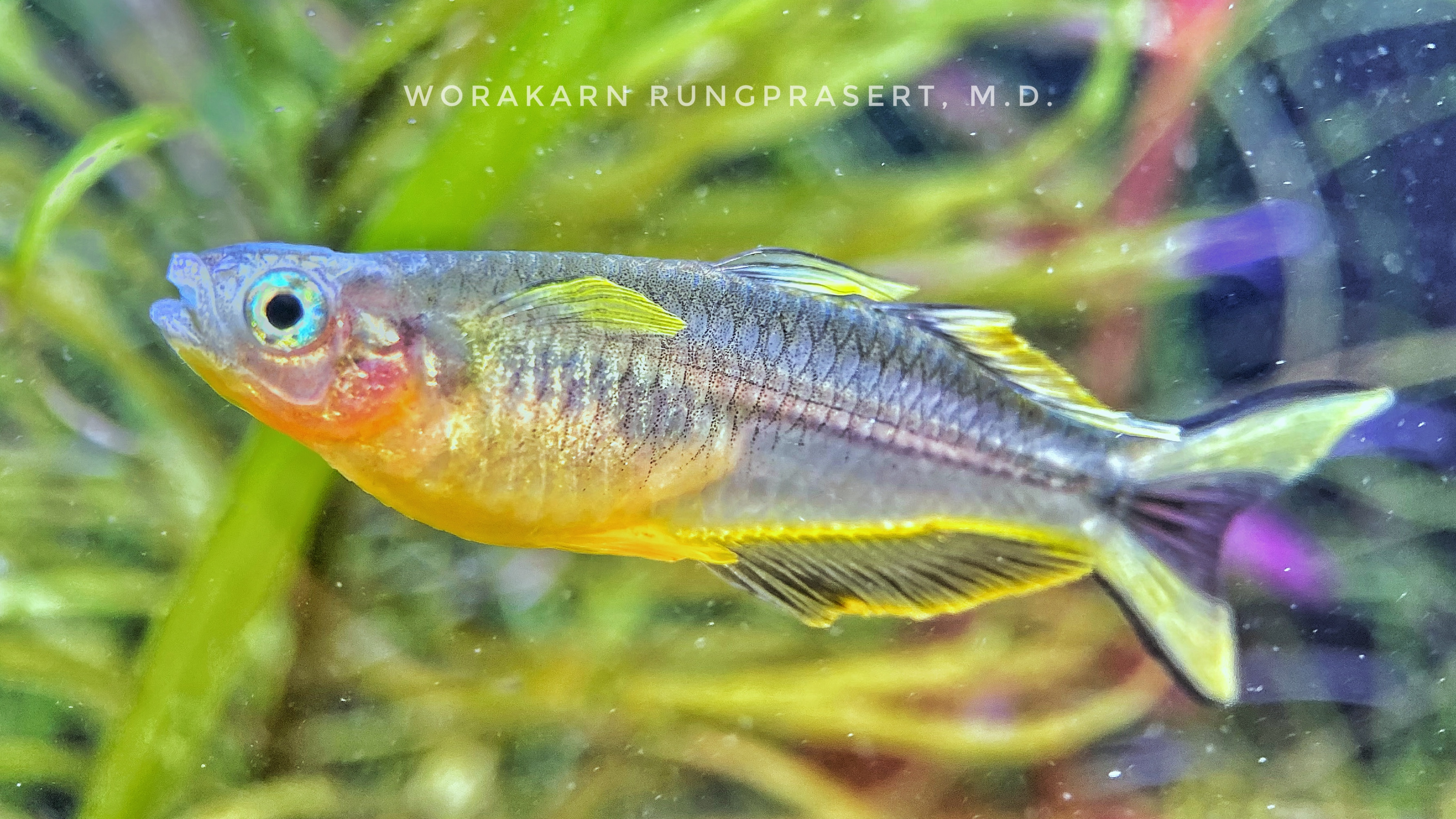

Conservation status
- Data Deficient (IUCN 3.1)

Scientific classification
- Kingdom: Animalia
- Phylum: Chordata
- Class: Actinopterygii
- Order: Atheriniformes
- Family: Pseudomugilidae
- Genus: Pseudomugil
- Species: P. furcatus

Binomial name
- Pseudomugil furcatus Nichols, 1955

Synonyms
- Popondetta furcata (Nichols, 1955); Popondichthys furcatus (Nichols, 1955)

= Forktail blue-eye =

Species of fish

The forktail blue-eye (Pseudomugil furcatus) is a species of freshwater ray-finned fish in the family Pseudomugilidae. It is endemic to Papua New Guinea, south-east of Popondetta, where it is found in rainforest streams. This species was once placed in the genus Popondetta, and even separated as Popondichthys, but these placements are now considered erroneous (and Popondetta and Popondichthys are now synonyms of Pseudomugil). This species may be found in the aquarium trade.
