= Vogelkop blue-eye =

Conservation status
- Critically Endangered (IUCN 3.1)

Scientific classification
- Kingdom: Animalia
- Phylum: Chordata
- Class: Actinopterygii
- Order: Atheriniformes
- Family: Pseudomugilidae
- Genus: Pseudomugil
- Species: P. reticulatus

Binomial name
- Pseudomugil reticulatus G. R. Allen & Ivantsoff, 1986

Species of fish

The Vogelkop blue-eye (Pseudomugil reticulatus) is a species of fish in the subfamily Pseudomugilinae (blue-eyes), which itself is a part of the Melanotaeniidae, or rainbowfishes. It is known from a single specimen, found in the middle of the Bird's Head or Vogelkop Peninsula, in the western part of the island of New Guinea.
