= Popondetta blue-eye =

Conservation status
- Endangered (IUCN 3.1)

Scientific classification
- Kingdom: Animalia
- Phylum: Chordata
- Class: Actinopterygii
- Order: Atheriniformes
- Family: Pseudomugilidae
- Genus: Pseudomugil
- Species: P. connieae

Binomial name
- Pseudomugil connieae (G. R. Allen, 1981)

Synonyms
- Popondetta connieae Allen, 1981; Popondichthys connieae (Allen, 1981)

Species of fish

The Popondetta blue-eye (Pseudomugil connieae) or Popondetta rainbowfish, is a species of fish in the subfamily Pseudomugilinae. It is endemic to Papua New Guinea where it occurs at three localities around Popondetta in the east of the country. This species inhabits clear, fast flowing freshwater streams, although it has been reported from brackish water. This species was described in 1981 as Popondetta connieae by Gerald R. Allen from a typelocality of Auga Creek, about 5 kilometres (3.1 miles) south of Popondetta where Allen collected the 200 types along with Brian Parkinson. Allen gave it the specific name connieae to honour his wife, Connie, who normally prepared Allen's manuscripts for publication. This species is sought after in the aquarium trade and is available in the European and Australian markets.
