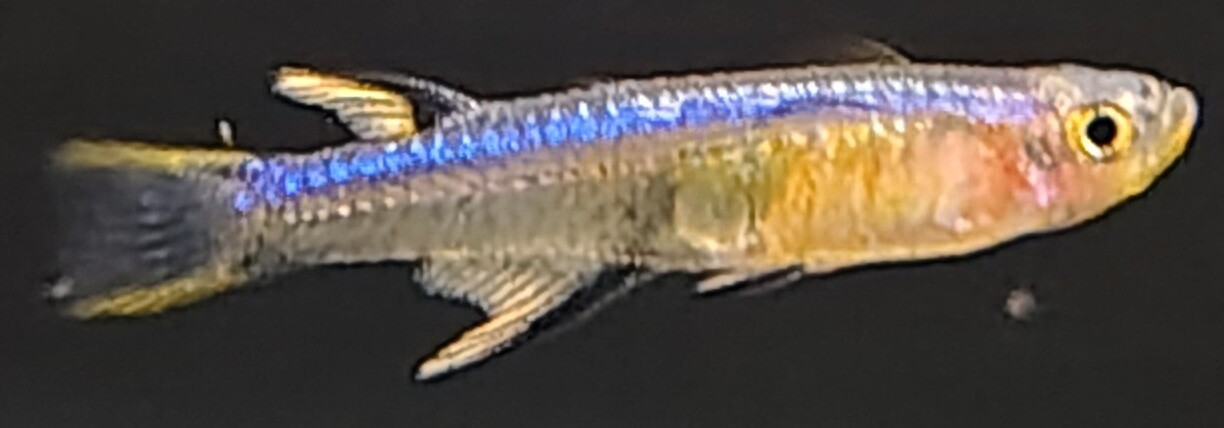
- A male Pseudomugil cyanodorsalis in an aquarium

Scientific classification
- Kingdom: Animalia
- Phylum: Chordata
- Class: Actinopterygii
- Order: Atheriniformes
- Family: Pseudomugilidae
- Genus: Pseudomugil
- Species: P. cyanodorsalis

Binomial name
- Pseudomugil cyanodorsalis G. R. Allen & Sarti, 1983

= Neon blue-eye =

Species of fish

The neon blue-eye (Pseudomugil cyanodorsalis) or blueback blue-eye, is a species of fish in the subfamily Pseudomugilinae. It is found in northern Australia, in the Gulf Country, the Kimberley and around Darwin. First described in 1983, they have become established in the aquarium trade worldwide.

== Description ==
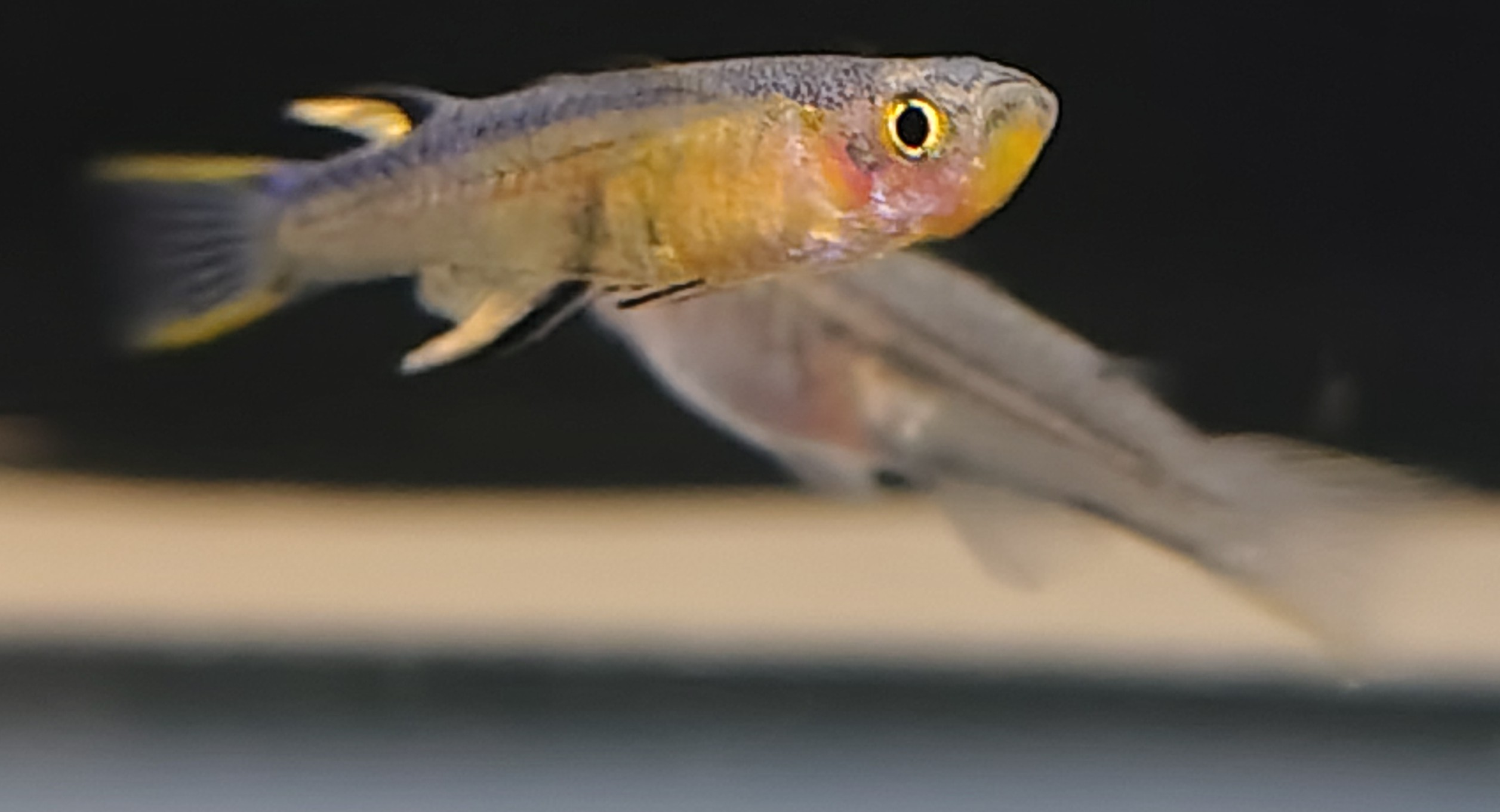
A pair of Pseudomugil cyanodorsalis, male in front

The Neon blue-eye is a small fish, attaining a total length of 3.5 centimetres (1.4 in). It is a sexually dimorphic species in which the males are colourful being a metallic blue on their backs, dotted with small black spots, a narrow black stripe along the centre of their flanks separates the blue back from the translucent to yellowish white lower half of their body. There is a small yellowish patch to the rear of the first dorsal fin and dusky leading edges to the fins. The females are plainer being semi-transparent silvery-grey with translucent fins and a white belly.

== Distribution ==
The neon blue-eye is found in northern Australia where it has a disjunct distribution from Crab Creek east of Broome and around Wyndham in Western Australia, in the Northern Territory they have been recorded between Darwin and the Cobourg Peninsula, as well as on Melville Island and in the basin of the Norman River on Queensland's Gulf of Carpentaria coast.

== Habitat and biology ==
The neon blue-eye is a euryhaline species which can tolerate a wide range of ecological conditions, although it shows a preference for muddy creeks lined with mangrove. It can also occur in pure freshwater habitats, especially during the monsoon. In the wild, the neon blue-eye is a seasonal breeder, with spawning usually taking place from October to December. They appear to prefer breeding in groups of multiple males and females, with the males using their dorsal and anal fins to display to the females while actively pursuing them. During display the color of both sexes becomes more intense. Females who are not receptive to breeding avoid the males by swimming near to the surface or by hiding among vegetation. The eggs are scattered among aquatic plants and stick to them by adhesive filaments on their outer coat. The eggs hatch in roughly 12–15 days.

This species is mainly a carnivore and they feed on terrestrial and aquatic insects, insect larvae, and small aquatic crustaceans.

== Discovery and naming ==
The neon blue-eye was first discovered by Helen K. Larson in 1981 near Darwin before Neil Sarti found it in Crab Creek near Broome a year later. In 1983 the species was formally described by Gerald R Allen and Neil Sarti in 1983 with Crab Creek given as the type locality.

== As an aquarium fish ==
The neon blue-eye were first made available to the aquarium hobby in Australia in 1982 but a sustainable breeding population did not become established. More wild caught specimens were brought into the hobby in 1986 and from these this species became widely available in the aquarium hobby worldwide.
