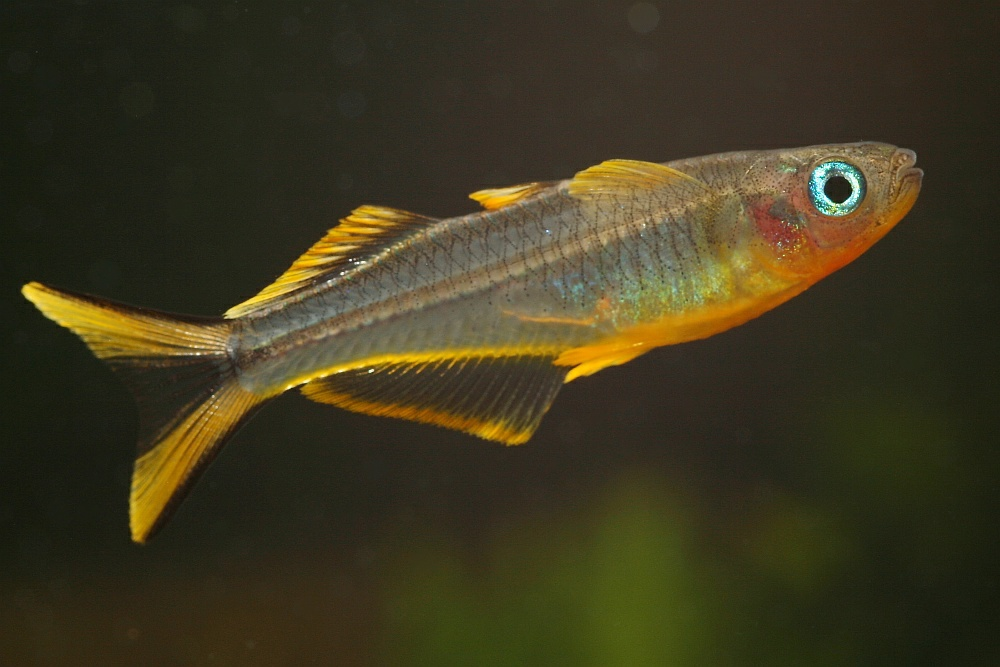
- Pseudomugil furcatus

Scientific classification
- Kingdom: Animalia
- Phylum: Chordata
- Class: Actinopterygii
- Division: Teleostei
- Order: Atheriniformes
- Family: Pseudomugilidae
- Genus: Pseudomugil; Kner, 1866

Type species
- Pseudomugil signifer Kner, 1866

Synonyms
- Popondetta Allen, 1980; Popondichthys Allen, 1987

= Pseudomugil =

Genus of fishes

Pseudomugil is a genus of fish in the family Pseudomugilidae endemic to Australia and New Guinea, where they are found in freshwater rivers and streams and bodies of brackish water.

== Description ==
Members of this genus have slender bodies and two dorsal fins. They are usually sexually dimorphic. The name of this genus is a combination of pseudo meaning "false" and mugil meaning "mullet", referring to the resemblance of the body shape of this genus to that of the unrelated mullets.

== Species ==
There are currently 17 recognized species in this genus:

- Pseudomugil connieae (G. R. Allen, 1981) (Popondetta blue-eye)
- Pseudomugil cyanodorsalis G. R. Allen & Sarti, 1983 (Neon blue-eye)
- Pseudomugil furcatus Nichols, 1955 (Fork-tail blue-eye)
- Pseudomugil gertrudae M. C. W. Weber, 1911 (Spotted blue-eye)
- Pseudomugil halophilus (Mangrove blue-eye)
- Pseudomugil inconspicuus T. R. Roberts, 1978 (Inconspicuous blue-eye)
- Pseudomugil ivantsoffi G. R. Allen & Renyaan, 1999 (Ivantsoff's blue-eye)
- Pseudomugil luminatus G. R. Allen, Unmack & Hadiaty, 2016 (Red Neon blue-eye)
- Pseudomugil majusculus Ivantsoff & G. R. Allen, 1984 (Cape blue-eye)
- Pseudomugil mellis G. R. Allen & Ivantsoff, 1982 (Honey blue-eye)
- Pseudomugil novaeguineae M. C. W. Weber, 1907 (New Guinea blue-eye)
- Pseudomugil paludicola G. R. Allen & R. Moore, 1981 (Swamp blue-eye)
- Pseudomugil paskai G. R. Allen & Ivantsoff, 1986 (Paska's blue-eye)
- Pseudomugil pellucidus G. R. Allen & Ivantsoff, 1998 (Transparent blue-eye)
- Pseudomugil reticulatus G. R. Allen & Ivantsoff, 1986 (Vogelkop blue-eye)
- Pseudomugil signifer Kner, 1866 (Pacific blue-eye)
- Pseudomugil tenellus W. R. Taylor, 1964 (Delicate blue-eye)

== See also ==
- Pseudomugil halophilus
