= Transparent blue-eye =

Conservation status
- Vulnerable (IUCN 3.1)

Scientific classification
- Kingdom: Animalia
- Phylum: Chordata
- Class: Actinopterygii
- Order: Atheriniformes
- Family: Pseudomugilidae
- Genus: Pseudomugil
- Species: P. pellucidus

Binomial name
- Pseudomugil pellucidus G. R. Allen & Ivantsoff, 1998

Species of fish

The transparent blue-eye (Pseudomugil pellucidus) is a species of fish in the subfamily Pseudomugilinae. It is found in Irian Jaya in New Guinea.This species reaches a length of 3.1 cm (1.2 in).
