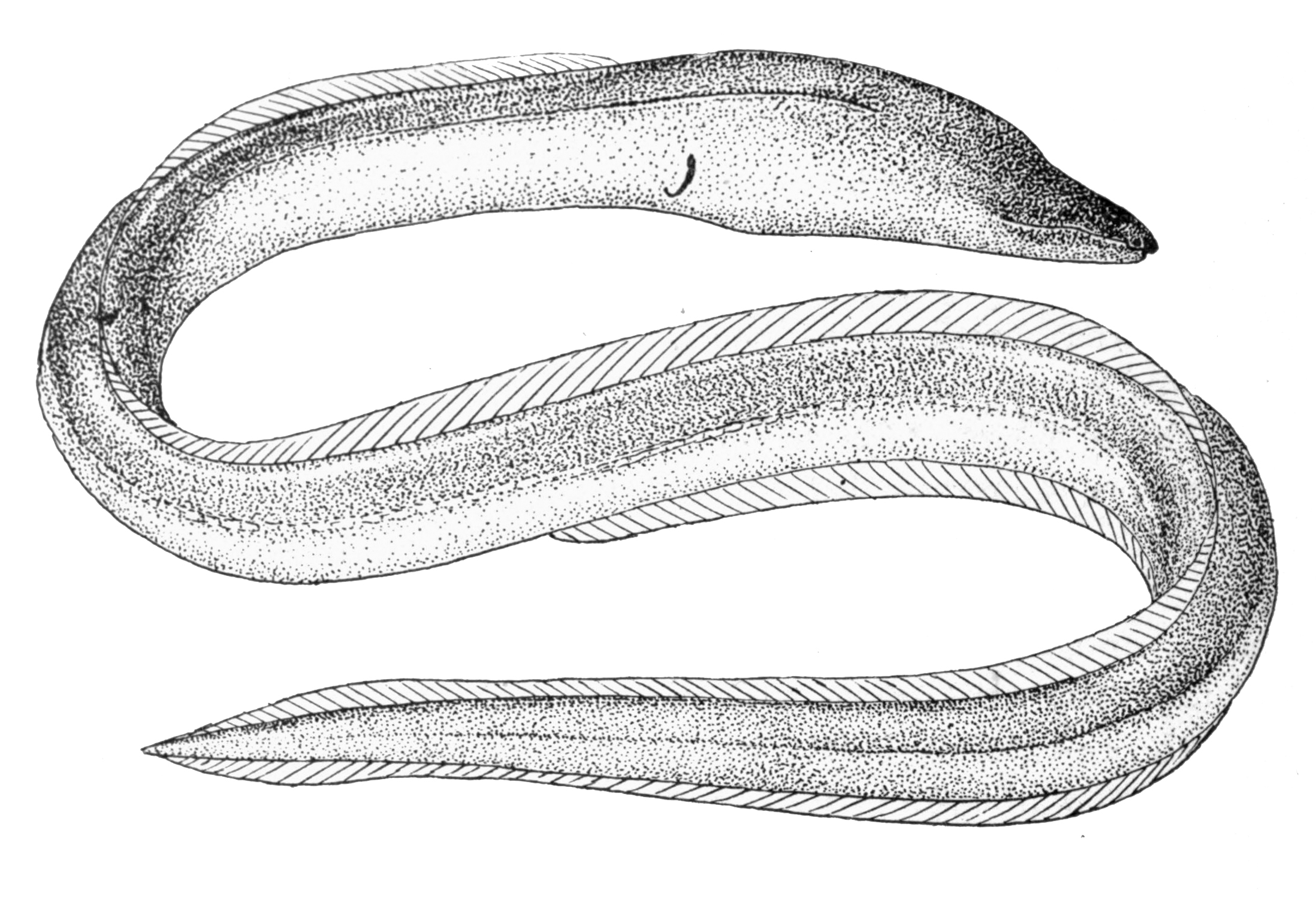
- Lamnostoma kampeni

Scientific classification
- Domain: Eukaryota
- Kingdom: Animalia
- Phylum: Chordata
- Class: Actinopterygii
- Order: Anguilliformes
- Family: Ophichthidae
- Subfamily: Ophichthinae
- Genus: Lamnostoma; Kaup, 1856

Type species
- Lamnostoma pictum Kaup, 1856

Species
- See text.

Synonyms
- Anguisurus Kaup, 1856

= Lamnostoma =

Genus of fishes

Lamnostoma is a genus of eels in the snake eel family Ophichthidae. It currently contains the following species:

- Lamnostoma kampeni (M. C. W. Weber & de Beaufort, 1916) (Freshwater snake-eel)
- Lamnostoma mindora (D. S. Jordan & R. E. Richardson, 1908)
- Lamnostoma orientalis (McClelland, 1844) (Oriental worm-eel)
- Lamnostoma polyophthalma (Bleeker, 1853) (Ocellated sand-eel)
- Lamnostoma taylori (Herre, 1923)
