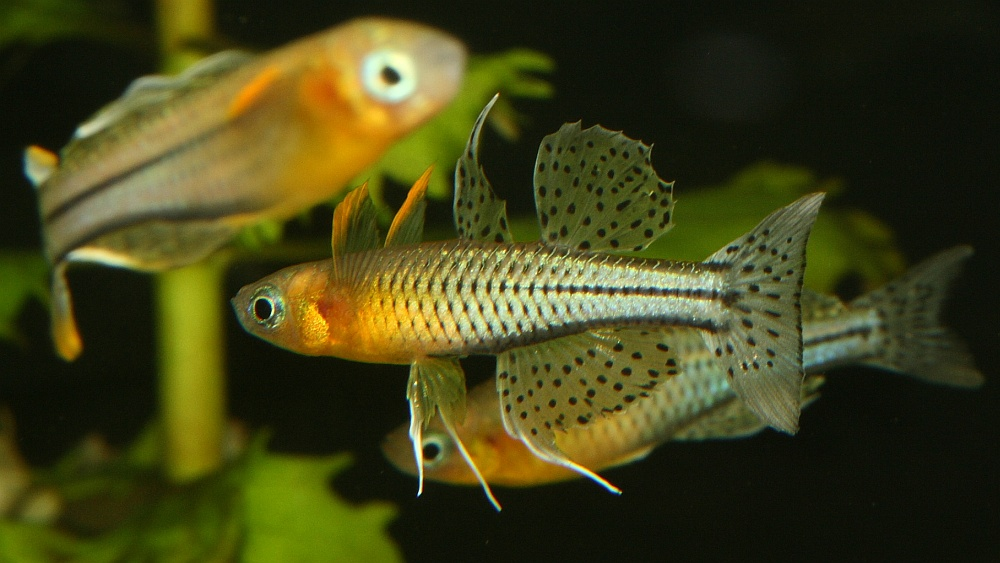

Scientific classification
- Kingdom: Animalia
- Phylum: Chordata
- Class: Actinopterygii
- Order: Atheriniformes
- Family: Pseudomugilidae
- Genus: Pseudomugil
- Species: P. gertrudae

Binomial name
- Pseudomugil gertrudae Weber, 1911

= Spotted blue-eye =

Species of fish

The spotted blue-eye (Pseudomugil gertrudae), also known as the delicate blue-eye, Gertrude's blue-eye, or northern blue-eye, is a species of freshwater ray-finned fish in the family Pseudomugilidae. It is native to Indonesia, Papua New Guinea and northern Australia. It adapts readily to captivity and can be kept in a small freshwater aquarium.

== Taxonomy ==
Max Carl Wilhelm Weber described Pseudomugil gertrudae in 1911 from specimens collected from Trangan Island, the Aru Islands (in Indonesia). He named it in honor of Gertrude Merton, the wife of the German zoologist Hugo Merton. The couple visited the Aru Islands in 1907–08, and the type of this species was collected then.

== Description ==
The spotted blue-eye has an elongated body generally up to 2.5 cm (1.0 in) in length; rarely, it may grow to 3 cm (1.2 in). The overall color is transparent to pale silver-white, sometimes with tints of tan or yellow. The rear half of the body is marked by three horizontal black lines (which break up into spots anteriorly), and the fins are yellow with black markings. Body size, color and shape vary across its range: for instance, fish from the Aru Islands are larger, those from the vicinity of Darwin have orange pectoral fins, while fish from Goanna Lagoon in Arnhem Land have an orange body.

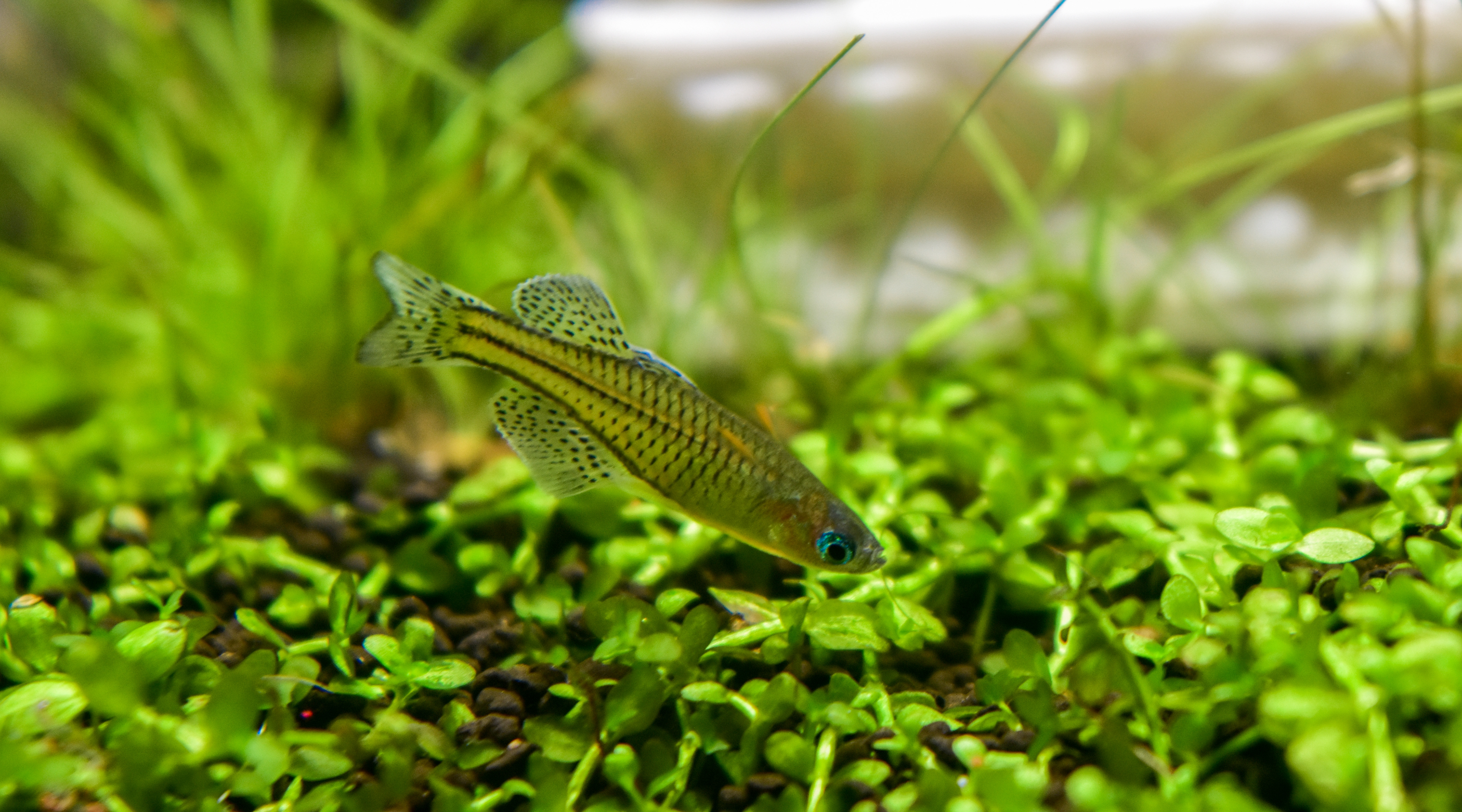

== Distribution and habitat ==
The spotted blue-eye is found in rivers in southern New Guinea, the Aru Islands, and the Northern Territory and Cape York Peninsula (Queensland) in Australia. Its habitat includes small slow-moving streams, often less than 60 cm (23.6 in) deep, pools, and Melaleuca or Pandanus swamps. It has been found in water with pH from 3.68 to 9.4.

== Feeding ==
Its diet has been little-studied, but algae and small invertebrates are believed to make up a large part of it.

== Reproduction ==
Little is known of the reproductive behavior of the spotted blue-eye in the wild, but it is believed to have a complex courtship behavior. In captivity, this species breeds readily.
