= Brustiarius =

Scientific classification
- Kingdom: Animalia
- Phylum: Chordata
- Class: Actinopterygii
- Order: Siluriformes
- Family: Ariidae
- Subfamily: Ariinae
- Genus: Brustiarius; Herre, 1935

Type species
- Brusitarius nox (Herre, 1935)

Genus of fishes

Brustiarius is a genus of freshwater sea catfishes found in the Malay Archipelago. There are currently three described species.

== Species ==
- Brustiarius nox (Herre, 1935) (Comb-gilled catfish)
- Brustiarius solidus (Herre, 1935) (Hard-palate catfish)
- Brustiarius utarus (Kailola, 1990) (Northern rivers catfish)
