= Delicate blue-eye =

Scientific classification
- Domain: Eukaryota
- Kingdom: Animalia
- Phylum: Chordata
- Class: Actinopterygii
- Order: Atheriniformes
- Family: Melanotaeniidae
- Genus: Pseudomugil
- Species: P. tenellus

Binomial name
- Pseudomugil tenellus W. R. Taylor, 1964

Species of fish

The delicate blue-eye (Pseudomugil tenellus) is a species of fish in the subfamily Pseudomugilinae. It is found in northern Australia and Papua New Guinea.
