= Ocellated sand-eel =

Conservation status
- Least Concern (IUCN 3.1)

Scientific classification
- Kingdom: Animalia
- Phylum: Chordata
- Class: Actinopterygii
- Order: Anguilliformes
- Family: Ophichthidae
- Genus: Lamnostoma
- Species: L. polyophthalma

Binomial name
- Lamnostoma polyophthalma (Bleeker, 1853)

Synonyms
- Dalophis polyophthalmus Bleeker, 1853; Caecula polyophthalmus (Bleeker, 1853); Lamnostoma polyophthalma (Bleeker, 1853); Anguisurus punctulatus Kaup, 1856

Species of fish

The ocellated sand-eel (Lamnostoma polyophthalma) is an eel in the family Ophichthidae (worm/snake eels). It was described by Pieter Bleeker in 1853.
