= Lamnostoma taylori =

Scientific classification
- Kingdom: Animalia
- Phylum: Chordata
- Class: Actinopterygii
- Order: Anguilliformes
- Family: Ophichthidae
- Genus: Lamnostoma
- Species: L. taylori

Binomial name
- Lamnostoma taylori (Herre, 1923)

Synonyms
- Caecula taylori Herre, 1923

Species of fish

Lamnostoma taylori is an eel in the family Ophichthidae (worm/snake eels). It was described by Albert William Herre in 1923, originally under the genus Caecula. It is a tropical, freshwater eel which is known from the Philippines in Asia, where it inhabits rivers near the sea. Males can reach a maximum standard length of 16.4 centimetres (6.5 in).

Named in honor of herpetologist Edward H. Taylor (1889–1978), Chief of Fisheries in the Philippines.
