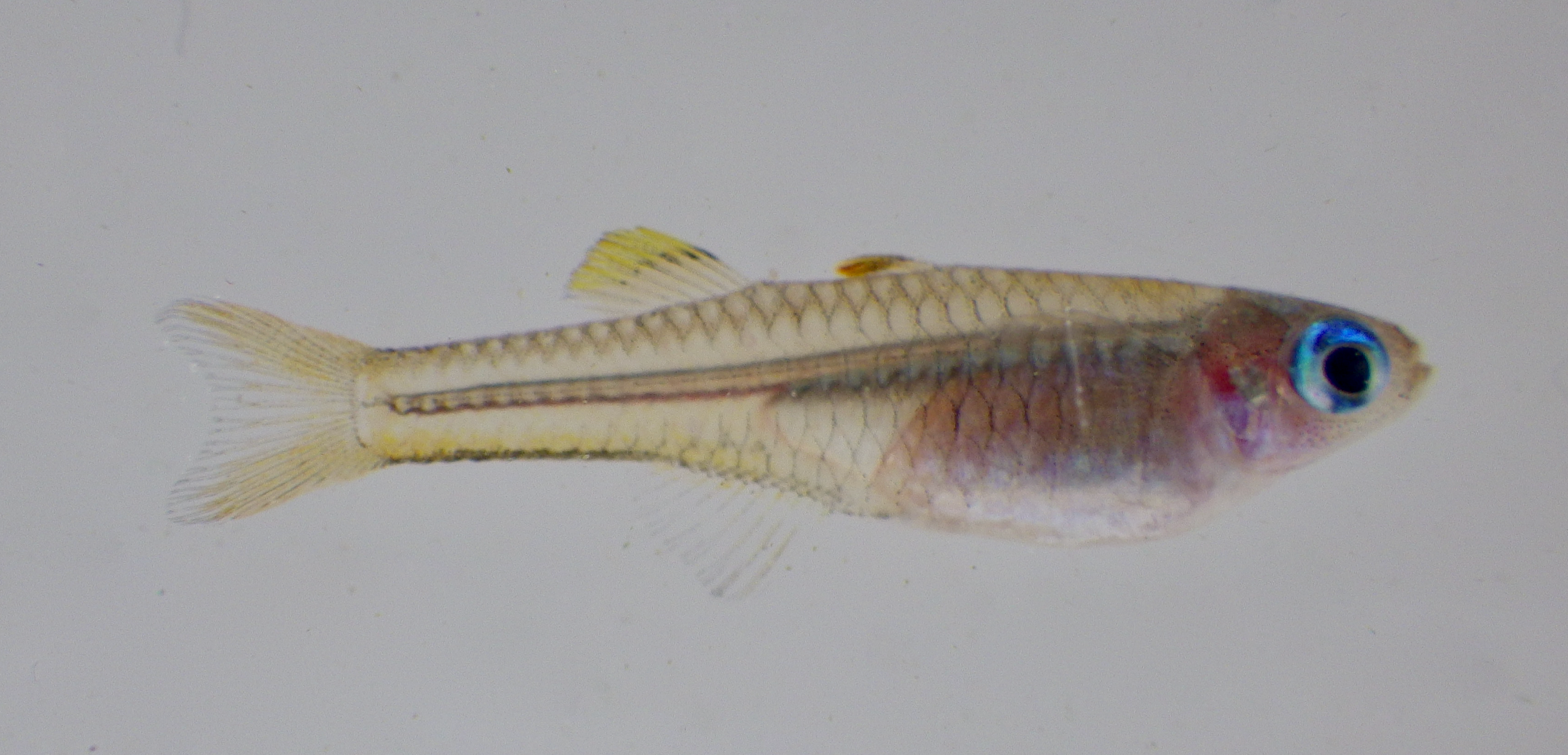

Scientific classification
- Kingdom: Animalia
- Phylum: Chordata
- Class: Actinopterygii
- Order: Atheriniformes
- Family: Pseudomugilidae
- Genus: Pseudomugil
- Species: P. ivantsoffi

Binomial name
- Pseudomugil ivantsoffi G. R. Allen & Renyaan, 1999

= Pseudomugil ivantsoffi =

Species of fish

Pseudomugil ivantsoffi is a species of blue-eye from the subfamily Pseudomugilinae, part of the rainbowfish family Melanotaeniidae. It is endemic to Western Papua in Indonesia. It was described in 1999 by Gerald R. Allen and Samuel J. Renyaan from types collected in southern Irian Jaya at two locations one a tributary of the Kopi River approximately 1 kilometre (0.62 miles) of the Tembagapura Road and from the mile 39 Camp of the Freeport Mining Company in 1995.

== Etymology ==
They named the species in honour of the ichthyologist Walter Ivantsoff of Macquarie University in Sydney.
