= Inconspicuous blue-eye =

Scientific classification
- Domain: Eukaryota
- Kingdom: Animalia
- Phylum: Chordata
- Class: Actinopterygii
- Order: Atheriniformes
- Family: Melanotaeniidae
- Genus: Pseudomugil
- Species: P. inconspicuus

Binomial name
- Pseudomugil inconspicuus T. R. Roberts 1978

Species of fish

The inconspicuous blue-eye (Pseudomugil inconspicuus) is a species of fish in the subfamily Pseudomugilinae. It is found in Papua New Guinea and Australia's Top End.
