= Swamp blue-eye =

Scientific classification
- Kingdom: Animalia
- Phylum: Chordata
- Class: Actinopterygii
- Order: Atheriniformes
- Family: Pseudomugilidae
- Genus: Pseudomugil
- Species: P. paludicola

Binomial name
- Pseudomugil paludicola G. R. Allen & R. Moore, 1981

Species of fish

The swamp blue-eye (Pseudomugil paludicola) is a species of fish in the subfamily Pseudomugilinae. It is found on the island of New Guinea, in southwestern Papua New Guinea and West Papua, Indonesia and Australia Cape York Peninsula mangroves creeks of the Mission river. This species reaches a length of 3.5 cm (1.4 in).
