= New Guinea blue-eye =

Scientific classification
- Domain: Eukaryota
- Kingdom: Animalia
- Phylum: Chordata
- Class: Actinopterygii
- Order: Atheriniformes
- Family: Melanotaeniidae
- Genus: Pseudomugil
- Species: P. novaeguineae

Binomial name
- Pseudomugil novaeguineae M. C. W. Weber, 1905

Species of fish

The New Guinea blue-eye (Pseudomugil novaeguineae) is a species of fish in the subfamily Pseudomugilinae. It is found in New Guinea and the Aru Islands. This species reaches a length of 3.6 cm (1.4 in).
