= Lamnostoma mindora =

Conservation status
- Least Concern (IUCN 3.1)

Scientific classification
- Kingdom: Animalia
- Phylum: Chordata
- Class: Actinopterygii
- Order: Anguilliformes
- Family: Ophichthidae
- Genus: Lamnostoma
- Species: L. mindora

Binomial name
- Lamnostoma mindora (Jordan & Richardson, 1908)

Synonyms
- Caecula mindora Jordan & Richardson, 1908; Sphagebranchus mindora (Jordan & Richardson, 1908); Coecula mindora Jordan & Richardson, 1908

Species of fish

Lamnostoma mindora is an eel in the family Ophichthidae (worm/snake eels). It was described by David Starr Jordan and Robert Earl Richardson in 1908. It is a tropical, freshwater eel which is known from Asia and Oceania, including the Philippines and New Guinea. Males can reach a maximum total length of 40 centimetres (16 in).
