= Pachyula =

Scientific classification
- Kingdom: Animalia
- Phylum: Chordata
- Class: Actinopterygii
- Order: Siluriformes
- Family: Ariidae
- Subfamily: Ariinae
- Genus: Pachyula; Ogilby, 1898

Genus of fishes

Pachyula is a genus of sea catfishes. These species originate from brackish and fresh waters of Irian Jaya, southern New Guinea. There are currently two described species in this genus.

== Species ==
- Pachyula conorhynchus (M. C. W. Weber, 1913) – Lorentz catfish
- Pachyula crassilabris (E. P. Ramsay & J. D. Ogilby, 1886) – thick-lipped catfish
