= Red neon blue-eye =

Scientific classification
- Kingdom: Animalia
- Phylum: Chordata
- Class: Actinopterygii
- Order: Atheriniformes
- Family: Pseudomugilidae
- Genus: Pseudomugil
- Species: P. luminatus

Binomial name
- Pseudomugil luminatus G. R. Allen, Unmack & Hadiaty, 2016

Species of fish

The red neon blue-eye (Pseudomugil luminatus) is a species of fish in the subfamily Pseudomugilinae. It has only been recorded from swamps in the vicinity of Timika in Papua, Indonesia.
