= Cochlefelis spatula =

Scientific classification
- Kingdom: Animalia
- Phylum: Chordata
- Class: Actinopterygii
- Order: Siluriformes
- Family: Ariidae
- Genus: Cochlefelis
- Species: C. spatula

Binomial name
- Cochlefelis spatula (Ramsay & Ogilby, 1886)

Synonyms
- Arius nudidens M. C. W. Weber, 1913; Arius spatula Ramsay & Ogilby, 1886

Species of fish

Cochlefelis spatula, the duckbilled catfish, alternatively spelled as the duck-billed catfish, is a species of catfish in the family Ariidae. It was described by Edward Pierson Ramsay and James Douglas Ogilby in 1886, originally under the genus Arius. It inhabits turbid freshwater rivers in New Guinea. It reaches a standard length of 60 cm (24 in). Its diet consists of prawns in the genera Caridina and Macrobrachium.
