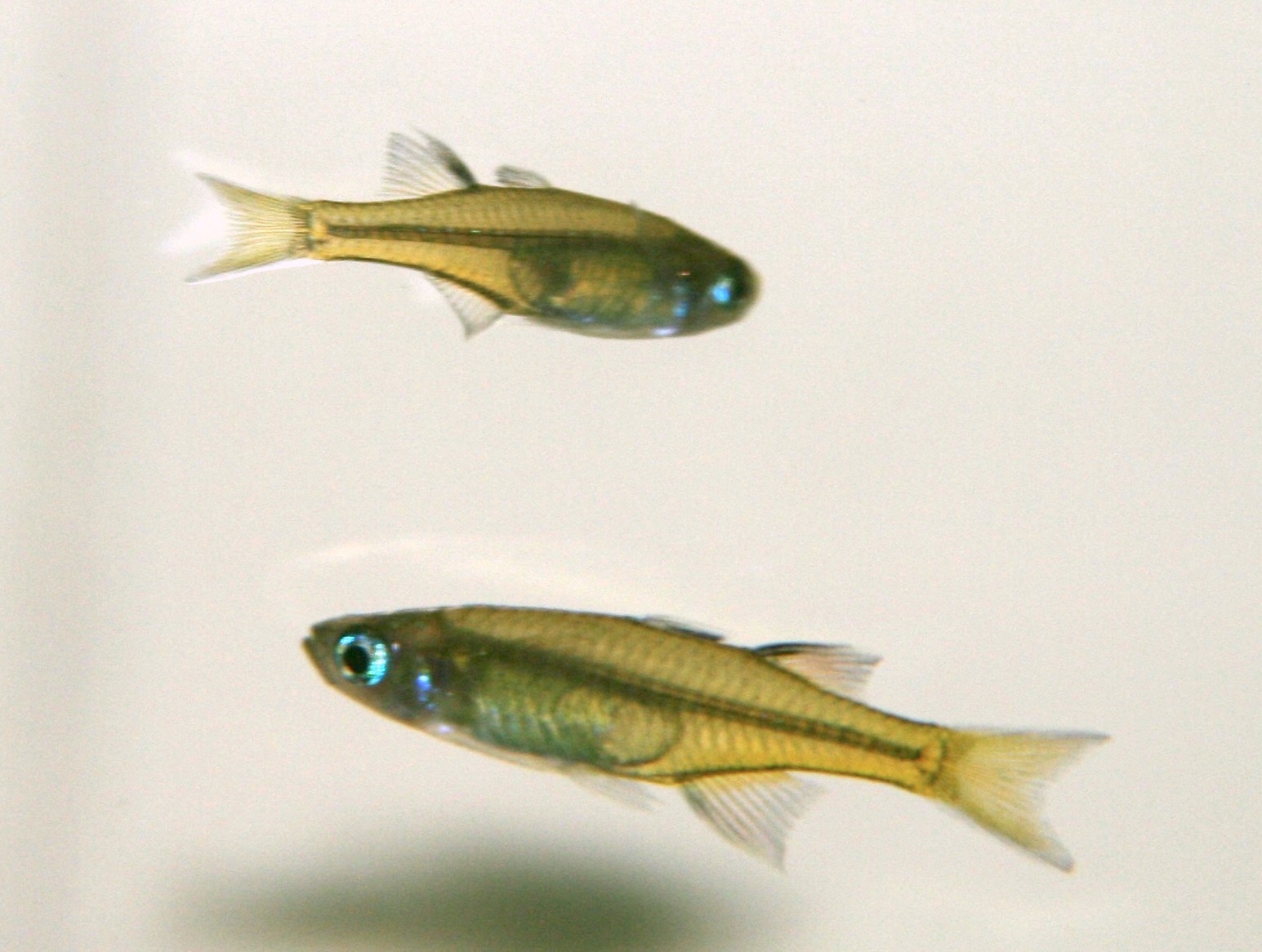

Conservation status
- Least Concern (IUCN 3.1)

Scientific classification
- Kingdom: Animalia
- Phylum: Chordata
- Class: Actinopterygii
- Order: Atheriniformes
- Family: Pseudomugilidae
- Genus: Pseudomugil
- Species: P. signifer

Binomial name
- Pseudomugil signifer Kner, 1866
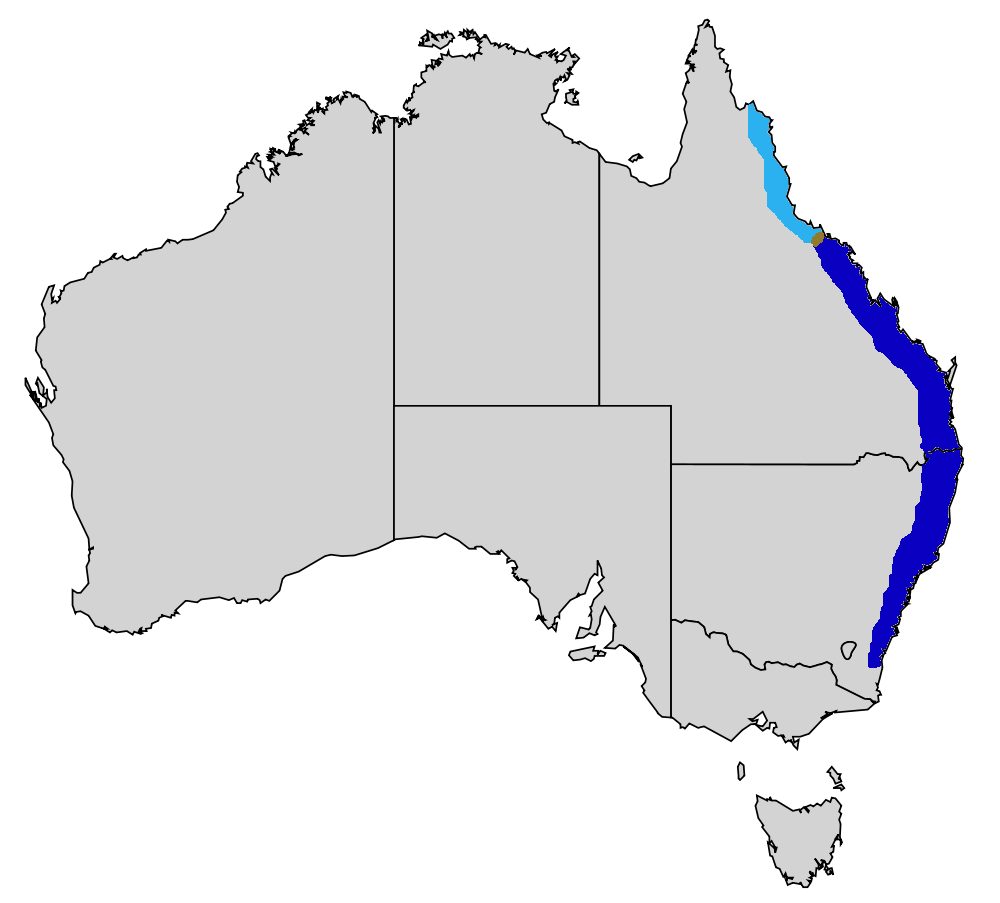
- subspecies signifer (dark blue) subspecies signata (light blue)

Synonyms
- Atherina signata Günther, 1867; Pseudomugil signata (Günther, 1867); Atherinosoma jamesonii Macleay, 1884

= Pacific blue-eye =

Species of fish

The Pacific blue-eye (Pseudomugil signifer) is a species of fish in the subfamily Pseudomugilinae native to eastern Australia. Described by Austrian naturalist Rudolf Kner in 1866, it comprises two subspecies that have been regarded as separate species in the past and may be once again with further study. It is a common fish of rivers and estuaries along the eastern seaboard from Cape York in North Queensland to southern New South Wales, the Burdekin Gap in central-north Queensland dividing the ranges of the two subspecies.

A small silvery fish averaging around 3.25 cm in total length (1 1/8–1 3/8 in), the Pacific blue-eye is recognisable by its blue eye-ring and two dorsal fins. It forms loose schools of tens to thousands of individuals. It eats water-borne insects as well as flying insects that land on the water's surface, foraging for them by sight. The Pacific blue-eye adapts readily to captivity.

== Taxonomy ==
Austrian naturalist Rudolf Kner described the species in 1866, from a specimen collected in Sydney in 1858 during the course of the Novara Expedition and taken to Vienna by the SMS Novara. German–British zoologist Albert Günther described Atherina signata from collections in Cape York in 1867. British entomologist William Sharp Macleay named a "curious little fish" collected from the Bremer River, a tributary of the Brisbane River, by one Mr Jameson of Ipswich, Atherinosoma jamesonii in 1884; it was later classified as the same species by Australian ichthyologist James Douglas Ogilby in 1908. Variable across its range, the Pacific blue-eye is considered to be a single species, though it has been split by some into northern signata and southern signifer, with the former found from Ross River northwards and the southern from the Calliope River. The division occurs at a biogeographic barrier known as the Burdekin Gap. In their 1919 monograph of the family Atherinidae, David Starr Jordan and Carl Leavitt Hubbs maintained the two as separate species—P. signifer and P. signata—based on the number of rays in the dorsal fins and differences in the filaments of males. Gilbert Whitley examined the species from the Low Isles off Cairns and maintained them as separate in 1935. In 1979, Hadfield and colleagues analysed the two species and felt that the variations within both species were greater than those between them and that no characteristics let people to distinguish either species. Hence, they recommended combining the species again. However, a 2002 and a further 2004 molecular study showed the two populations were genetically distinct and suggested that they may be once again reclassified as species. Species from the northern and southern extremes of the range do not appear to interbreed in hostile environment, suggesting that there may be two separate species within the current concept of the species. Alternative names include southern blue-eye and northern blue-eye.

Within the northern population, five distinct lineages (or subclades) have been identified: one from Ross River and Herbert River, a second from Johnstone, Barron and Tully Rivers, a third from Mulgrave/Russell River and Trinity Inlet, a fourth from Daintree and Mossman Rivers and a fifth from Low Isles and Cape Melville. Four subclades have been identified in the southern population: the first from the Don, Calliope, Pioneer and Kolan Rivers, the second from Burnett and Mary Rivers, the third from Pine River and the fourth from Clarence River southwards.

== Description ==
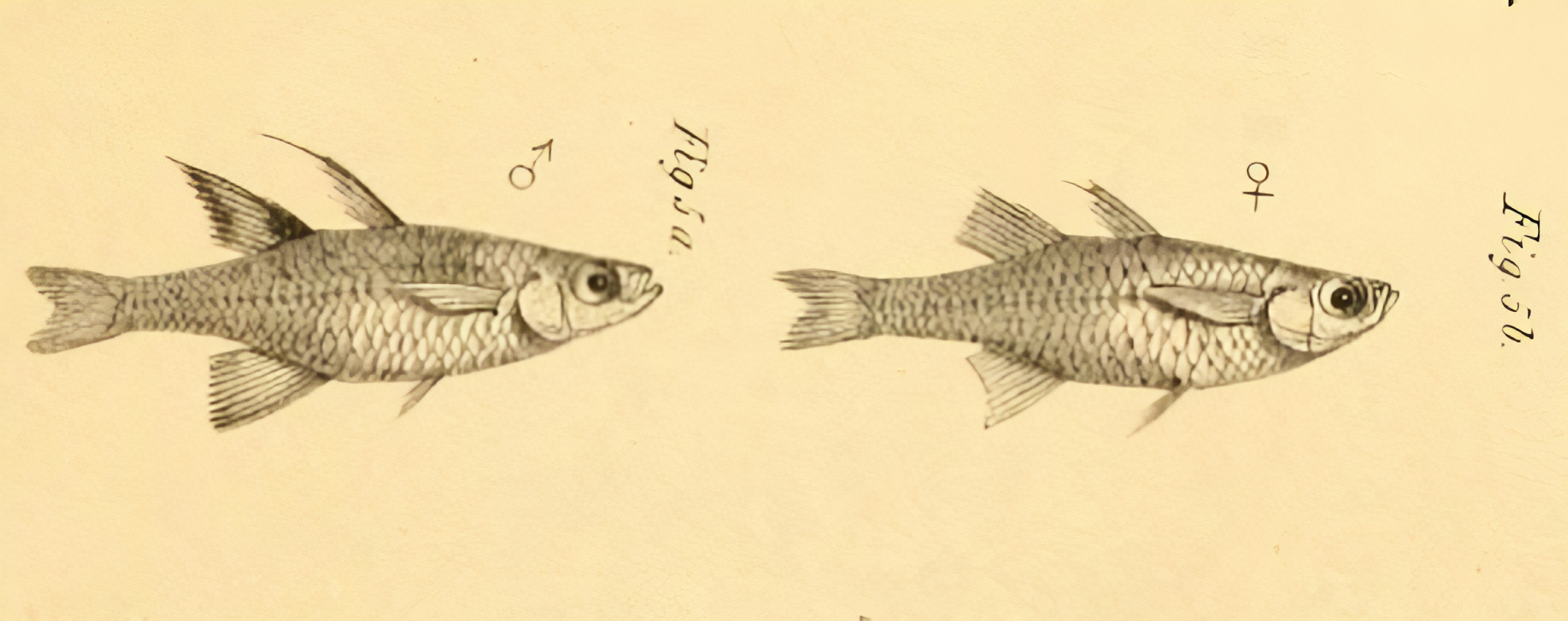
Pacific blue-eyes (P. signifer) anatomy and sexual dimorphism

The Pacific blue-eye generally reaches a total length of around 3–3.5 cm (1 1/8–1 3/8 in) long; males can reach 8.8 cm (3 1/2 in) and females 6.3 cm (2 1/2 in). The size of Pacific blue-eyes found north of the Burdekin Gap increases directly with distance from the gap, males and females being the same size. South of the Burdekin Gap, the species exhibits marked size difference between sexes, which becomes more pronounced as the distance from the gap increases. The elongate body is partly transparent and pale yellow or olive with a silver operculum and belly. The scales are relatively large and longer vertically than horizontally. The eye is large and has a blue iris. There are two dorsal fins, the first arising in line with or just posterior to the longest pectoral fin ray. The forked tail fin has rounded tips. The bottom and top edges of the tail fin are edged with white. The male has extended filaments on its dorsal, anal, and pelvic fins. There are black markings at the base of the anterior rays of the anal and rear dorsal fins, and the front (anterior edge) is sometimes white and the rear (posterior) edge greyish in colour. The male's fins may turn orange during the breeding season. Preserved specimens generally discolour to yellow or tan. The Pacific blue-eye can be distinguished from the highly invasive and noxious introduced eastern mosquitofish (Gambusia holbrooki) by its forked tail fin.

== Distribution and habitat ==
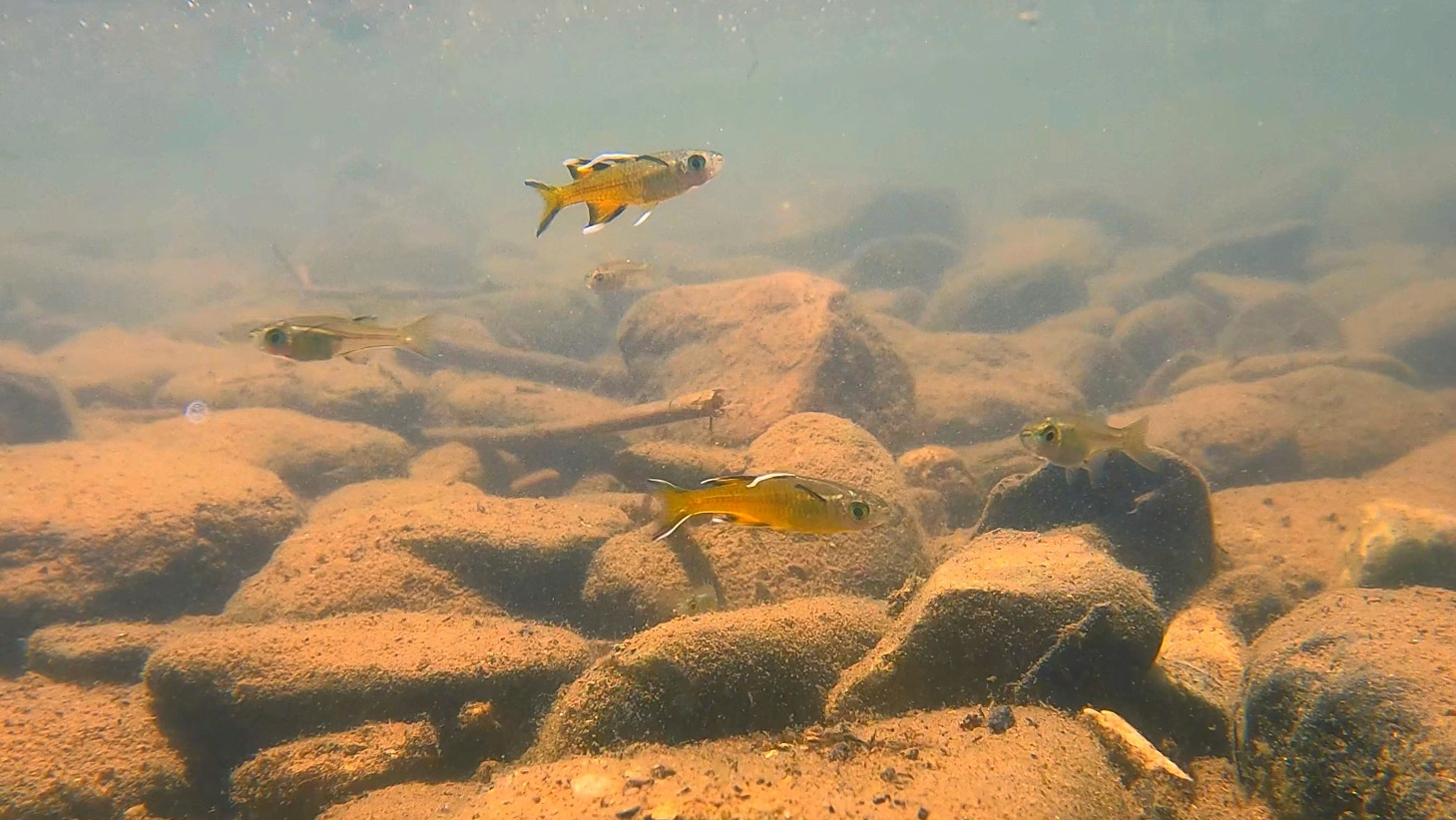
Pacific blue-eyes over a rocky substrate

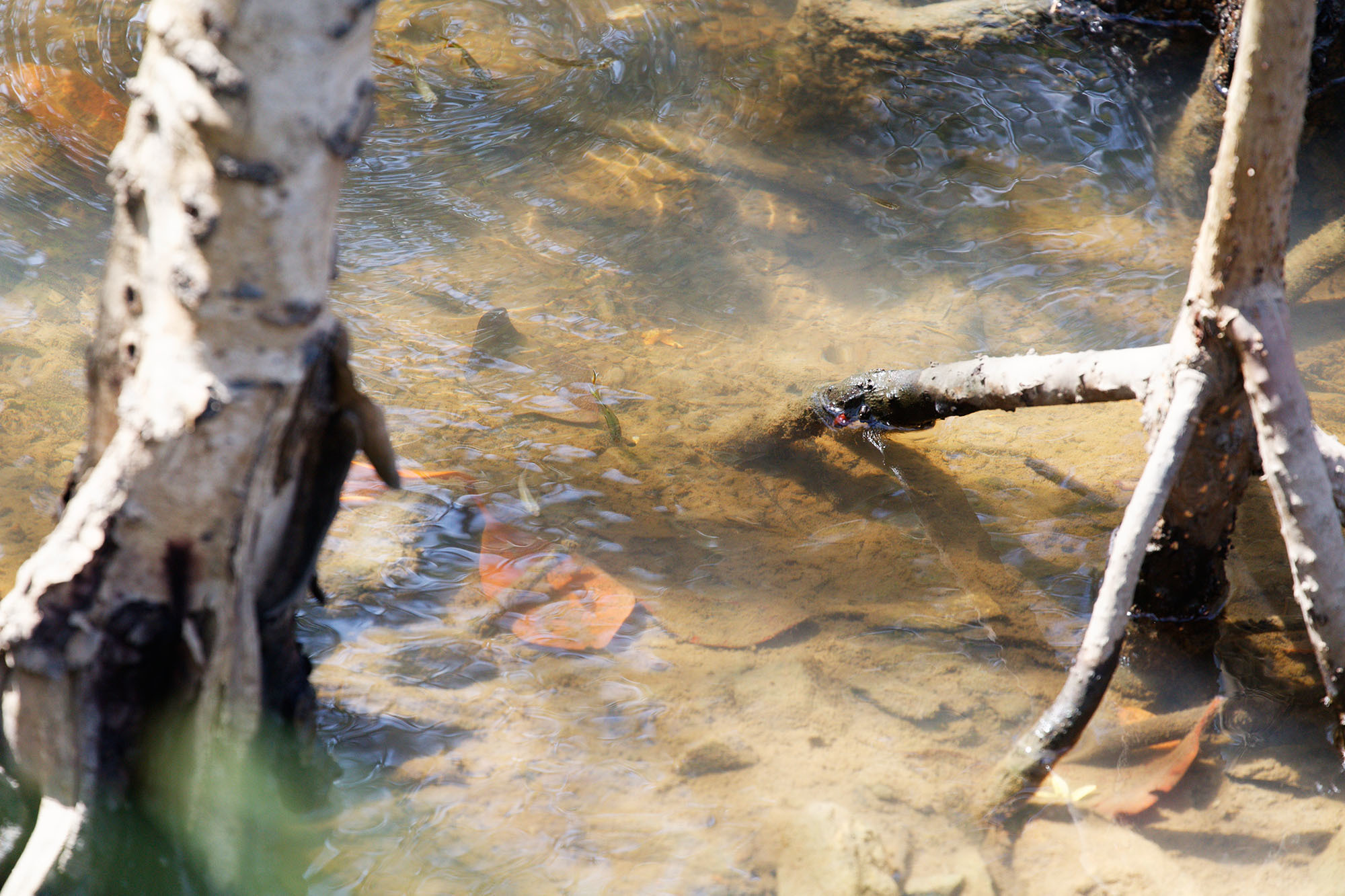
Pacific blue-eyes around mangrove roots

The Pacific blue-eye is found from Narooma in southern New South Wales north to the Rocky River in Cape York, though it is uncommon in eastern Cape York. It lives in small, generally slow-moving, streams to estuaries, as well as dune lagoons and salt marshes. It is also found in brackish and marine waters on some Queensland offshore islands such as Hinchinbrook Island, Lizard Island, Low Island, and Dunk Island. It has been recorded as far as 300 km (185 mi) upstream in the Mary and Dawson Rivers in Queensland. Numbers can be prolific in some locations, such as the Mary River. Conversely, it is uncommon in the Elliott and Kolan Rivers. Fish species it is commonly found with include Marjorie's hardyhead (Craterocephalus marjoriae), crimson-spotted rainbowfish (Melanotaenia duboulayi), Australian smelt (Retropinna semoni) and western carp gudgeon (Hypseleotris klunzingeri).

In the wet tropics, the Pacific blue-eye is mostly found in streams flowing up to 30 cm (12 in) per second, or rarely 90 cm (35 in) per second. Within fast-flowing areas, it shelters in areas of slower-moving water—less than 20 cm (8 in) per second—sometimes in the lower half of the water column or in the lee of underwater rocks. Further south in southeastern Queensland it is mostly found in water flowing more slowly than 10 cm (4 in) per second. It can also be found in tidal pools that become isolated from rivers at low tide. The Pacific blue-eye also forages in mangroves; a field study in the waters around Hinchinbrook Island and near Ingham on mainland Queensland nearby found that the species entered mangroves with the incoming tide as soon as the water was deep enough to swim in but left again an hour later as they kept to areas of shallow water. A field study in two lakes polluted by coal mine runoff in central Queensland found that the Pacific blue-eye was more resistant than tadpoles of the striped marsh frog (Limnodynastes peronii) to adverse health effects. The fish species did not suffer acutely but showed markers of compromised health in the long term.

== Behaviour ==
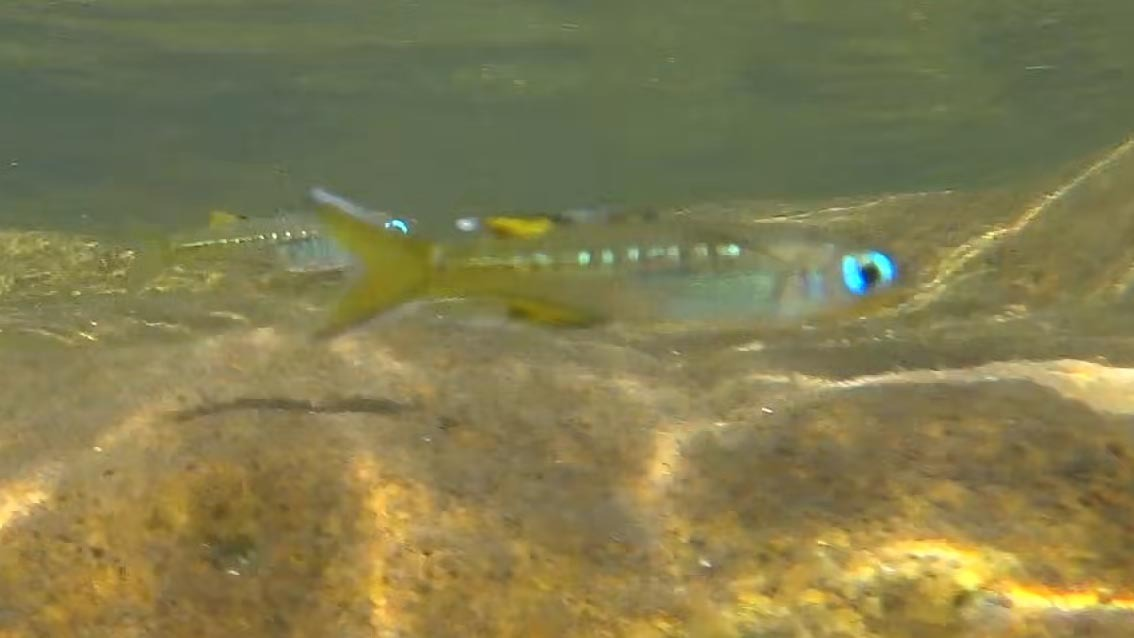
In Queensland

The Pacific blue-eye is found in loose schools of tens to thousands of fish. They are generally found in the middle to upper water column within 1 metre (3 ft) of the riverbank and often close to underwater cover. The Pacific blue-eye is euryhaline—it can survive in a wide range of water salinities from fresh-water to marine environments. It responds to changes in salinity (and the resulting change in buoyancy) by changing the volume of its swim bladder, which takes up to 6 hours and 40 minutes when salinity is reduced and around 5 hours when it is increased. In the meantime, the fish can swim with a head-up or head-down posture, which either increases or decreases buoyancy respectively. This adaptation helps the fish in the range of salinities it encounters in its estuarine environment.

In a school of Pacific blue-eyes that is threatened, a few individuals accelerate and change direction, which initiates an escape wave that spreads through the whole cohort. Animals are known to dart in random directions and speeds as an escape response when threatened. Pacific blue-eyes on their own dart in this manner for up to ten seconds after being faced with a threat at close range. This period is briefer when faced with more distant threats or for fish in schools.

== Breeding ==
Female Pacific blue-eyes are sexually mature at six months of age or when they have reached 2.3 cm (7/8 in) in standard length. Males are mature at 2.8 cm (1 1/8 in) standard length. A study published in 2003 showed that males will preferentially choose larger females—who are more fecund as a rule—unless more energy is required to do so, such as swimming further against a current. Fish can breed in fresh and saltwater. The life span of the species is around 1–2 years in the wild, and around 2–3 years in aquariums, though some males may reach 4 years of age. In an aquarium, Pacific blue-eyes spawn in gravel or moss at the base of aquatic plants. An experiment housing Pacific blue-eyes and mosquitofish together showed that the growth and breeding of the former fish were severely affected by the presence of the latter. The mechanism was unclear—there were some signs of direct aggression (bite marks on fins of Pacific blue-eyes) but stress from contact was thought to be a major factor.

== Feeding ==
The diet consists of water-based and terrestrial insects, flying insects, such as various types of fly, and, to a lesser extent, tiny crustaceans and algae. Field work on Narrabeen Lakes showed that Pacific blue-eyes spent time near the surface looking for dead flying insects, consuming anything below their mouth gape size. This varied from around 2.5 to 3.5 mm, and was proportional to the length of the fish. The Pacific blue-eye forages using vision, and the turbidity of the water affects its ability to find food.
