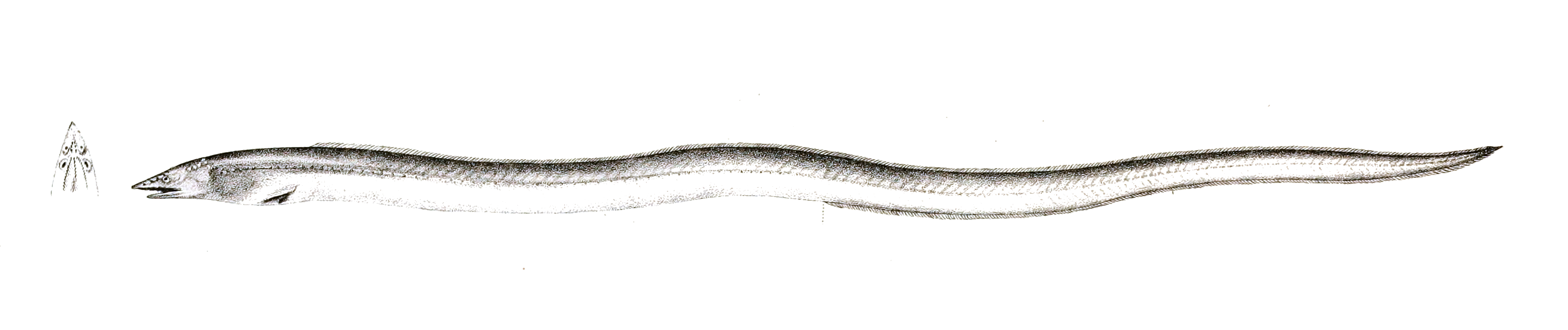

Conservation status
- Least Concern (IUCN 3.1)

Scientific classification
- Kingdom: Animalia
- Phylum: Chordata
- Class: Actinopterygii
- Order: Anguilliformes
- Family: Ophichthidae
- Genus: Lamnostoma
- Species: L. orientalis

Binomial name
- Lamnostoma orientalis (McClelland, 1844)

Synonyms
- Dalophis orientalis McClelland, 1844; Ophichthys orientalis (McClelland, 1844); Sphagebranchus orientalis (McClelland, 1844); Lamnastoma orientalis (McClelland, 1844); Lamnosoma orientalis (McClelland, 1844); Lamnostomus orientalis (McClelland, 1844); Lamnostoma pictum Kaup, 1856

= Oriental worm-eel =

Species of fish

The Oriental worm-eel (Lamnostoma orientalis), also known as the Oriental snake eel, the Oriental sand-eel or the finny sand-eel, is an eel in the family Ophichthidae (worm/snake eels). It was described by John McClelland in 1844, originally under the genus Dalophis. It is a tropical, marine and freshwater-dwelling eel which is known from the Indo-Western Pacific, including Somalia, South Africa, India, Papua New Guinea, Tahiti, French Polynesia, Indonesia, Oman, Palau, New Caledonia, the Philippines, Sri Lanka, Seychelles, and Vanuatu. It dwells at a depth range of 0 to 3 metres (0.0 to 9.8 ft), and forms burrows in sand and mud sediments in estuaries, rivers, and inshore turbid waters. Males can reach a maximum total length of 36 centimetres (14 in), but more commonly reach a TL of 25 centimetres (9.8 in).

The Oriental worm-eel is of minor commercial interest to fisheries; it is caught by hand and in nets, and is sold fresh, usually as bait. Its diet consists of invertebrates, small fish and prawns. The IUCN redlist currently lists it as Least Concern, due to its wide distribution and lack of reported threats. It notes, however, that freshwater pollution occurs in its range, and could pose a threat to the species.
