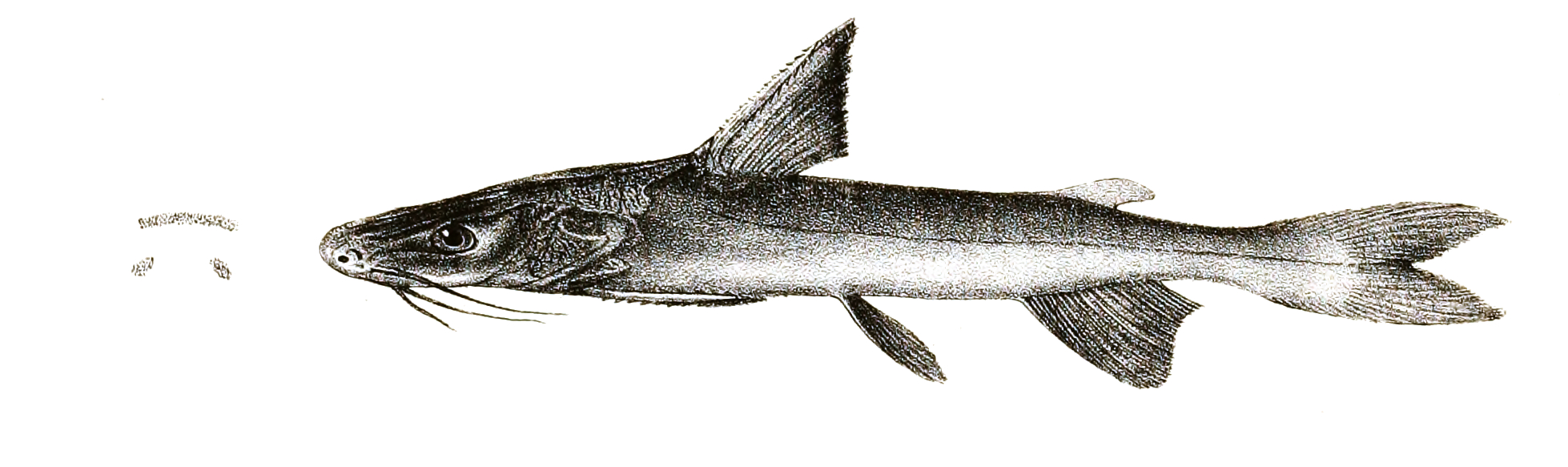
- Cochlefelis burmanicus

Scientific classification
- Kingdom: Animalia
- Phylum: Chordata
- Class: Actinopterygii
- Division: Teleostei
- Order: Siluriformes
- Family: Ariidae
- Subfamily: Ariinae
- Genus: Cochlefelis; Whitley, 1941

= Cochlefelis =

Genus of fishes

Cochlefelis is a genus of sea catfishes found in coastal and freshwaters from Southeast Asia to Australia. There are currently three described species in this genus.

== Species ==
- Cochlefelis danielsi (Regan, 1908) (Daniel's catfish)
- Cochlefelis insidiator (Kailola, 2000) (flat catfish)
- Cochlefelis spatula (E. P. Ramsay & J. D. Ogilby, 1886) (duckbilled catfish)
