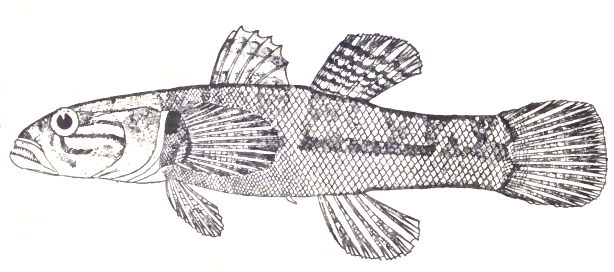
- Belobranchus belobranchus

Scientific classification
- Kingdom: Animalia
- Phylum: Chordata
- Class: Actinopterygii
- Order: Gobiiformes
- Family: Eleotridae
- Genus: Belobranchus; Bleeker, 1856

Type species
- Eleotris quoyi Bleeker, 1856

= Belobranchus =

Genus of fishes

Belobranchus is a small genus of Eleotrid sleeper gobies from south-east Asia, New Guinea and the western Pacific.

== Species ==
The genus was considered to be a monotypic taxon until the description of Belobranchus segura in 2012. The two species in the genus are:

- Belobranchus belobranchus (Valenciennes, 1837)
- Belobranchus segura Keith, Hadiaty & Lord, 2012
