= Cochlefelis insidiator =

Conservation status
- Data Deficient (IUCN 3.1)

Scientific classification
- Kingdom: Animalia
- Phylum: Chordata
- Class: Actinopterygii
- Order: Siluriformes
- Family: Ariidae
- Genus: Cochlefelis
- Species: C. insidiator

Binomial name
- Cochlefelis insidiator (Kailola, 2000)

Synonyms
- Arius insidiator Kailola, 2000; Hemiarius insidiator (Kailola, 2000)

Species of fish

Cochlefelis insidiator, the flat catfish, is a species of catfish in the family Ariidae. It was described by Patricia J. Kailola in 2000, originally under the genus Arius. It occurs in rivers, mudflats and marine waters on the coasts of Papua New Guinea and Australia. It reaches a standard length of 35 cm (14 in).
