= Belobranchus segura =

Conservation status
- Least Concern (IUCN 3.1)

Scientific classification
- Kingdom: Animalia
- Phylum: Chordata
- Class: Actinopterygii
- Division: Teleostei
- Order: Gobiiformes
- Family: Eleotridae
- Genus: Belobranchus
- Species: B. segura

Binomial name
- Belobranchus segura Keith, Hadiaty & Lord, 2012

Species of fish

Belobranchus segura

Conservation status
- Least Concern (IUCN 3.1)

Scientific classification
- Kingdom: Animalia
- Phylum: Chordata
- Class: Actinopterygii
- Division: Teleostei
- Order: Gobiiformes
- Family: Eleotridae
- Genus: Belobranchus
- Species: B. segura

Binomial name
- Belobranchus segura Keith, Hadiaty & Lord, 2012

Belobranchus segura is a species of amphidromous ray-finned fish belonging to the family Eleotridae, the spinycheek sleepers or bullies. This species is found in eastern Asia and Melanesia.

== Taxonomy ==
Belobranchus segura was first formally described in 2012 by Philippe Keith, Renny Kurnia Hadiaty and Clara Lord with its type locality given as Ake Jira, Leililef Waibulen, Halmahera, Indonesia. This species is classified in the genus Belobranchus which was described in 1856 by Pieter Bleeker with Belobranchus quoyi as its type species, and another species described by him B. taeniopterus was included. Both B. quoyi and B. taeniopterus are now considered to be a junior synonyms of E. belobrancha, with B. quoyi being an unneeded replacement name for E. belobrancha. The genus Belobranchus is classified in the family Eleotridae which is classified within the suborder Gobioidei, the gobies, of the order Gobiiformes, which also includes the cardinalfishes and sand divers.

== Etymology ==
Belobranchus segura is a species in the genus Belobranchus, a name that is a tautonym for E. belobrancha. This name combines belos, meaning "arrow", with branchia, meaning "gills", and allusion to the branchiostegal rays, which merge into a spine anteriorly. The specific name segura, honours the French hydrobiologist Gilles Ségura, a frend of the authors and in recognition of his “extensive and enthusiastic work on freshwater fauna”.

== Description ==
Belobranchus segura has an elongated body shape and it reaches a maximum standard length of 8 cm (3.1 in). The dorsal fins have a total of 7 spines and 7 soft rays and the anal fin has 1 spone and 7 soft rays. It is reddish brown with red brown with yellowish to orange second dorsal, anal, pectoral and caudal fins. The first dorsal fin is orange on its distal part while the middle and lower parts are spotty greyish to black but there are no spots on caudal fin.

== Distribution and habitat ==
Belobranchus segura has been recorded from Panay in the Philippines, Halmahera, Lombok, Sulawesi and West Papua in Indonesia, Solomon Islands, New Britain in Papua New Guinea and Vanuatu. It is an anadromous species in which the eggs are laid over rocky and gravel bottoms in freshwater streams. The free-swimming larvae then drift downstream to the sea where they undergo a planktonic stage before migrating up streams to mature and breed. It feeds on small crustaceans and fish.
