= Comb-gilled catfish =

Scientific classification
- Domain: Eukaryota
- Kingdom: Animalia
- Phylum: Chordata
- Class: Actinopterygii
- Order: Siluriformes
- Family: Ariidae
- Genus: Brustiarius
- Species: B. nox

Binomial name
- Brustiarius nox (Herre, 1935)

Synonyms
- Arius nox Herre, 1935

Species of fish

The comb-gilled catfish (Brustiarius nox) is a species of sea catfish in the family Ariidae. It was described by Albert William Herre in 1935, originally under the genus Arius. It is a tropical freshwater fish which is found in Papua New Guinea. It reaches a maximum standard length of 30 cm (12 in).

The comb-gilled catfish feeds on a variety of small aquatic animals, including crustaceans, worms, leeches, insects as well as larvae and nymphs, and gastropods. It also feeds on algae and detritus. Adults spawn year round, laying eggs in quantities generally ranging from 8-30, which are then orally incubated.
