= Lorentz catfish =

Conservation status
- Least Concern (IUCN 3.1)

Scientific classification
- Kingdom: Animalia
- Phylum: Chordata
- Class: Actinopterygii
- Order: Siluriformes
- Family: Ariidae
- Genus: Pachyula
- Species: P. conorhynchus

Binomial name
- Pachyula conorhynchus (M. C. W. Weber, 1913)

Synonyms
- Tetranesodon conorhynchus M. C. W. Weber, 1913; Cinetodus conorhynchus (M. C. W. Weber, 1913)

Species of fish

The Lorentz catfish (Pachyula conorhynchus) is a species of sea catfish endemic to West Papua in Indonesia where it is known from the Lorentz River and Fly River systems.
