= Burdekin Gap =

The Burdekin Gap, named for the Burdekin River, is a biogeographical feature in Queensland, northeastern Australia, which separates populations of freshwater fishes and other water-dependent land animals, such as the delicate skink (Lampropholis delicata), by a corridor of hot and dry habitat that acts as a barrier to genetic exchange. Birds, except those that are rainforest-dependent, are more likely to intergrade across the Burdekin Gap.
