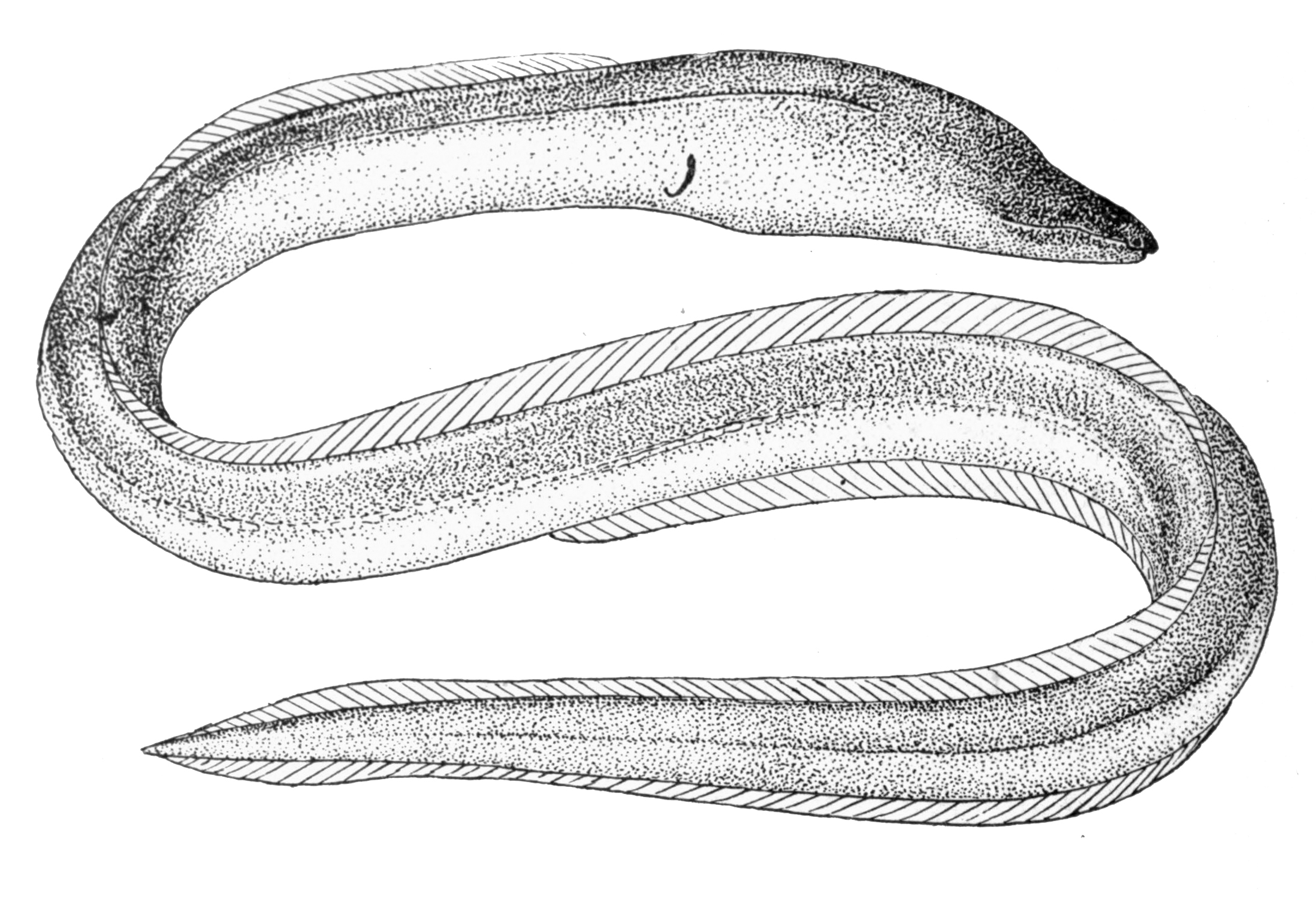

Conservation status
- Least Concern (IUCN 3.1)

Scientific classification
- Kingdom: Animalia
- Phylum: Chordata
- Class: Actinopterygii
- Order: Anguilliformes
- Family: Ophichthidae
- Genus: Lamnostoma
- Species: L. kampeni

Binomial name
- Lamnostoma kampeni (Weber & de Beaufort, 1916)

Synonyms
- Brachysomophis kampeni Weber & de Beaufort, 1916; Achirophichthys kampeni (Weber & de Beaufort, 1916)

= Freshwater snake-eel =

Species of fish

The freshwater snake-eel (Lamnostoma kampeni) is an eel in the family Ophichthidae (worm/snake eels). It was described by Max Carl Wilhelm Weber and Lieven Ferdinand de Beaufort in 1916. It is a tropical, freshwater eel which is known from Asia and Oceania, including New Caledonia, New Guinea, the Philippines, and Vanuatu. Males can reach a maximum total length of 41 centimetres.
