= Arius nudidens =

Scientific classification
- Domain: Eukaryota
- Kingdom: Animalia
- Phylum: Chordata
- Class: Actinopterygii
- Order: Siluriformes
- Family: Ariidae
- Genus: Arius
- Species: A. nudidens

Binomial name
- Arius nudidens Weber, 1913

Species of fish

Arius nudidens is a species of sea catfish in the family Ariidae. It was described by Max Carl Wilhelm Weber in 1913. It is known from freshwater in New Guinea and Indonesia.
