= Brustiarius utarus =

Conservation status
- Least Concern (IUCN 3.1)

Scientific classification
- Kingdom: Animalia
- Phylum: Chordata
- Class: Actinopterygii
- Order: Siluriformes
- Family: Ariidae
- Genus: Brustiarius
- Species: B. utarus

Binomial name
- Brustiarius utarus (Kailola, 1990)

Synonyms
- Arius utarus Kailola, 1990; Ariopsis utarus (Kailola, 1990); Neoarius utarus (Kailola, 1990)

Species of fish

Brustiarius utarus, the northern rivers catfish or salmon catfish, is a species of catfish in the family Ariidae. It was described by Patricia J. Kailola in 1990, originally under the genus Arius. It inhabits freshwater bodies in Indonesia and Papua New Guinea.

Its diet includes finfish, detritus, terrestrial invertebrates, and caridean shrimp such as those in the genus Macrobrachium.

Brustiarius utarus reaches a maximum known standard length of 55 cm (22 in), but usually reaches an SL of 30 cm (12 in). It reaches a maximum weight of 1.7 kg (3 lb 12 oz). It closely resembles Bleekeriella leptaspis, and is frequently mistaken for it.

Brustiarius utarus spawns throughout the year. It is harvested by subsistence fisheries.
