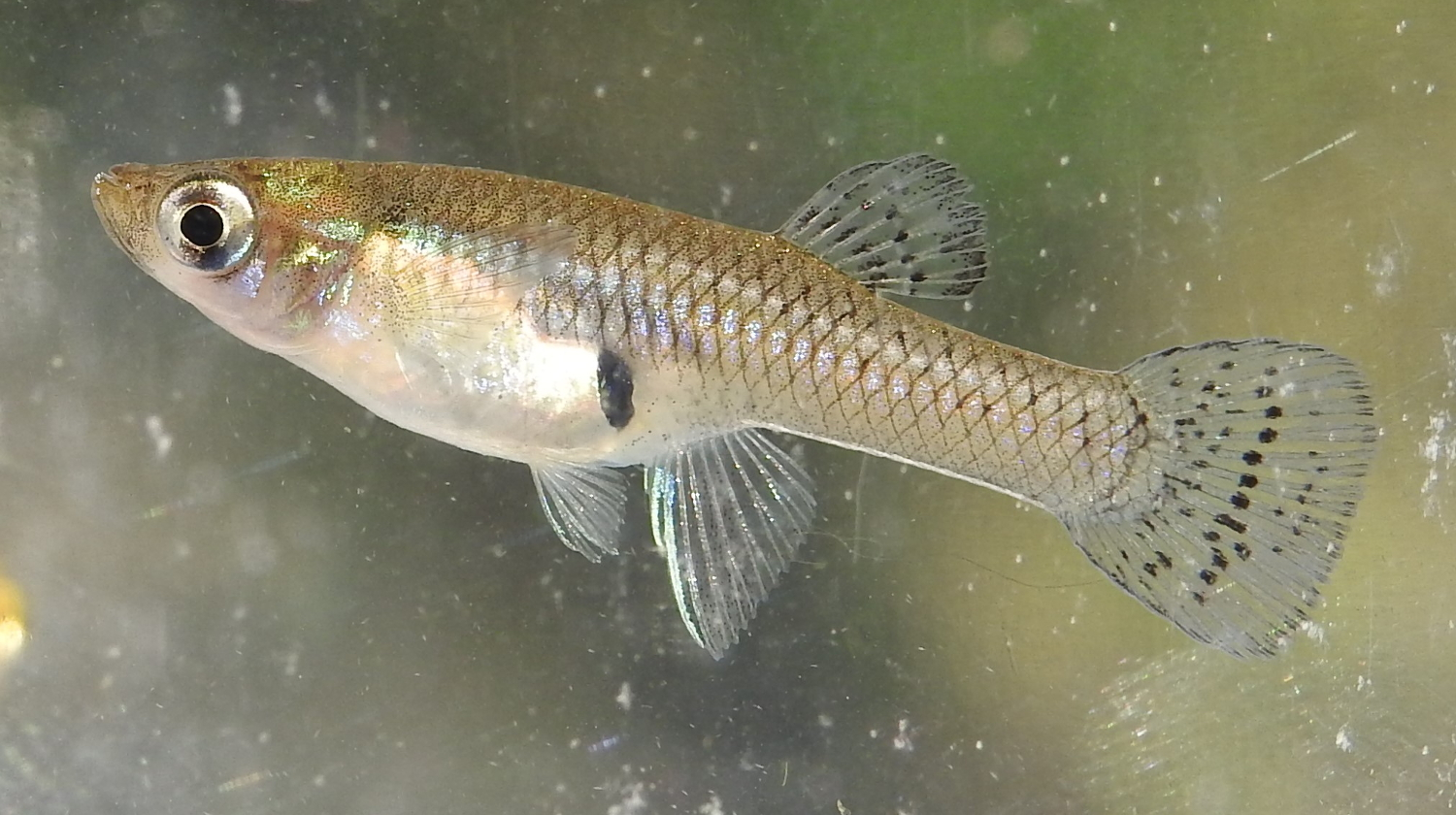
- Female
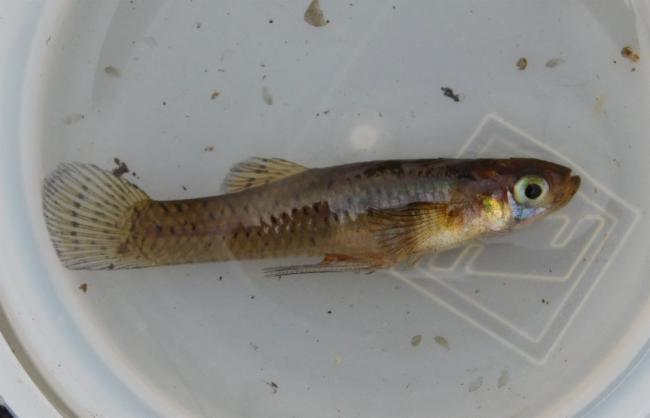
- Male

Conservation status
- Least Concern (IUCN 3.1)

Scientific classification
- Kingdom: Animalia
- Phylum: Chordata
- Class: Actinopterygii
- Division: Teleostei
- Order: Cyprinodontiformes
- Family: Poeciliidae
- Genus: Gambusia
- Species: G. holbrooki

Binomial name
- Gambusia holbrooki Girard, 1859

Synonyms
- Heterandria holbrooki (Girard, 1859); Schizophallus holbrooki (Girard, 1859); Zygonectes atrilatus Jordan & Brayton, 1878

= Eastern mosquitofish =

Gambusia holbrooki

Species of fish

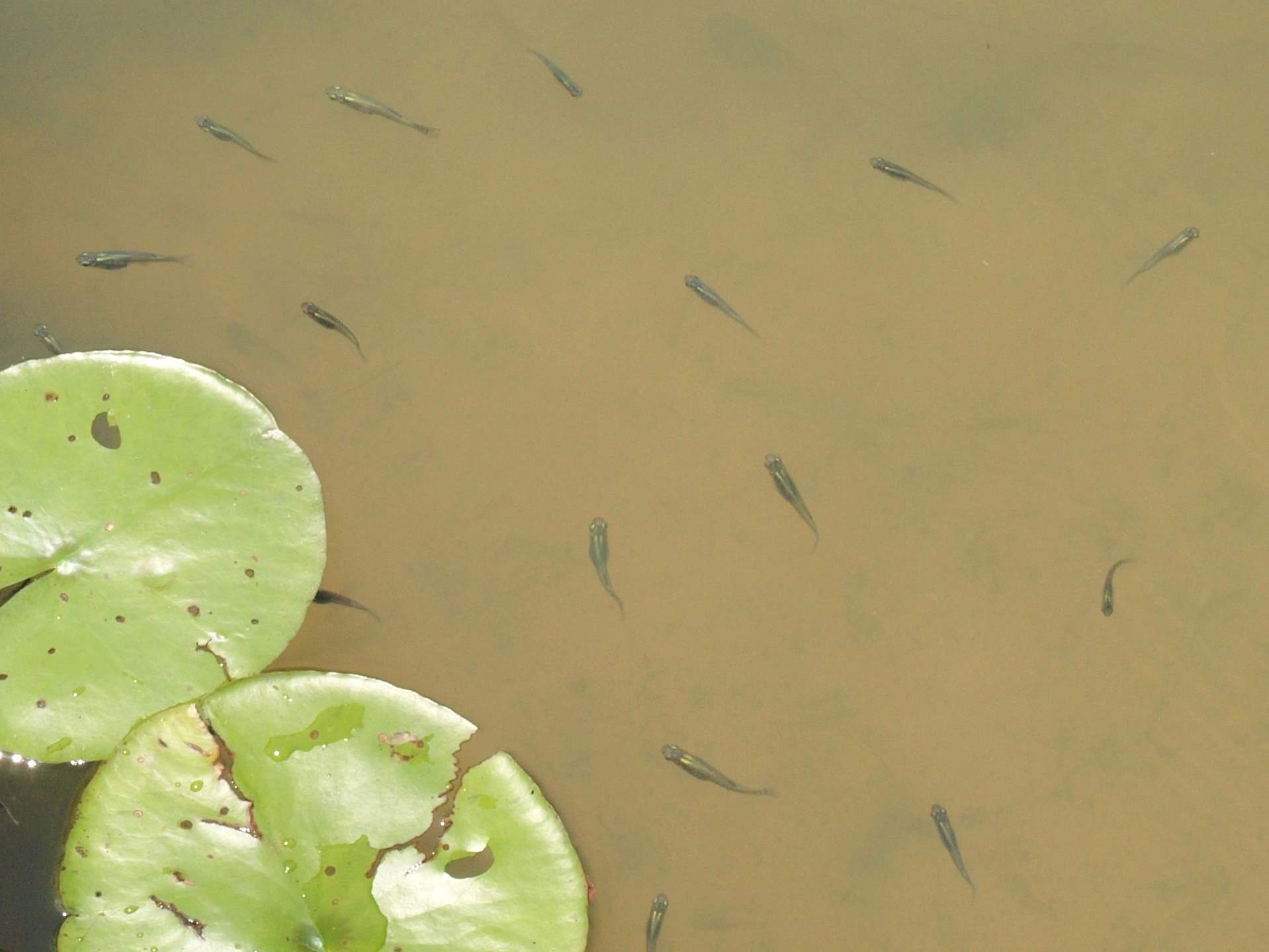
Eastern mosquitofish in a pond in the Pee Dee region of South Carolina, 2011

The eastern mosquitofish (Gambusia holbrooki) is a species of freshwater fish, closely related to the western mosquitofish, Gambusia affinis. It is a member of the family Poeciliidae of order Cyprinodontiformes. The eastern mosquitofish is native to the eastern and southern United States from Florida to New Jersey and inland to Alabama and Tennessee, while the western mosquitofish has a larger distribution throughout the United States.

== Description ==
The eastern mosquitofish is a small, light-colored fish with semitransparent fins. The females usually have a black stripe near their eye area and light spots can be seen on the caudal and dorsal fins of both sexes. Due to its similar size, shape, and reproductive habits, it can easily be mistaken for a guppy. Generally, males reach 1.5 in (3.8 cm) and females 2.5 in (6.4 cm). These fish are a livebearer species, and as such, the females are larger and more rounded than the males. Pregnant females are also easily recognizable by their gravid spot; a darker area on their bellies where they hold the fry.

Mosquitofish may have a melanistic color pattern with black spots, resembling a dalmatian. This could result in its being misidentified as another species.

=== Similar species ===
In its native range, eastern mosquitofish may be confused with the western mosquitofish (Gambusia affinis) or the sailfin molly (Poecilia latipinna). It can be distinguished from G. affinis on the basis of its hooked third ray on the male gonopodium. On average, G. holbrooki has one or two additional dorsal fin rays compared to G. affinis, but this characteristic varies both by sex and by individual in these species.

In eastern Australia, the female and juvenile local Pacific blue-eye (Pseudomugil signifer) are similar in appearance but have a forked tail fin.

== Taxonomy and naming ==
French naturalist Charles Frédéric Girard described the species in 1859. The genus Gambusia comes from the Cuban term, gambusino, which means "free-lance miner" or may be related to Spanish gamusino, an imaginary animal used in a practical joke similar to the snipe hunt. Common names include eastern mosquitofish, plague minnow and eastern gambusia. The identity of the person honored in the specific name is uncertain but is thought to be the physician and naturalist John Edwards Holbrook (1796–1871).

== Diet ==
G. holbrooki is considered a planktivorous species which consumes algae and detritus. Feeding habits seem to change based on maturity and mating season. Gambusia holbrooki will, if need arises, switch food sources to survive. With an increase of competition, this species will switch from a diet rich in phytoplankton, algae, and detritus to one consisting of zooplankton, invertebrates, the larvae of many other fish and amphibian species, and plant-associated animals. The main source of competition for G. holbrooki seems to be an increase of its own species and other planktivorous species. The main problem with this is, as mentioned before, it will change its diet; this is common even among the juveniles and both sexes of its own species. The females tend to not specialize on one prey, and consume all evenly, whereas the males and juveniles specialize on one prey type. However. males, females, and juveniles all consume detritus at the same rate.

== Habitat and distribution ==
Eastern mosquitofish are native to the southeastern United States. They have been introduced worldwide and have become an invasive species in many places including Australia and Europe.

Eastern mosquitofish are found in shallow, standing to slow-flowing water, mostly in vegetated ponds, lakes, and sloughs. This species thrives in water between 31 °C (88 °F) and 35 °C (95 °F), and seems to be able to acclimate to temperatures above and below this. G. holbrooki has been shown to survive in water with pH and chemical levels known to kill other fish species, and prefers to live in areas where the water flows at a slow pace, is clear and without free-floating plant life, and seeks shelter in rooted plants. No decrease in this species due to human activities has been noted. The Eastern mosquitofish is easily maintained and has never been considered an endangered or threatened species due to its ability to thrive in its native habitat. Due to releases in new areas, G. holbrooki has actually increased its range. It tolerates chemical and thermal changes quite easily.

=== Prediction of future distribution ===
Through species distribution models, it has been revealed that Eastern mosquitofish exhibit significant niche expansions beyond their natural climatic ranges, with a notable shift towards tropical regions in Asia and a distinct niche shift observed in European G. holbrooki populations. These findings highlight the ecological flexibility of these species, contributing to their extensive success and posing a substantial risk for further range expansion. Furthermore, climate change is projected to create vast opportunities for additional expansion, particularly in Europe.

== Life history ==
=== Reproduction ===
Temperature has been shown to change the length of time it takes them to reach reproductive maturity and body size. This species is also known to give birth to live young instead of laying a clutch of eggs. The breeding season is between midspring and midautumn, with the peak breeding time being around summer. Females can have up to nine broods per mating season, with the average size ranging from five to 100. The variability of the average brood size is due to many variables, including temperature, age, and available nutrients. Higher temperatures have been shown to increase the fecundity of this species. The gestation period for this species is between 22 and 25 days. Predation stress is also known to affect their reproduction (clutch size). Predator-exposed females were found to give birth to higher number of stillborn offspring compared to unexposed females.

==== Sexual aggression ====
According to Pilastro et al. male mosquito fish can be especially sexually aggressive. This aggression can reduce female foraging efficiency by more than half. Females frequently form shoals to reduce sexual harassment from males.

=== Growth ===
The offspring juvenile stage lasts between 18 days and eight weeks. Once again, changes in temperature affects these numbers; colder temperatures decrease and higher temperatures can increase maturity. This species can have several generations within their breeding period because of their fast rate of growth. The usual lifespan is between one and two years, as determined by stress factors in their habitats. Sexual selection in this species is based on the size of the male. Females tend to choose larger, more aggressive males. Females tend to choose areas of shallow water with dark soil cover for brooding sites, while juveniles prefer more rooted plants in which to hide. The main human-induced change that affects the growth rate and life history of G. holbrooki is the water temperature.

== Ecology ==
=== Invasive species ===
Eastern mosquitofish have become invasive species in many freshwater systems of the world and are for example described as invasive species in Australia. Eastern mosquitofish were introduced into New South Wales in the 1920s to control mosquitoes, but provided no further benefit over small Australian native fish. Further, they cause harm to native fauna that have an aquatic larval stage. Mosquitofish are aggressive, fin-nipping harassers of other fish, and pose a serious threat to native Australian fish and aquatic invertebrates. Negative impacts on rainbowfish and galaxiid species (especially the endangered dwarf galaxias) and at least one frog species have been documented. Several rainbowfish populations appear to have become extinct due to the impacts of introduced Gambusia. Compounding the issue, Eastern mosquitofish have the ability to thrive in many different environmental conditions which are usually lethal to other fish species.

Australia set up conservation management plans to try to save native species from G. holbrooki. One such management plan included releasing a chemical known to kill mosquito larvae. The chemicals used were found to have a strong effect on the G. holbrooki, but they became tolerant to most of them fairly rapidly unless amounts considered unsafe for native species were used. Another strategy tried, and failed, to decrease this invasive species was electrocuting a lake known to have been invaded. The cost and loss of native fish was so great, that this method was dropped. The main reason it failed was mosquitofish stay in the shallows, which receive the smallest charge from the electrification method used. Later tests also revealed this species has a high tolerance for electrical shock, but the exact mechanism that allows this still seems to be questionable.

In the European Union, it is included in the list of invasive alien species of Union concern and hence cannot be imported, bred, transported, commercialized, or intentionally released into the environment in any of its member states.

=== Predators ===
Little research has been done to determine all G. holbrooki predators, due to its own predatory nature in the areas where it has been introduced. In the introduced areas, it has been known to cause top-down trophic effects due to its eating the larvae of some top predators, which include frogs and other fish. Visual exposure to its predator, largemouth bass (Micropterus salmoides) is known to affect its reproduction.
