= Thick-lipped catfish =

Conservation status
- Least Concern (IUCN 3.1)

Scientific classification
- Kingdom: Animalia
- Phylum: Chordata
- Class: Actinopterygii
- Order: Siluriformes
- Family: Ariidae
- Genus: Pachyula
- Species: P. crassilabris

Binomial name
- Pachyula crassilabris (Ramsay & Ogilby, 1886)

Synonyms
- Hemipimelodus crassilabris Ramsay & Ogilby, 1886; Arius crassilabris (Ramsay & Ogilby, 1886); Cinetodus crassilabris (Ramsay & Ogilby, 1886)

Species of fish

The thick-lipped catfish (Pachyula crassilabris) is a species of catfish in the family Ariidae. It was described by Edward Pierson Ramsay and James Douglas Ogilby in 1886, originally under the genus Hemipimelodus. It is found in freshwater rivers in New Guinea. It reaches a standard length of 50 cm (20 in). Its diet consists of insects and vascular plants.
