= Cochlefelis danielsi =

Scientific classification
- Domain: Eukaryota
- Kingdom: Animalia
- Phylum: Chordata
- Class: Actinopterygii
- Order: Siluriformes
- Family: Ariidae
- Genus: Cochlefelis
- Species: C. danielsi

Binomial name
- Cochlefelis danielsi (Regan, 1908)

Synonyms
- Arius danielsi Regan, 1908

Species of fish

Cochlefelis danielsi, or Daniel's catfish, is a species of catfish in the family Ariidae. It was described by Charles Tate Regan in 1908, originally under the genus Arius. It is found in brackish and freshwaters including rivers, lagoons and mangroves, in New Guinea. It reaches a standard length of 45 cm (18 in). It feeds on shrimp and prawns of the genera Caridina and Macrobrachium.
