= Hard-palate catfish =

Scientific classification
- Domain: Eukaryota
- Kingdom: Animalia
- Phylum: Chordata
- Class: Actinopterygii
- Order: Siluriformes
- Family: Ariidae
- Genus: Brustiarius
- Species: B. solidus

Binomial name
- Brustiarius solidus (Herre, 1935)

Synonyms
- Arius solidus Herre, 1935; Arius kanganamanensis Herre, 1935; Hemipimelodus bernhardi Nichols, 1940; Arius microstomus Nichols, 1940

Species of fish

The hard-palate catfish (Brustiarius solidus), also known as the hard-plate catfish, is a species of sea catfish in the family Ariidae. It was described by Albert William Herre in 1935, originally under the genus Arius. It is a tropical freshwater fish which is found in Indonesia and Papua New Guinea. It reaches a maximum standard length of 60 cm (24 in), with both sexes more commonly reaching an SL of 35 cm (14 in). It reaches a maximum weight of 1.8 kg (4.0 lb).

The hard-palate catfish feeds on shrimp in the genus Macrobrachium, algae in the genus Salvinia, insects and nymphs, Ophieleotris aporos, leeches, earthworms, and detritus. Adults spawn year-round, laying eggs in quantities ranging from 8-85, which are incubated orally.
