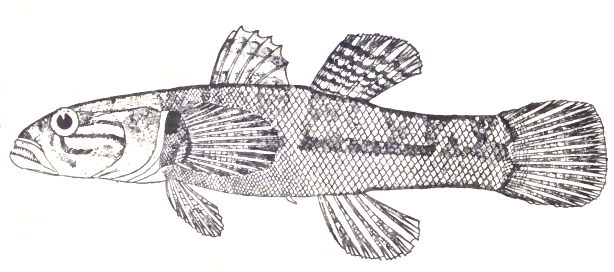

Conservation status
- Least Concern (IUCN 3.1)

Scientific classification
- Kingdom: Animalia
- Phylum: Chordata
- Class: Actinopterygii
- Division: Teleostei
- Order: Gobiiformes
- Family: Eleotridae
- Genus: Belobranchus
- Species: B. belobranchus

Binomial name
- Belobranchus belobranchus (Valenciennes, 1837)

Synonyms
- Eleotris belobrancha Valenciennes, 1837; Belobranchus taeniopterus Bleeker, 1856; Belobranchus quoyi Bleeker, 1856

= Belobranchus belobranchus =

Species of fish

Belobranchus belobranchus, the throat-spine gudgeon, is a species of fresh and brackish water ray-finned fish belonging to the family Eleotridae, the spinycheek sleepers or bullies. This species is found in eastern Asia and Melanesia.

== Taxonomy ==
Belobranchus belobranchus was first formally described as Eleotris belobrancha in 1837 by the French zoologist Achille Valenciennes in volume 12 of the Histoire naturelle des poissons with its type locality given as Manado Island, Sulawesi, Indonesia. This species is currently classified in the genus Belobranchus which was described in 1856 by Pieter Bleeker with Belobranchus quoyi as its type species, and another species described by him B. taeniopterus was included. Both B. quoyi and B. taeniopterus are now considered to be a junior synonyms of E. belobrancha, with B. quoyi being an unneeded replacement name for E. belobrancha. The genus Belobranchus is classified in the family Eleotridae which is classified within the suborder Gobioidei, the gobies, of the order Gobiiformes, which also includes the cardinalfishes and sand divers.

== Etymology ==
Belobranchus belobranchus is the type species of the genus Belobranchus, a name that is a tautonym for E. belobrancha. the specific name, belobranchus combines belos, meaning "arrow", with branchia, meaning "gills", and allusion to the branchiostegal rays, which merge into a spine anteriorly.

== Description ==
Belobranchus belobranchus has a fusform body and it reaches a maximum total length of 19.5 cm (7.7 in). The dorsal fins have a total of 7 spines and 7 soft rays and the anal fin has 1 spone and 7 soft rays. There are slender dark longitudinal lines on the flanks, one per scale row, there are pale brown bands that alternate with a dark brown stripes along the middle of the flank. The caudal fin is spotted, the spots are arranged in alternating white and brown bands.

== Distribution and habitat ==
Belobranchus belobranchus has been recorded from Japan, Philippines, Indonesia, Timor-Leste, Papua New Guinea, Solomon Islands, Vanuatu and Fiji. It is an amphidromous fish that is found in coastal streams over beds of sand, gravel or rock, as well as in estuaries.
