= Walter Ivantsoff =

Australian ichthyologist

- Born: 20th-century
- Known for: Systematics of Old World silversides and rainbowfishes
- Scientific career
- Fields: Ichthyology
- Institutions: Macquarie University

Walter Ivantsoff is an Australian ichthyologist known for his research on the systematics of Old World silversides and rainbowfishes.

== Career ==
Ivantsoff was employed at Macquarie University in Sydney from 1968 until his retirement in 2000. Following his retirement, he continued his association with the university as a Senior Research Fellow.

During the 1970s, Ivantsoff completed his doctoral research under the supervision of the director of the Australian Museum. He participated in multiple Australian Museum expeditions, during which he collected fish specimens from a wide range of regions across Australia.

== Research ==
Ivantsoff’s scientific work has focused primarily on Old World silversides (family Atherinidae) and their systematics, with particular emphasis on blue-eyes (family Pseudomugilidae), the genera Craterocephalus and Iso, Sulawesi rainbowfishes (family Telmatherinidae), and rainbowfishes sensu stricto (family Melanotaeniidae). He has described multiple fish species, often in collaboration with ichthyologists Gerald R. Allen and L. E. L. M. Crowley.

== Legacy ==
In recognition of his contributions to ichthyology, the blue-eye fish species Pseudomugil ivantsoffi was named in his honour.
