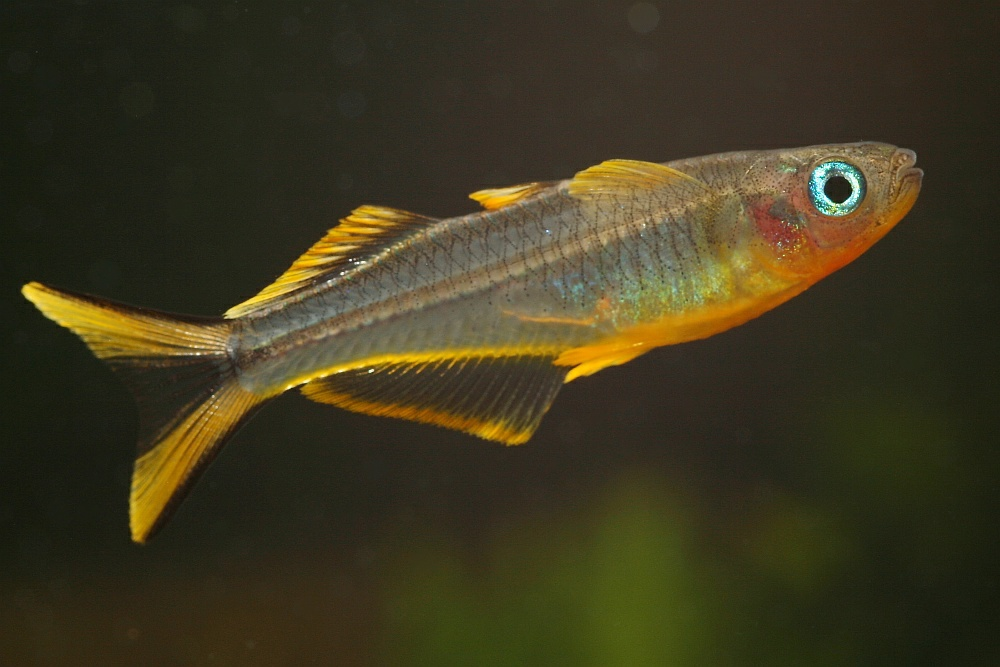
- Forktail blue-eye (Pseudomugil furcatus)

Scientific classification
- Kingdom: Animalia
- Phylum: Chordata
- Class: Actinopterygii
- Order: Atheriniformes
- Suborder: Atherinoidei
- Family: Pseudomugilidae; Kner, 1865

Genera
- see text

= Pseudomugilidae =

Blue-eyes

Subfamily of fishes

The Pseudomugilidae, the blue-eyes, are a family of atheriniform fish. They have variously been treated as either a family of their own or as a subfamily of the Melanotaeniidae. They inhabit fresh and brackish water in Australia, New Guinea and nearby smaller islands. Blue-eyes are small fish, typically no more than 5 cm (2.0 in) in length. Like the larger melanotaeniid rainbowfish, they spawn all year round, and attach their eggs to vegetation.

== Genera ==
There are three general in the Pseudomugilinae:

- Kiunga G. R. Allen, 1983
- Pseudomugil Kner, 1866
- Scaturiginichthys Ivantsoff, Unmack, Saeed & Crowley, 1991
