= Cooper Creek catfish =

Conservation status
- Endangered (IUCN 3.1)

Scientific classification
- Kingdom: Animalia
- Phylum: Chordata
- Class: Actinopterygii
- Order: Siluriformes
- Family: Plotosidae
- Genus: Neosiluroides; Allen & Feinberg, 1998
- Species: N. cooperensis

Binomial name
- Neosiluroides cooperensis Allen & Feinberg, 1998

Species of fish

The Cooper Creek catfish (Neosiluroides cooperensis), also known as the Cooper Creek tandan, is a species of catfish (order Siluriformes) of the family Plotosidae, and is the only species of the genus Neosiluroides. The species’ scientific name Neosiluroides came from the genus Neosilurus to which the Cooper Creek Catfish bears some resemblance. The second part of its name, cooperensis, is a reference to the sole location of the species in the Cooper Creek Catchment. It is an eel-tailed freshwater fish that resides in the Cooper Creek system of the Lake Eyre drainage in southern Queensland, Australia. This species grows up to about 46 centimetres (18 in) SL.

It is usually found in larger, more permanent waterholes with an earth and clay substrate, where significant flow occurs only after severe rainfall events; at this time, water is typically very turbid. It is very aggressive towards other fishes, particularly in captivity. These fish feed on gastropods and crustaceans. This species has the largest egg size (3–4 millimetres or 0.12–0.16 inches and the lowest fecundity (about 1000 eggs per spawning) per unit length of any plotosid catfish in Australia.

It is currently listed as an endangered species.

== Physical Characteristics ==
The Cooper Creek Catfish has a long, slender body which tapers towards a plotosid tail. Its body is laterally compressed whilst its robust head is relatively dorsoventrally flattened. When removed from the water, this species colours range from a tan or light brown to a creamy grey colour, with a creamy, whitish coloured underbelly. The species’ back and sides also typically have a pattern of lighter and darker mottling or speckles, as well as yellow fins. When viewed from the side, the Cooper Creek Catfish has a rounded snout, subterminal mouth, and fleshy lips. It has several rows of slender teeth on both upper and lower jaws, as well as a patch of molariform teeth covering most of the palate. It has four pairs of nasal barbels (whisker-like protrusions) and a tubular anterior nostril, located on its upper lip. It also has a unique posterior nostril, which is sheathed in a thick layer of skin, that differentiates the Cooper Creek Catfish from other Australian Catfish species. The additional layer of flesh helps form an extra outer chamber.

Another differentiating characteristic of the Cooper Creek Catfish is that instead of scales, its pale grey to creamy brown skin is covered in a dense layer of minuscule papillae. The species also has a relatively short, pointed dorsal fin, which starts in front of the ventral fin by approximately one Cooper Creek Catfish head width. Whereas the pectoral fins originate from just posterior to the opercular margin and have ends that are pointed with a slightly rounded tip. The anterior edges of both dorsal and pectoral fins are also slightly serrated. The Cooper Creek Catfish can grow to a total size (from tip of snout to end of caudal fin/tail) of approximately 46 to 60 cm (18 to 24 in), a size large enough to suggest it has a long lifespan.

== Geographical Location/Habitat ==
The Cooper Creek Catfish is found only in the Cooper Creek Catchment system, in the Lake Eyre Basin drainage of north-east South Australia and south-west Queensland. This species inhabits an area of approximately 128 km^{2} (50 sq mi), the vast majority of which consists of the large, permanent waterholes of seasonal channels. The Cooper Creek Catfish has been recorded to frequent three of the major river systems which help feed the Lake Eyre Basin, including the Barcoo River, Thomson River, and Cooper Creek. It has been recorded as far upstream as Blackall on the Barcoo River, and Muttaburra on the Thomson River, and almost as far downstream as Etadunna in the lower Cooper Creek region. Cooper Creek Catfish occurrences have also been recorded in some smaller, connected tributaries, including the Darr River, Wilson River, Vergemont Creek, and Coongie Lakes. During extended dry periods where there is very little to no flow, Cooper Creek dries up to form a mosaic of isolated, turbid waterholes which become the only habitats available to resident obligate aquatic species. Typically, the aquatic environment contains plenty of mud substrates and the water has very high turbidity.

During the dry season, Cooper Creek Catfish typically survive better in shallower waterholes, likely due to the vast amount of benthic algae sustained by the shallow water and less steep slopes. Benthic algae will often form a ‘bath-tub ring’ around the edges of isolated waterholes, which helps sustain the fish population during dry periods. This is especially important for large fish such as the Cooper Creek Catfish as they typically feed on large invertebrates such as crustaceans and gastropods, which are dependent on high levels of primary production like the benthic algae. This also offers another explanation as to why the Cooper Creek Catfish has not been found on the floodplains.

== Diet ==
The Cooper Creek Catfish feeds primarily on large invertebrates such as crustaceans and gastropods. The gut contents of Cooper Creek catfish caught from the wild have consisted mostly of snails. However, captive members of this species have been observed to consume snails, shrimps, earthworms, fish pellets, and fish flesh. The Cooper Creek catfish has also been noted for being very aggressive and has been known to eat the eyes or scales of other aquarium residents.

== Reproduction ==
A large number of fish residing in the Cooper Creek Catchment have reproductive cycles which are affected by the booms and busts of the local floodwaters, wherein floods (booms) act as cues for fish reproduction to begin. Eleven out of the twelve native fish species of Cooper Creek resemble eupotamonic phytophilic fish which migrate between watering holes, channels, and down the floodplains during flood conditions. Such species have flexible strategies for reproduction, and will spawn on the floodplain, its margins, and in channels. This is likely due to the floodplain habitats providing greater food resources for fish larvae, juveniles, and adults, allowing for increased growth. However, the Cooper Creek Catfish is the only native species of fish that has not yet been recorded on the floodplains. Instead, the Cooper Creek Catfish appears to share some similarities with eupotamonic pelagophilic guild fish, which are residents of the channels that do not enter floodplains. Therefore, the reproductive cycle of the Cooper Creek Catfish is seasonal, wherein eggs are released on a periodic basis, regardless of recent hydrological conditions and corresponding water levels. Since the Cooper Creek Catfish has a summer seasonal recruitment, where fish are spawned during the early months of summer, juvenile fish will appear in the populations after summer, with an increase in smaller fish during and after January. Meanwhile, larger sized fish are more common in the months between September and December, as mature fish become large enough to reproduce.

Whilst the reproductive biology of the Cooper Creek Catfish is largely unknown, male and female fish can be differentiated by their urogenital papilla. Male Cooper Creek Catfish have longer, pointed papilla, whilst female fish have short and flat papilla. The Cooper Creek Catfish is also known to have the largest sized eggs and lowest fecundity rate of any fish in central Australia, as well as any Australian freshwater plotosid. A Cooper Creek Catfish with a total length of 475 mm (18.7 in) is capable of laying only 1000, very large sized per spawning. Due to the species’ existence primarily along the bottoms of waterholes and its low fecundity, it lays eggs either along the bottoms of channels or possibly in a nest, as this is a less risky method of dispersal than on large floodplains.

== Potential Threats ==
The two main threats to the survival of the Cooper Creek Catfish species include threats from invasive species and loss of habitat due to human interferences.

=== Habitat Loss ===
Human water resource developments have caused floodplain rivers in semi-arid and arid areas to become one of the most threatened types of river systems. This is due to the interruption that water resource management causes the naturally extreme, typical ‘boom and bust’ flood dynamics. Population decrease has been observed for Cooper Creek Catfish in deeper waterholes, likely due to a decrease in gross primary production (GPP), as shallower waterholes tend to have a larger amount of benthic algae, than deeper waterholes with steeper slopes. The amount of algae will indirectly affect the populations of organisms higher up the food chain as it will determine the number of crustaceans and gastropods available as food resources to larger species such as the Cooper Creek Catfish. However, deep waterholes that managed to increase gross primary production (GPP) were able to maintain the Cooper Creek catfish population.

=== Invasive Species ===
The invasive fish species Oxyeleotris lineolata or sleepy cod has currently taken hold in the Lake Eyre Basin and Cooper Creek catchment areas. The sleepy cod is a large, piscivorous gudgeon native to coastal North Eastern Australia and the Gulf of Carpentaria. O. lineolata, also known as sleepy cod, has previously been considered to pose a serious threat to native species of fish, with past translocations of sleepy cod having resulted in the rapid takeover of the new environment and a subsequent decline in other niche species native to the habitat. Sleepy cod have a lifespan of approximately 15 years, as well as high fecundity, batch spawning and high rates of juvenile survival that help make it a serious threat to other fish species both through competition for resources and predation, as sleepy cod have been found to prey on multiple species of native fish. One native fish species in particular, Porochilus argenteus has been preyed on by sleepy cod in the past and is very similar to the Cooper Creek Catfish in both behaviour and morphology, thus suggesting the Cooper Creek Catfish would also be vulnerable to predation by the sleepy cod. (Sternberg & Coskayne, 2018).

Currently, the sleepy cod species inhabits many of the same areas as the Cooper Creek Catfish and can be found in the main channel of the Cooper Creek catchment. Sleepy cod have also been spreading further downstream into the Coongie Lakes Ramsar site, and have managed to colonise the majority of the Cooper Creek catchment area in the last decade. It has also colonised many refugial waterholes. Both the sleepy cod and the Cooper Creek Catfish exhibit strong demersal tendencies, wherein they are typically found living along the bottom of their aqueous environment, so the chance of interactions between the two species is high. Interactions between the sleepy cod and the Cooper Creek Catfish will be particularly likely during extended periods of waterhole drying, where waterholes shrink and there is an increase in competition for food and space. Dry periods would therefore be likely to be difficult times for the Cooper Creek catfish species’ survival, as the dry periods are when fluctuations in fish population and assemblage structure tend to occur. True potential has therefore been found for the sleepy cod species to dominate refugial waterholes in the Cooper Creek catchment area and cause biotic homogenisation by extinction of native species such as the Cooper Creek Catfish, through increased competition and predation. Eradication of the sleepy cod species in the Cooper Creek catchment area would be extremely difficult due to its now widespread distribution, the remote location of the habitat, and a lack of suitable resources.
