= Neosilurus novaeguineae =

Conservation status
- Least Concern (IUCN 3.1)

Scientific classification
- Kingdom: Animalia
- Phylum: Chordata
- Class: Actinopterygii
- Order: Siluriformes
- Family: Plotosidae
- Genus: Neosilurus
- Species: N. novaeguineae

Binomial name
- Neosilurus novaeguineae (Weber, 1907)

Synonyms
- Copidoglanis novaeguineae Weber, 1907; Tandanus novaeguineae (Weber 1907)

Species of fish

Neosilurus novaeguineae is a freshwater eeltail catfish described by Max Weber in 1907. It is endemic to northern New Guinea. The common name New Guinea tandan has been proposed for it.

This catfish prefers deeper pools of small streams that are often littered with logs and branches. It grows to 21 cm (8.3 in) standard length.
