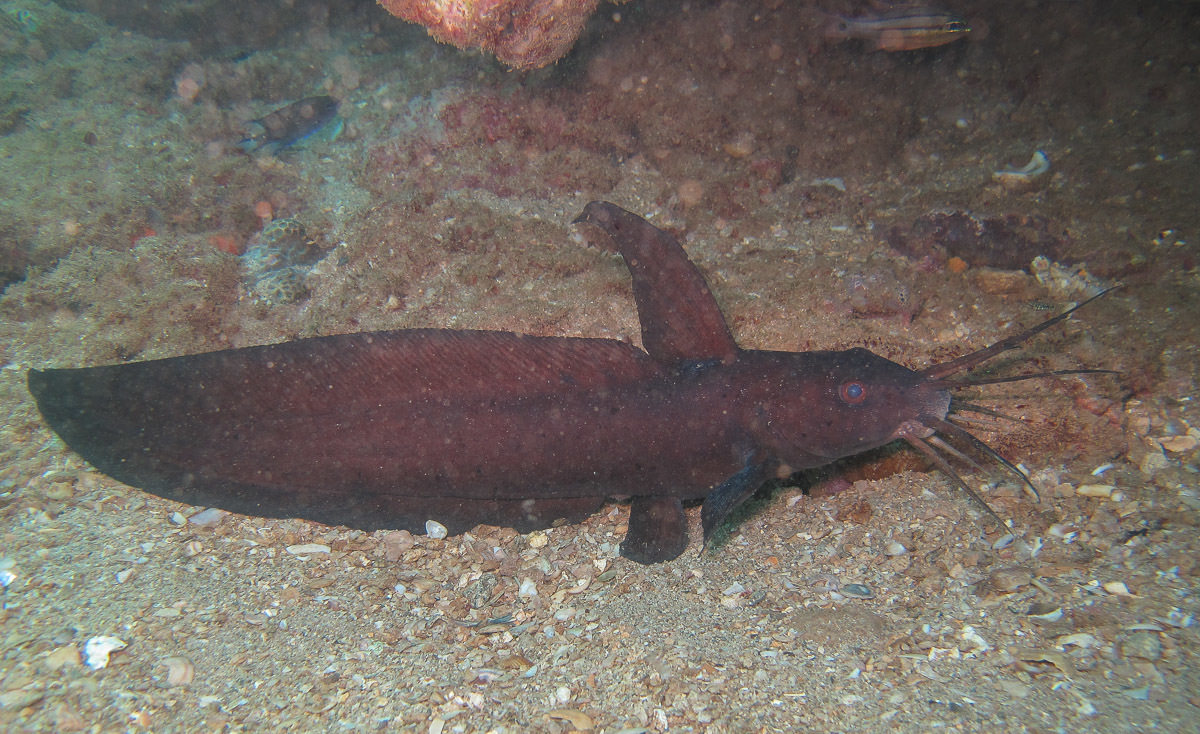

Scientific classification
- Kingdom: Animalia
- Phylum: Chordata
- Class: Actinopterygii
- Order: Siluriformes
- Family: Plotosidae
- Genus: Paraplotosus
- Species: P. butleri

Binomial name
- Paraplotosus butleri Allen, 1998

= Paraplotosus butleri =

Species of fish

Paraplotosus butleri, commonly known as the sailfin catfish, is a species of catfish in the family Plotosidae. This fish is found in coastal reefs off northern Australia and the Western Pacific (New Guinea, Island Southeast Asia, Taiwan, and the Ryukyu Islands). It grows up to about 32.5 centimetres (12.8 in) SL.

The sailfin catfish is found in shallow coastal waters to 5 metres depth. Mature adults are completely black.
