= Neosilurus gloveri =

Conservation status
- Critically Endangered (IUCN 3.1)

Scientific classification
- Kingdom: Animalia
- Phylum: Chordata
- Class: Actinopterygii
- Order: Siluriformes
- Family: Plotosidae
- Genus: Neosilurus
- Species: N. gloveri

Binomial name
- Neosilurus gloveri Allen & Feinberg 1998

Species of fish

Neosilurus gloveri, commonly known as Dalhousie catfish, is a species of catfish native to Dalhousie Springs in central Australia. It is listed as Critically Endangered under both the IUCN Red List and the Australian EPBC Act.
