= Neosilurus equinus =

Conservation status
- Least Concern (IUCN 3.1)

Scientific classification
- Kingdom: Animalia
- Phylum: Chordata
- Class: Actinopterygii
- Order: Siluriformes
- Family: Plotosidae
- Genus: Neosilurus
- Species: N. equinus

Binomial name
- Neosilurus equinus (Weber, 1913)

Synonyms
- Copidoglanis equinus Weber, 1913

Species of fish

Neosilurus equinus, the southern tandan, is a species of fish in the eeltail catfish family. It occurs in torrents in the New Guinea Highlands. It can be found in Lake Kutubu.
