= Neosilurus ater =

Scientific classification
- Domain: Eukaryota
- Kingdom: Animalia
- Phylum: Chordata
- Class: Actinopterygii
- Order: Siluriformes
- Family: Plotosidae
- Genus: Neosilurus
- Species: N. ater

Binomial name
- Neosilurus ater (Perugia, 1894)

Synonyms
- Lambertia atra Perugia, 1894; Tandanus ater (Perugis, 1894); Neosilurus mediobarbis Ogilby, 1908

Species of fish

Neosilurus ater, commonly known as black catfish, butter jew or narrowfront tandan is a species of catfish native to rivers and streams in northern Australia and New Guinea. It can reach a length of 47 cm (19 in).
