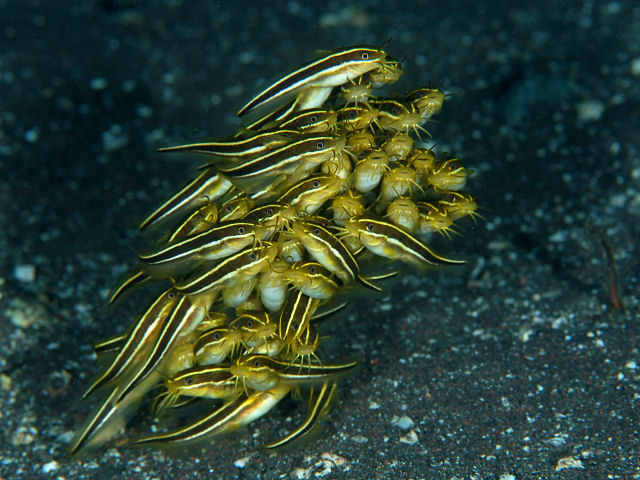

Scientific classification
- Kingdom: Animalia
- Phylum: Chordata
- Class: Actinopterygii
- Order: Siluriformes
- Family: Plotosidae
- Genus: Plotosus
- Species: P. japonicus

Binomial name
- Plotosus japonicus Yoshino & Kishimoto, 2008

= Plotosus japonicus =

Species of fish

Plotosus japonicus, commonly known as the Japanese striped eel catfish, is a species of eeltail catfish belonging to the family Plotosidae. P. japonicus is native to Indo-Pacific, including the Japanese archipelago and the Red Sea.

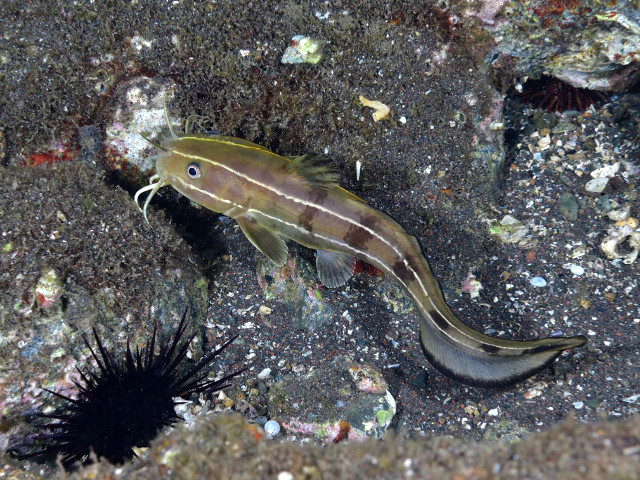
At night, with horizontal stripes as well as the usual vertical stripes

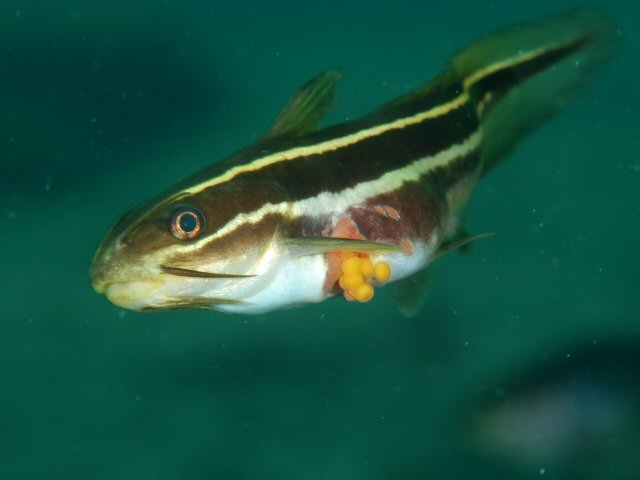
Ruptured stomach with eggs protruding

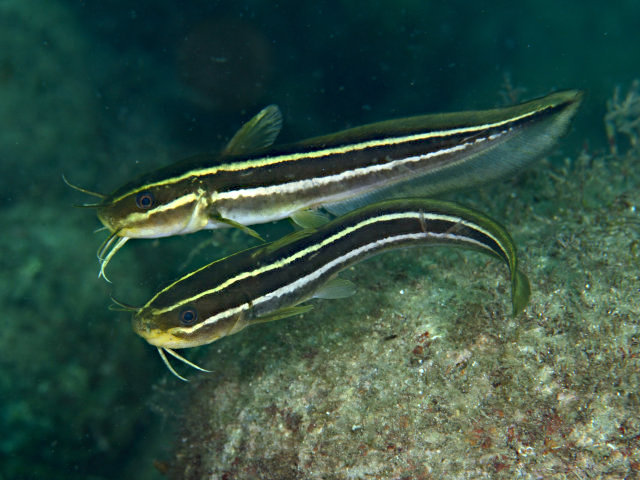
Pair
