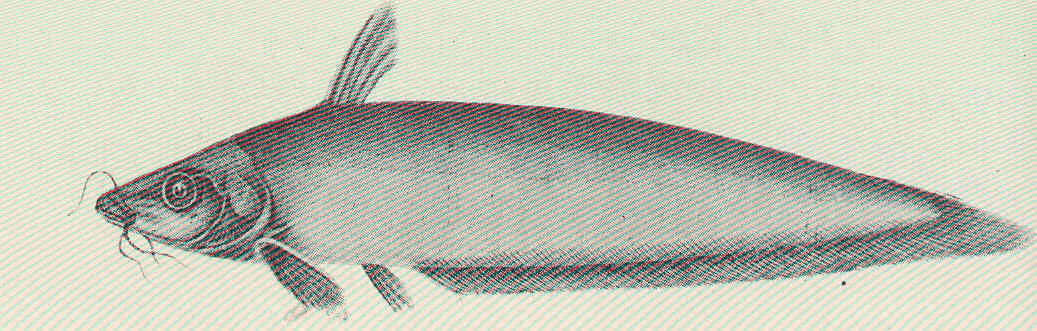

Conservation status
- Least Concern (IUCN 3.1)

Scientific classification
- Kingdom: Animalia
- Phylum: Chordata
- Class: Actinopterygii
- Order: Siluriformes
- Family: Plotosidae
- Genus: Neosilurus
- Species: N. hyrtlii

Binomial name
- Neosilurus hyrtlii Steindachner, 1867

Synonyms
- Silurichthys australis, Castelnau, 1875; Neosilurus australis, Castelnau, 1878; Eumeda elongata, Castelnau, 1878; Neosilurus robustus, Ogilby, 1908

= Neosilurus hyrtlii =

Species of fish

Neosilurus hyrtlii, commonly known as Hyrtl's catfish or Glencoe tandan, is a species of catfish found across northern Australia, from the Pilbara to southeastern Queensland.

== Taxonomy ==
Neosilurus hyrtlii has been given many common names, including common eel-tail catfish, Glencoe tandan, Hyrtl's tandan, inland catfish, moonfish, moony, Morton's tandan, mottled tandan, salmon catfish, silver moonfish, straight-backed catfish, white tandan, yellow fin tandan and yellow-finned catfish.

Austrian naturalist Franz Steindachner described the species in 1867, from the Fitzroy River in Queensland.

== Description ==
This catfish is generally between 10 and 20 cm (4 and 8 in) in length, though larger fish to 30 cm long are not uncommon. Fish of up to 40 cm (15.5 in) have been recorded from the Alligator River. Female fish are a little larger than male fish.

The head is wide and mildly flattened with four pairs of barbels. It has a sturdy dorsal spine, the inside edge of which is serrated. Large fish are dark brown or grey above fading to whitish below with dark brown to black (or rarely yellow) fins. The male and female have silver flanks and yellow fins during spawning.

== Distribution and habitat ==
Neosilurus hyrtlii is found across northern Australia, from the Ashburton River in the Pilbara in Western Australia, through the Kimberley, where it is found in most rivers, and across the Northern Territory and into the river systems that drain into the Gulf of Carpentaria in Queensland. In inland Australia, it has been recorded from the Diamantina, Georgina, Cooper, Bulloo and Finke Rivers. It is abundant in rivers on the western side of Cape York, though less common on the east coast. It is found down the east coast as far as the Mary River in southeastern Queensland, as well as Fraser Island.

During the day, it keeps close to the river floor, generally at depths of around 2 m (6.6 ft), and forages in shallow water to 30 cm deep at night.

It has been found in water as warm as 38 °C (100 °F) at Cooper Creek.

== Feeding ==
Like most catfish, N. hyrtlii is mainly benthic, that is, feeding on or in the river floor. Its prey is small considering its size, comprising small molluscs (both bivalves and gastropods), crustaceans, detritus, mayfly nymphs and caddisfly larvae and midge larvae.

== Ecology ==
Natural predators of N. hyrtlii include the barramundi, fork-tailed catfish and tarpon.
