= Neosilurus brevidorsalis =

Conservation status
- Least Concern (IUCN 3.1)

Scientific classification
- Kingdom: Animalia
- Phylum: Chordata
- Class: Actinopterygii
- Order: Siluriformes
- Family: Plotosidae
- Genus: Neosilurus
- Species: N. brevidorsalis

Binomial name
- Neosilurus brevidorsalis (Günther 1867)

Synonyms
- Copidoglanis brevidorsalis Günther, 1867; Tandanus brevidorsalis (Günther, 1867); Anyperistius perugiae Ogilby, 1908; Neosilurus bartoni Regan, 1908

Species of fish

Neosilurus brevidorsalis, commonly known as shortfin tandan or shortfin catfish, is a species of catfish native to lakes, swamps and rivers in Far North Queensland and New Guinea. It reaches a length of 20 cm (8 in).
