= Donnelly River =

Donnelly River may refer to:

- Donnelly River, Western Australia, a town in Western Australia
- Donnelly River (Western Australia), a river in Western Australia
- Donnely River (Northwest Territories), a tributary of the Mackenzie River
