= Kutubu tandan =

Conservation status
- Endangered (IUCN 3.1)

Scientific classification
- Kingdom: Animalia
- Phylum: Chordata
- Class: Actinopterygii
- Order: Siluriformes
- Family: Plotosidae
- Genus: Oloplotosus
- Species: O. torobo

Binomial name
- Oloplotosus torobo Allen, 1985

Species of fish

The Kutubu tandan (Oloplotosus torobo) is a species of fish in the family Plotosidae. It is endemic to Lake Kutubu in the Kikori River system, Papua New Guinea.
