= Tandanus tropicanus =

Wet Tropics Tandan

Conservation status
- Least Concern (IUCN 3.1)

Scientific classification
- Kingdom: Animalia
- Phylum: Chordata
- Class: Actinopterygii
- Division: Teleostei
- Order: Siluriformes
- Family: Plotosidae
- Genus: Tandanus
- Species: T. tropicanus

Binomial name
- Tandanus tropicanus (Welsh, Jerry, & Burrows, 2014)

Species of fish

Tandanus tropicanus or the wet tropics tandan is a species of eeltail catfish native to Australia. It was discovered in rivers between Townsville and Cairns by a group of scientists from James Cook University. The species, which grows to length of about 20 inches (51 cm), has a cylindrical body tapering to a thin, eel-like tail. It has small eyes and a large mouth surrounded with barbels.
