= Neosilurus pseudospinosus =

Scientific classification
- Domain: Eukaryota
- Kingdom: Animalia
- Phylum: Chordata
- Class: Actinopterygii
- Order: Siluriformes
- Family: Plotosidae
- Genus: Neosilurus
- Species: N. pseudospinosus

Binomial name
- Neosilurus pseudospinosus Allen & Feinberg 1998

Species of fish

Neosilurus pseudospinosus, commonly known as falsespine catfish, is a species of catfish native to northwestern Australia.
