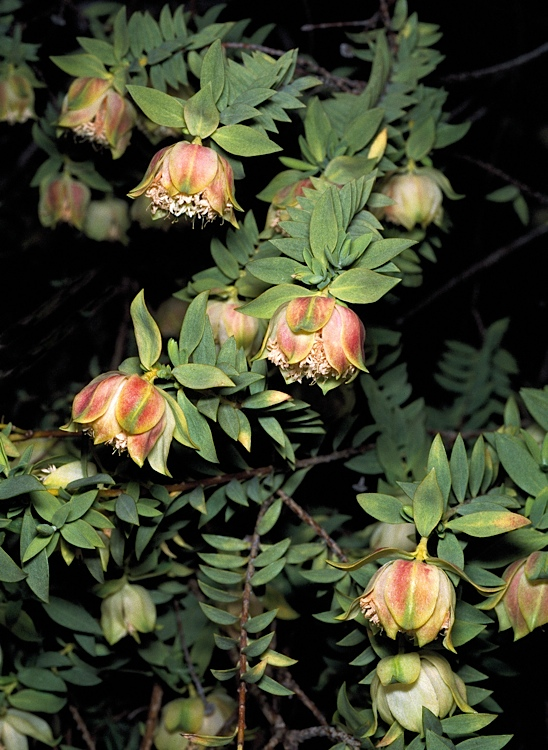

Scientific classification
- Kingdom: Plantae
- Clade: Tracheophytes
- Clade: Angiosperms
- Clade: Eudicots
- Clade: Rosids
- Order: Malvales
- Family: Thymelaeaceae
- Genus: Pimelea
- Species: P. cracens

Binomial name
- Pimelea cracens Rye

= Pimelea cracens =

Species of flowering plant

Pimelea cracens is a species of flowering plant in the family Thymelaeaceae and is endemic to the southwest of Western Australia. It is an erect, spindly shrub with narrowly elliptic to egg-shaped leaves and creamy green to pale yellow flowers surrounded by 6 or 8 yellowish or pale green and reddish involucral bracts.

== Description ==
Pimelea cracens is an erect, spindly shrub that typically grows to a height of 0.4–1.5 m (1 ft 4 in – 4 ft 11 in) and is usually single-stemmed at ground level. The leaves are arranged in opposite pairs, narrowly elliptic to more or less egg-shaped, 6–22 mm (0.24–0.87 in) long and 2–6 mm (0.079–0.236 in) wide on a petiole 0.3–1.3 mm (0.012–0.051 in) long. The flowers are pendulous and creamy green to pale yellow, surrounded by 3 or 4 pairs of yellowish or pale green and reddish involucral bracts 12–28 mm (0.47–1.10 in) long and 6–14 mm (0.24–0.55 in) wide, on a peduncle 1–4 mm (0.039–0.157 in) long. Each flower is on a pedicel about 1 mm (0.039 in) long, the flower tube 7.5–12 mm (0.30–0.47 in) long. The style extends beyond the flower tube by 4–6 mm (0.16–0.24 in). Flowering mainly occurs from July to November.

== Taxonomy ==
Pimelea ciliata was first formally described in 1988 by Barbara Lynette Rye and the description was published in the journal Nuytsia. The specific epithet (cracens) means "graceful" or "slender".

In the same edition of Nuytsia, Rye described two subspecies of P. cracens, and the names are accepted by the Australian Plant Census:

- Pimelea cracens Rye subsp. cracens has a hairy flower tube;
- Pimelea cracens Rye subsp. glabra Rye has a more or less glabrous flower tube.

== Distribution and habitat ==
This pimelea grows on undulating plains, winter wet areas and roadsides between the Donnelly River, Israelite Bay and Kumarl in the Esperance Plains, Jarrah Forest and Mallee bioregions of south-western Western Australia.
