= Freshwater cobbler =

Conservation status
- Near Threatened (IUCN 3.1)

Scientific classification
- Kingdom: Animalia
- Phylum: Chordata
- Class: Actinopterygii
- Division: Teleostei
- Order: Siluriformes
- Family: Plotosidae
- Genus: Tandanus
- Species: T. bostocki

Binomial name
- Tandanus bostocki Whitley, 1944

Synonyms
- Plotosus unicolor Castelnau, 1873

Species of fish

The freshwater cobbler (Tandanus bostocki) is a species of catfish (order Siluriformes) of the family Plotosidae. The freshwater cobbler originates from coastal drainages of southwestern Australia, from the Frankland River to the Moore River. The species may reach about 50 centimetres (20 in) total length.

The species has a dark brown to golden brown coloration which is lighter on the belly. It usually exhibits a mottled or spotted pattern. The species lives in slow-flowing streams, ponds and reservoirs. It also occurs in isolated pools in riverbeds and some freshwater lakes, swimming close to rocky, gravelly, or sandy bottoms. Underwater cavities in river banks and root mounds of sedge tussocks may be utilized for shelter. The species is tolerant of brackish conditions and has a venomous spine. It is a nest builder with a reproductive biology similar to that of the eel-tailed catfish.
