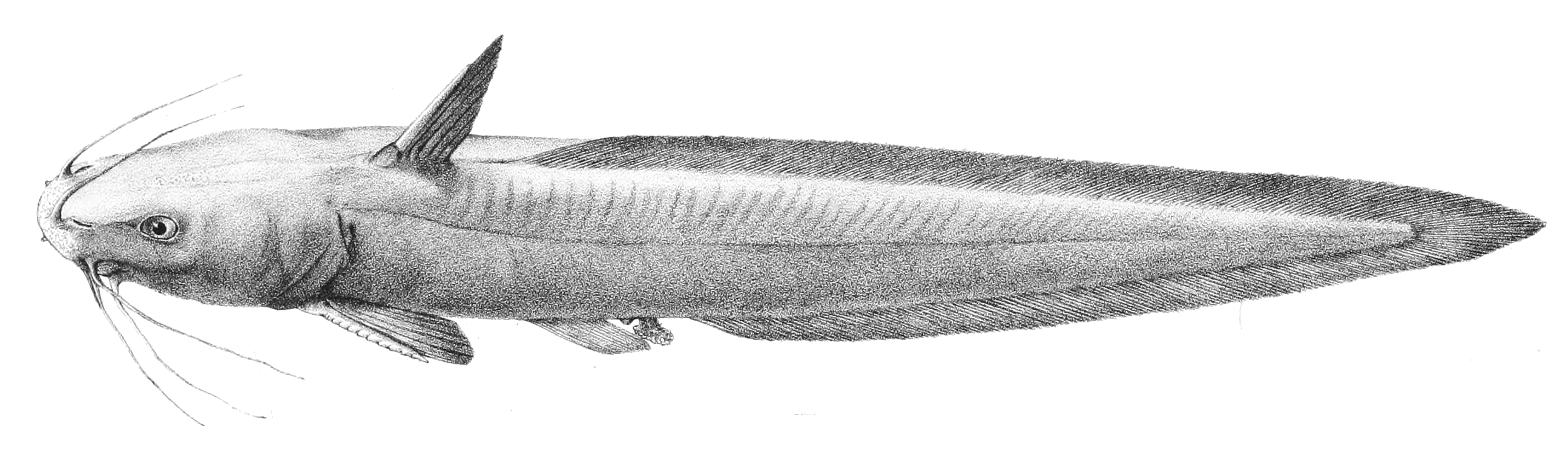

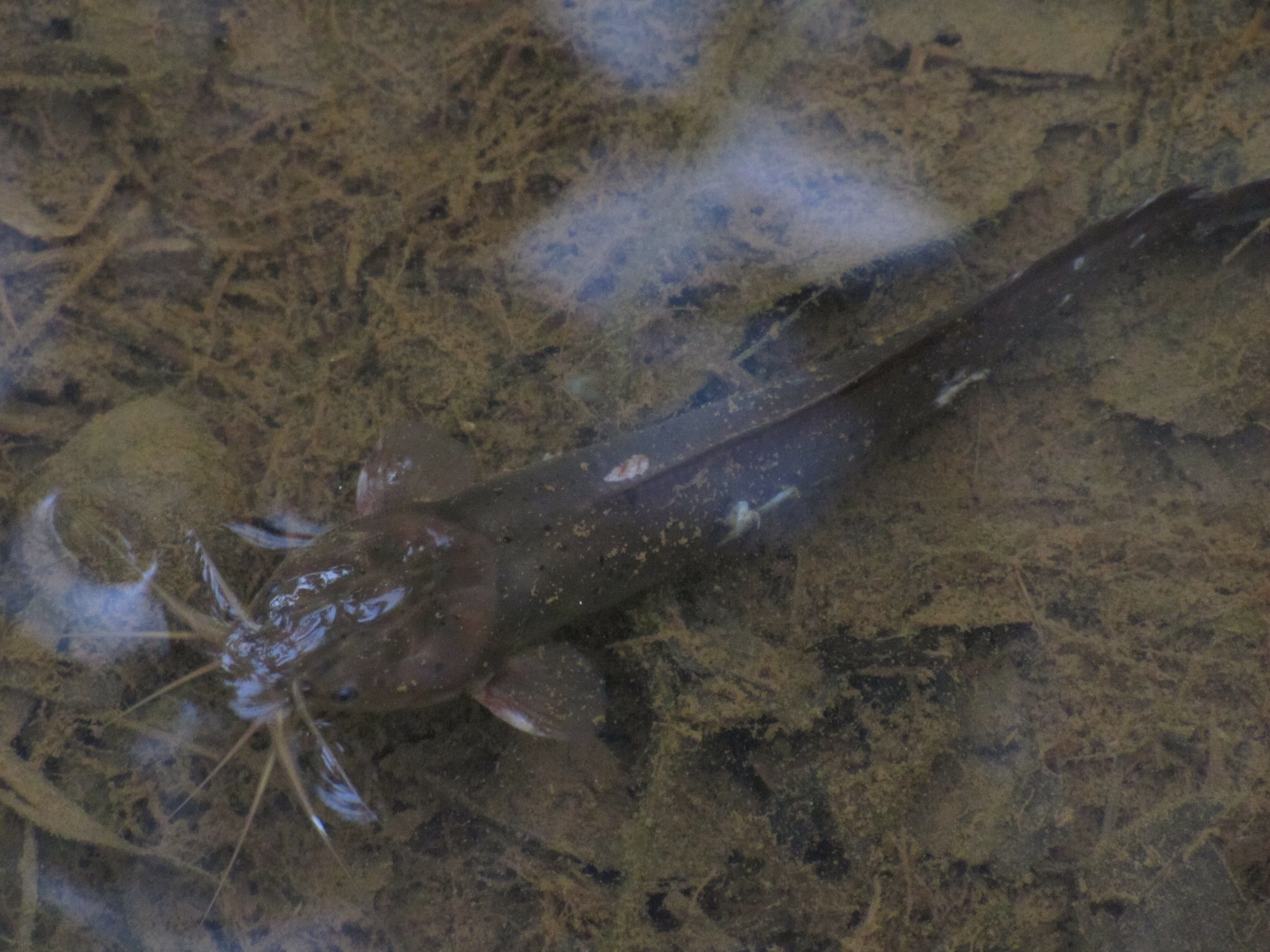

Conservation status
- Least Concern (IUCN 3.1)

Scientific classification
- Kingdom: Animalia
- Phylum: Chordata
- Class: Actinopterygii
- Order: Siluriformes
- Family: Plotosidae
- Genus: Plotosus
- Species: P. canius

Binomial name
- Plotosus canius (Hamilton, 1822)

= Plotosus canius =

Species of fish

Plotosus canius is a species of eeltail catfish, in the genus Plotosus, native to the Indian Ocean, the western Pacific Ocean and New Guinea.
