= Neosilurus mollespiculum =

Conservation status
- Vulnerable (IUCN 3.1)

Scientific classification
- Kingdom: Animalia
- Phylum: Chordata
- Class: Actinopterygii
- Order: Siluriformes
- Family: Plotosidae
- Genus: Neosilurus
- Species: N. mollespiculum

Binomial name
- Neosilurus mollespiculum Allen & Feinberg 1998

Species of fish

Neosilurus mollespiculum, commonly known as softspine catfish, is a species of catfish native to the Burdekin River system in Australia.
