= Oloplotosus =

Scientific classification
- Kingdom: Animalia
- Phylum: Chordata
- Class: Actinopterygii
- Order: Siluriformes
- Family: Plotosidae
- Genus: Oloplotosus; Weber, 1913

Type species
- Oloplotosus mariae Weber, 1913

Genus of fishes

Oloplotosus is a genus of eeltail catfishes endemic to the island of New Guinea.

== Species ==
There are currently three recognized species in this genus:

- Oloplotosus luteus Gomon & Roberts, 1978 (Pale yellow tandan)
- Oloplotosus mariae Weber, 1913 (Maria's tandan)
- Oloplotosus torobo Allen, 1985 (Kutubu tandan)

O. luteus originates from the upper Fly River in New Guinea, O. mariae is known from Western New Guinea, and O. torobo is known from the Soro River of Papua New Guinea. Otoplotosus species grow to about 15.0–20.0 centimetres (5.9–7.9 in) SL. O. luteus occurs mostly from moderate to fast-flowing, gravel-boulder bottom creeks in mountainous tributaries of the Ok Tedi River. O. mariae occurs in clear, rocky streams in deeper pools, usually in hilly or mountainous terrain. O. torobo is known only from the type locality; specimens were captured in 1983 from shallow water with a soft, muddy bottom and abundant aquatic vegetation. It is considered a vulnerable species.
