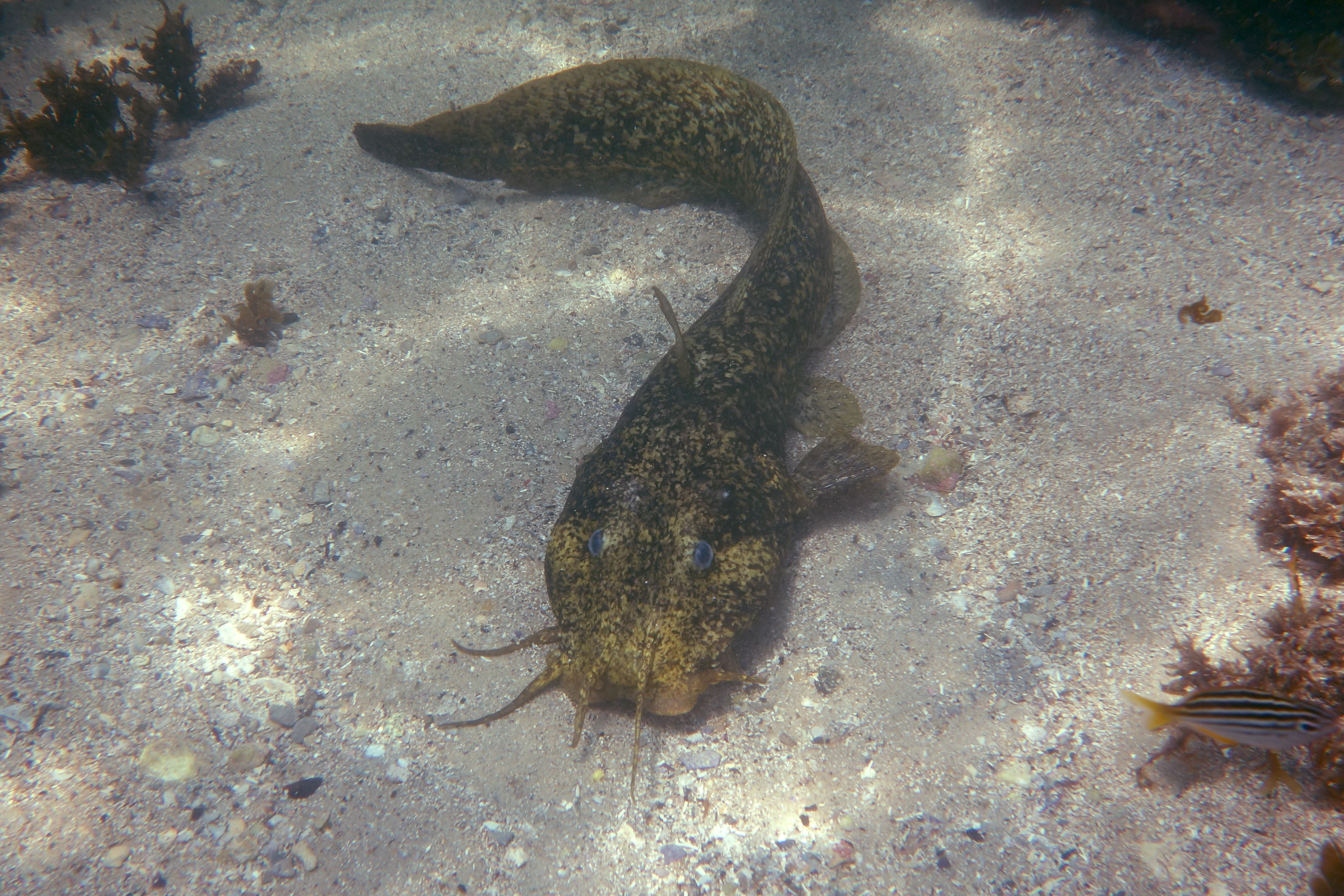

Conservation status
- Data Deficient (IUCN 3.1)

Scientific classification
- Kingdom: Animalia
- Phylum: Chordata
- Class: Actinopterygii
- Division: Teleostei
- Order: Siluriformes
- Family: Plotosidae
- Genus: Cnidoglanis; Günther, 1864
- Species: C. macrocephalus

Binomial name
- Cnidoglanis macrocephalus (Valenciennes, 1840)

Synonyms
- Plotosus macrocephalus Valenciennes, in Cuvier & Valenciennes, 1840; Plotosus megastomus Richardson, 1845; Choeroplotosus decemfilis Kner, 1867; Cnidoglanis bostockii Castelnau, 1873; Neoplotosus waterhousii Castelnau, 1875; Ostophycephalus duriceps Ogilby, 1899

= Estuary cobbler =

Species of fish

The estuary cobbler (Cnidoglanis macrocephalus) is a species of catfish (order Siluriformes) of the family Plotosidae, and is the only species of the genus Cnidoglanis. It is also commonly known as the cobbler, deteira, estuary catfish, South Australian catfish, or Swan River catfish.

== Distribution ==
The cobbler is found from Main Beach, Queensland to Jervis Bay, New South Wales, and Kingston SE, South Australia to Houtman Abrolhos Islands, Western Australia and Duck River, Tasmania, in near-shore and reef habitats.

== Description ==
Like other eeltail catfish, the cobbler resembles a catfish in front, but an eel behind. It can grow up to 91 centimetres (36 in) SL, 2,500 g (5.5 lb). They may live up to 13 years. The dorsal and pectoral fins have sharp, venomous spines that can inflict painful wounds.

== Treatment ==
Treatment of injuries by submersion of the wound in hot water is suggested though the role of heat in denaturation of toxins is debated.

However, despite this study, hot water immersion is still the recommended first aid treatment for envenomation.

== Ecology ==
The estuary cobbler is an inshore marine species which lives in shallow bays and sandy inlets near river mouths. It is found most frequently over sand, rocks, and weeds in the clear to turbid waters. By day, the estuary cobbler is most often found in holes and on ledges in banks. Estuary cobblers stay in holes and under ledges during the day, then come out at night to feed. They are opportunistic feeders, primarily feed on molluscs (bivalves and gastropods), crustaceans (prawns and amphipods), polychaete worms, algae, and organic debris. Juveniles eat more crustaceans, often from among drifting macrophytic algae, while adults feed mainly on molluscs and polychaetes. They are prey to birds such as cormorants and pelicans.
