= Donnelly River (Western Australia) =

River in Western Australia

Coordinates: 34°29′S 115°40′E

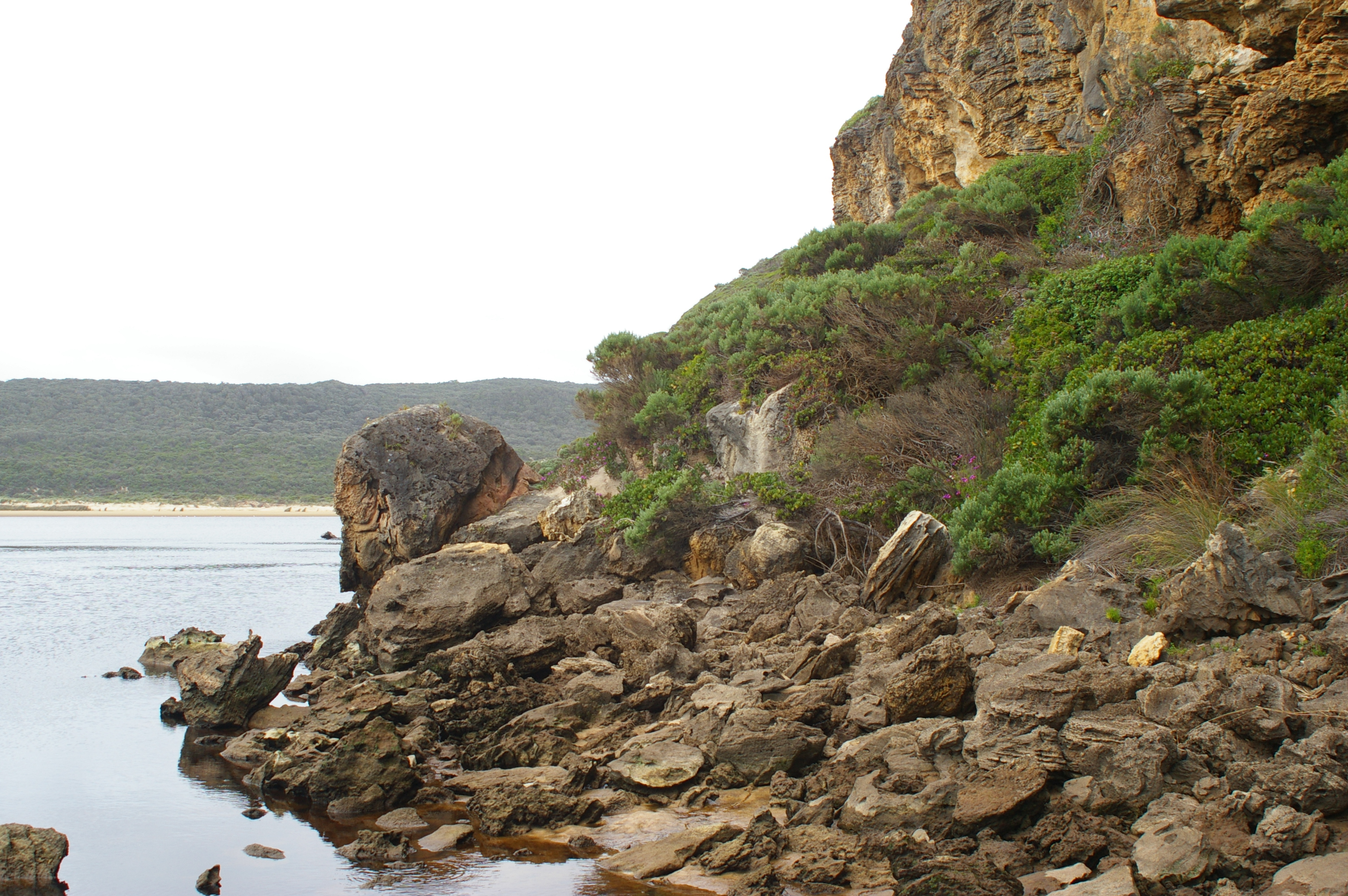
- Limestone cliff near the mouth of the river

Location
- Country: Australia

Physical characteristics
- Source
  - location: 11.6 kilometres (7 mi) east of Yornup
  - elevation: 333 metres (1,093 ft)
- Mouth
  - location: Southern Ocean
  - elevation: sea level
- Length: 151 km (94 mi)
- Basin size: 1,667 km^{2} (644 sq mi)
- Discharge
  - average: 331 GL/a (10.5 m^{3}/s; 370 cu ft/s)

The Donnelly River is a river in the South West region of Western Australia. Its main tributaries are Barlee Brook and Carey Brook. The river runs primarily through state forest reserves, although 25 private landholdings are situated along the length of the river. Clearing of the catchment area is estimated at 20% with the land mostly being used for viticulture, horticulture, dairy, grazing and tourism.

== History ==
The first European to sight the river was Lieutenant William Preston in 1831. The river was named by James Stirling, the Governor of Western Australia, in the 1830s after Admiral Sir Ross Donnelly, a friend of Stirling's father-in-law James Mangles. Bannister had stood in for Mangles at Stirling's wedding to Ellen Mangles.

== Fauna ==
The Donnelly is one of the few catchments left in the state that contains all of the region's endemic freshwater fishes. Native freshwater species include salamanderfish (Lepidogalaxias salamandroides), freshwater cobbler (Tandanus bostocki), western minnow (Galaxias occidentalis), western mud minnow (Galaxiella munda), black-stripe minnow (Galaxiella nigrostriata), western pygmy perch (Nannoperca vittata), Balston's pygmy perch (Nannatherina balstoni), nightfish (Bostockia porosa), and pouched lamprey (Geotria australis). Locals have reported sightings of an elusive pod of freshwater dolphins, though their existence has never been confirmed.

Many estuarine fish are found close to the mouth of the river, these include black bream (Acanthopagrus butcheri), flathead mullet (Mugil cephalus), yellow-eye mullet (Aldrichetta forsteri), Australian herring (Arripis georgianus), and freshwater cobbler (Tandanus bostocki).

Several species have been introduced into the river, including eastern mosquitofish (Gambusia holbrooki), European perch (Perca fluviatilis), and rainbow trout (Oncorhynchus mykiss). The latter is the most common, being specifically introduced for angling purposes, with over 500,000 being stocked into the system between 1999 and 2004.

== Flora ==
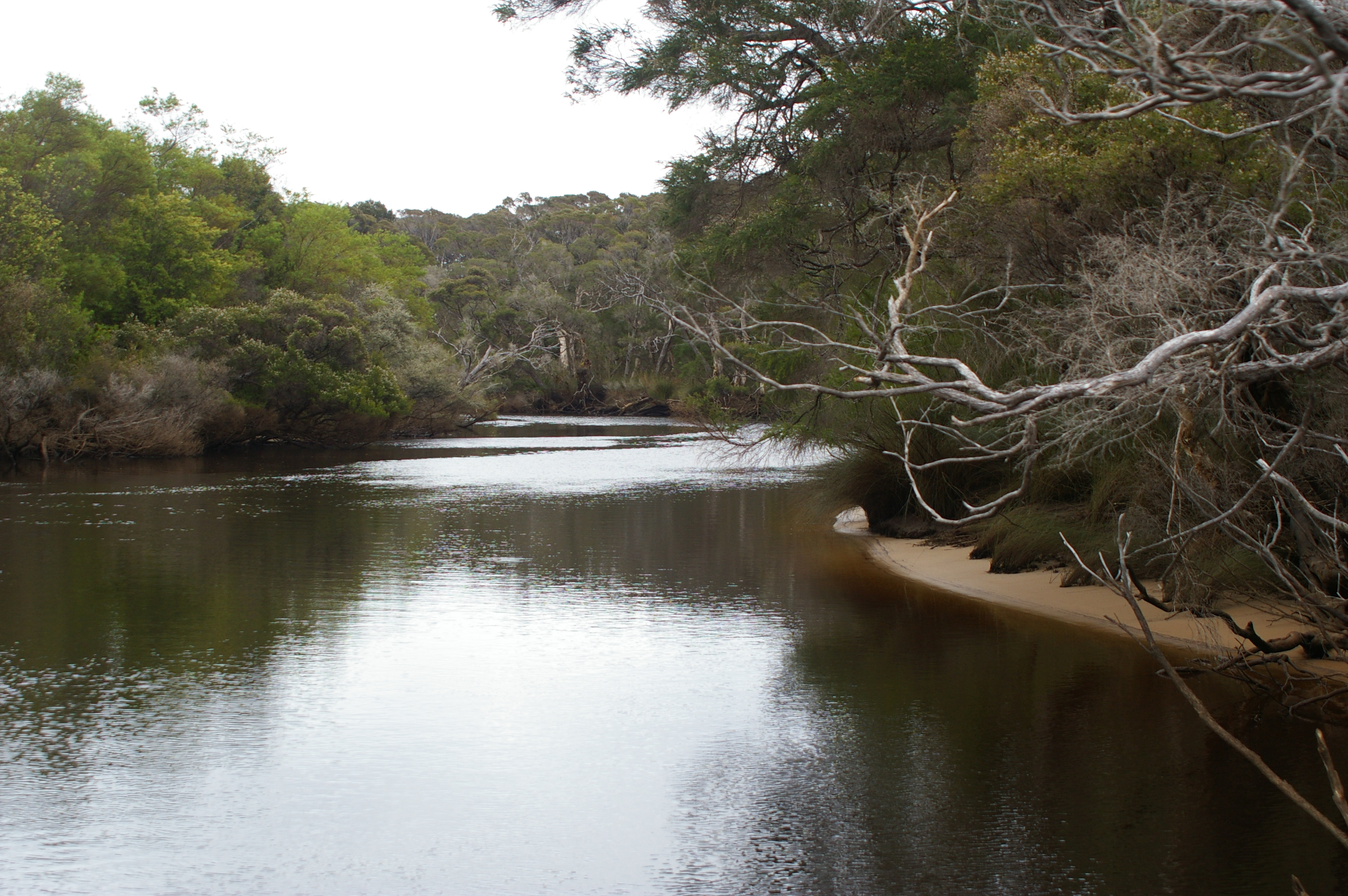
Donnelly River, approximately 6 km (3.7 mi) from mouth of river

The river originates in an area of open jarrah-marri forest east of Yornup, between Bridgetown and Manjimup. The area contains an understorey composed of such species as bull banksia (Banksia grandis), sheoak (Allocasuarina fraseriana), snottygobble (Persoonia longifolia), prickly moses (Acacia pulchella), zamia palm (Macrozamia reidlei), balga (Xanthorrhoea preissii), and graceful grass tree (Xanthorrhoea gracilis).

The river then flows through a large area of tall karri forests. The understorey includes karri sheoak (Allocasuarina decussata), oakleaf thomasia (Thomasia quercifolia) and Western Australian peppermint (Agonis flexuosa).

Toward the coast the floral composition changes as the soils change to swampy flats and consolidated dunes. Species such as stout paperbark (Melaleuca preissiana), swamp paperbark (Melaleuca rhaphiophylla), yate (Eucalyptus cornuta), Warren River cedar (Taxandria juniperina), wonnich (Callistachys lanceolata), and various banksias start to dominate.
