= Toothless catfish =

Conservation status
- Least Concern (IUCN 3.1)

Scientific classification
- Kingdom: Animalia
- Phylum: Chordata
- Class: Actinopterygii
- Division: Teleostei
- Order: Siluriformes
- Family: Plotosidae
- Genus: Anodontiglanis; Rendahl (de), 1922
- Species: A. dahli

Binomial name
- Anodontiglanis dahli Rendahl, 1922

Species of fish

The toothless catfish (Anodontiglanis dahli) is a species of catfish (order Siluriformes) of the family Plotosidae. This fish originates from northern Australia, including Fitzroy, Daly, East Alligator, Roper, Mitchell, and Archer Rivers, in lentic and lotic freshwater habitats. It grows up to about 40 centimetres (16 in) TL.

The toothless catfish lives in clear, flowing waters. It has been reported to be solitary, but it also often forms aggregations around log snags or in deeper rock pools. It also occurs in sandy bottoms around the cover of woody debris and in flooded lagoons. This fish feeds on aquatic insects, mollusks, prawns, and bottom detritus by thrusting its snout into the sandy bottom. Nothing is specifically known about the breeding biology, but it probably spawns early in the wet season. This fish most definitely does have teeth (in its pharynx).
