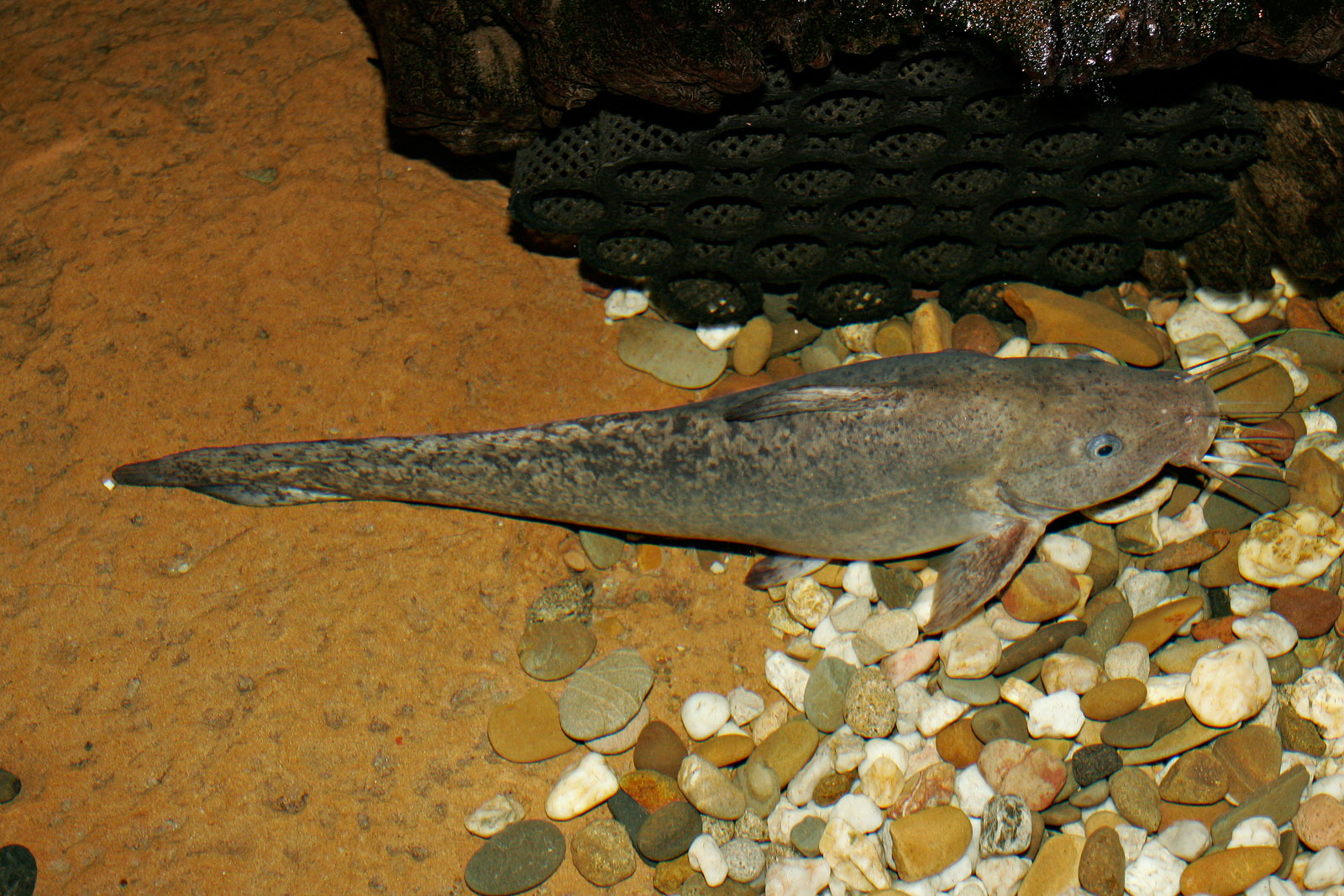

Conservation status
- Least Concern (IUCN 3.1)

Scientific classification
- Kingdom: Animalia
- Phylum: Chordata
- Class: Actinopterygii
- Division: Teleostei
- Order: Siluriformes
- Family: Plotosidae
- Genus: Tandanus
- Species: T. tandanus

Binomial name
- Tandanus tandanus (Mitchell, 1838)

Synonyms
- Plotosus tandanus Mitchell, 1838

= Eel-tailed catfish =

Species of fish

The eel-tailed catfish (Tandanus tandanus) is a species of catfish (order Siluriformes) of the family Plotosidae. This fish is also known as dewfish, freshwater catfish, jewfish, and tandan.

This species is a freshwater fish native to the Murray-Darling river system of eastern Australia. The scientific name for eel-tailed catfish comes from a name for the fish in an unidentified Aboriginal Australian language — Tandan — which Major Thomas Livingston Mitchell recorded on his 1832 expedition.

== Description ==
Eel-tailed catfish commonly grow to about 50.0 centimetres (19.7 inches) and weigh about 1.8 kilograms (4.0 pounds). Fish of this species may grow up to about 90.0 cm (35.4 in) and weigh up to 6.0 kg (13.2 lb). Eel-tailed catfish may live up to about 8 years.

Eel-tailed catfish have large heads with thick and fleshy lips and tubular nostrils. The skin is tough and smooth. Body coloration in adults varies from olive-green to brown, black or purplish on their backs and white on the underside.

A downturned mouth with fleshy lips surrounded by a number of barbels assist them with feeding. They are a solid, almost cylindrical, elongate fish, with the posterior half of their body tapering into a pointed eel-like tail. A continuous fin margin surrounds this tapering posterior half of the body. Their eyes are small.

The eel-tail catfish has 4 pairs of barbels surrounding the mouth, and sharp serrated dorsal- and pectoral-fin spines which are venomous and can cause a very painful wound.

== Ecology ==
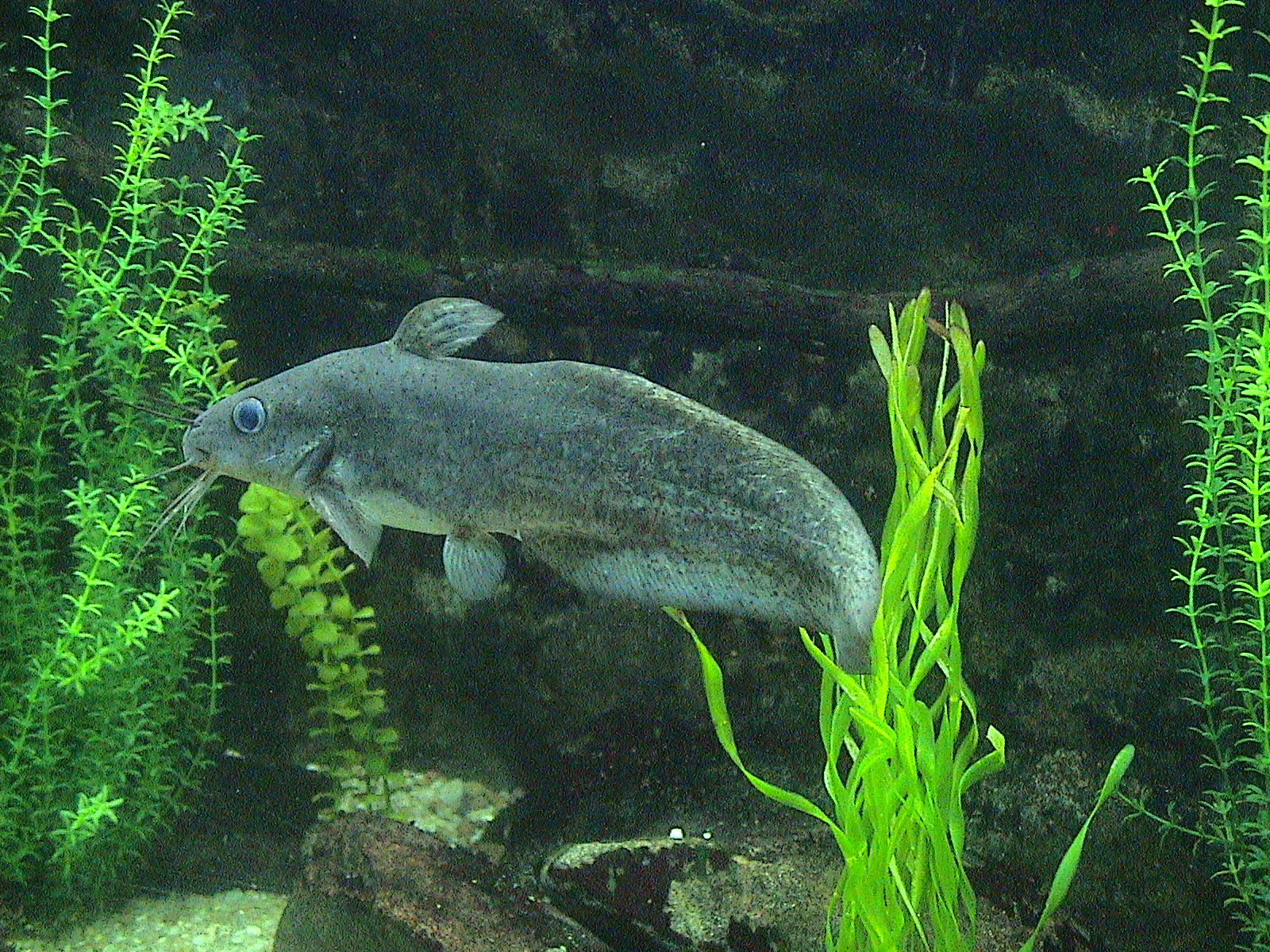
Eel-tailed catfish at Adelaide Zoo

The eel-tailed catfish inhabits slow-moving streams, lakes and ponds with fringing vegetation. It swims close to the sand or gravel bottoms. This species is more abundant in lakes than in flowing water. Though they are usually solitary, juveniles may form aggregations. The eel-tailed catfish is found in most freshwater habitats of the Murray-Darling river system except for the upland, sub-alpine and alpine headwaters of southern tributaries. It is also present in speciated but undescribed forms in several east coast systems in northern New South Wales due to natural river capture events.

Juvenile eel-tailed catfish feed on zooplankton and small insects, particularly chironomid larvae. Fish over about 100 mm also eat small fish, while adults include shrimps, crayfish in the warmer months and midge larvae in winter. In addition, they eat mollusks and dragonfly, caddis and mayfly larvae. The eel-tailed catfish is host for a number of intestinal parasites including cestodes and nematodes.

Eel-tailed catfish spawn in spring and midsummer, when the water temperature increases to 20–24 °C (68–75 °F). The nest is built about one or two weeks before spawning. They build large nests up to a metre in diameter with small stones and gravel, within which the eggs are laid. One parent, sometimes both, guard the eggs until they hatch.

== Conservation ==
Freshwater catfish were once widespread in eastern Australia; however, populations have suffered severe declines in both distribution and abundance since the 1980s.

The Murray-Darling populations of eel-tailed catfish have declined significantly over recent decades. Most populations in the southern half of the Murray-Darling river system are extinct or nearly so. The species remains relatively common in coastal catchments from the Hunter River (NSW) north.

Numerous factors are thought to have contributed to the decline of freshwater catfish populations in the Murray-Darling Basin since the 1970s. These include habitat degradation and barriers to movement, and increased predation by and competition with introduced species such as carp (which has similar feeding habits) and redfin perch. Severe siltation also probably severely impacts upon the species spawning by smothering the rocks and pebbles they use to build nests.

The freshwater catfish population in the Murray-Darling Basin is listed as: New South Wales Fisheries Management Act 1994: Endangered; Victorian Flora and Fauna Guarantee Act 1988: Threatened; South Australian Fisheries Management Act 2007: Protected.

Populations in several rivers and impoundments in the northern half of the Murray-Darling appear secure for now. The species does well in the upland reaches of these northern Murray-Darling rivers; this is in contrast to its absence from the upland reaches of southern Murray-Darling rivers, where water temperatures are lower.
