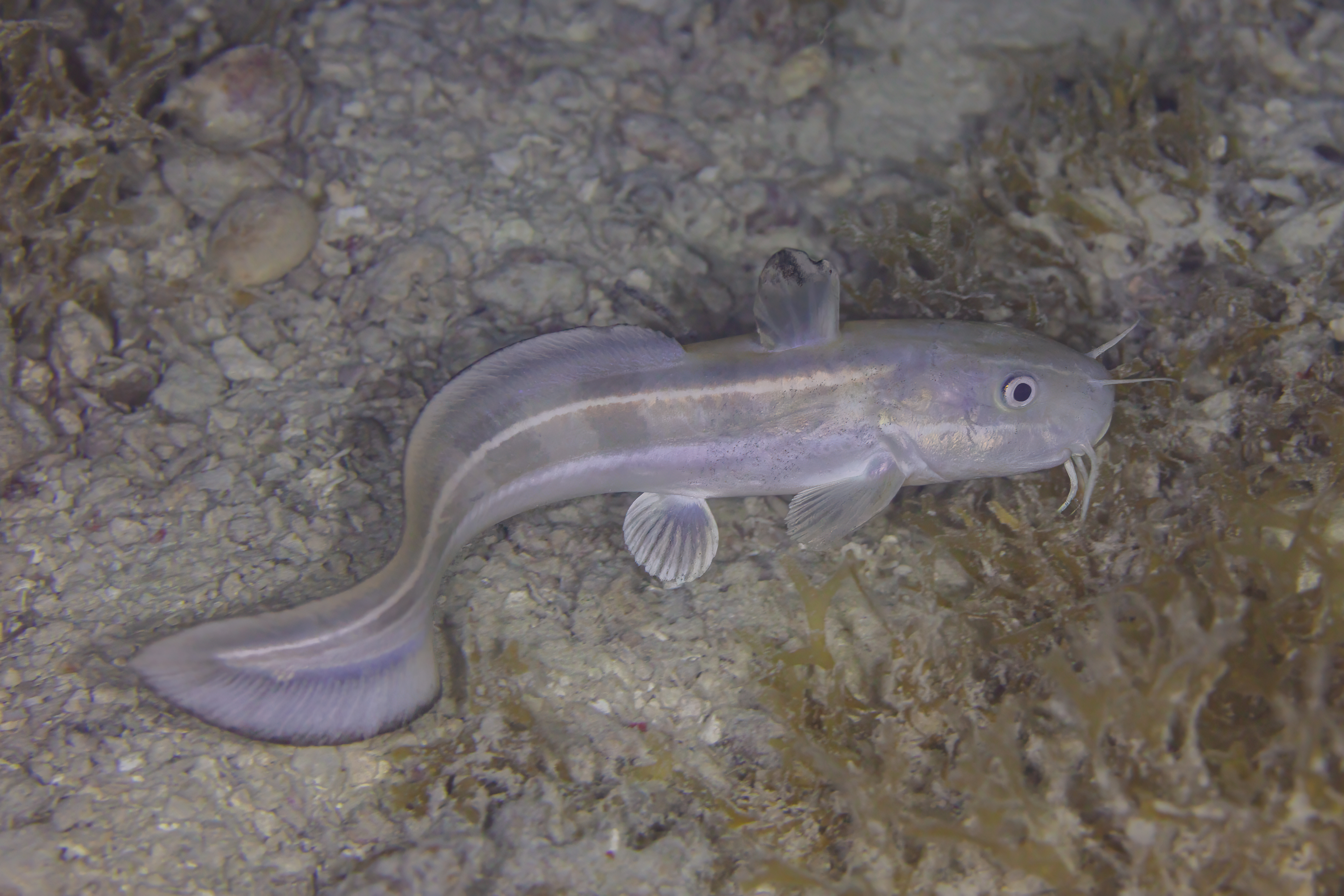
- Adult Plotosus lineatus in Zanzibar, Tanzania

Conservation status
- Least Concern (IUCN 3.1)

Scientific classification
- Kingdom: Animalia
- Phylum: Chordata
- Class: Actinopterygii
- Division: Teleostei
- Order: Siluriformes
- Family: Plotosidae
- Genus: Plotosus
- Species: P. lineatus

Binomial name
- Plotosus lineatus (Thunberg, 1787)

Synonyms
- Silurus lineatus Thunberg, 1787; Silurus arab Forsskål, 1775; Platystacus anguillaris Bloch, 1794; Plotosus anguillaris (Bloch, 1794); Plotosus thunbergianus Lacépède, 1803; Plotosus marginatus Anonymous [Bennett], 1830; Plotoseus ikapor Lesson, 1831; Plotosus vittatus Swainson, 1839; Plotosus castaneus Valenciennes, 1840; Plotosus lineatus Valenciennes, 1840; Plotosus castaneoides Bleeker, 1851; Plotosus arab Bleeker, 1862; Plotosus flavolineatus Whitley, 1941; Plotosus brevibarbus Bessednov, 1967

= Plotosus lineatus =

Species of fish

Plotosus lineatus, commonly known as the striped eel catfish, is a species of catfish belonging to the eeltail family Plotosidae. Like most other members of the genus, this species possesses highly venomous spines that can be used to sting when threatened; the venom can cause mild to severe symptoms in humans. This species is native to the Indo-Pacific but is now present in the Mediterranean via Lessepsian migration through the Suez Canal.

== Description ==
Plotosus lineatus can reach a maximum length of 32 cm (13 in), and the body is brown with cream-colored or white longitudinal bands. The second dorsal, caudal and anal fins are fused together as in eels, but the rest of the body is quite similar to that of a freshwater catfish. The mouth is surrounded by four pairs of barbels, four on the upper jaw and four on the lower jaw. Each of the first dorsal and the pectoral fins has a highly venomous spine.

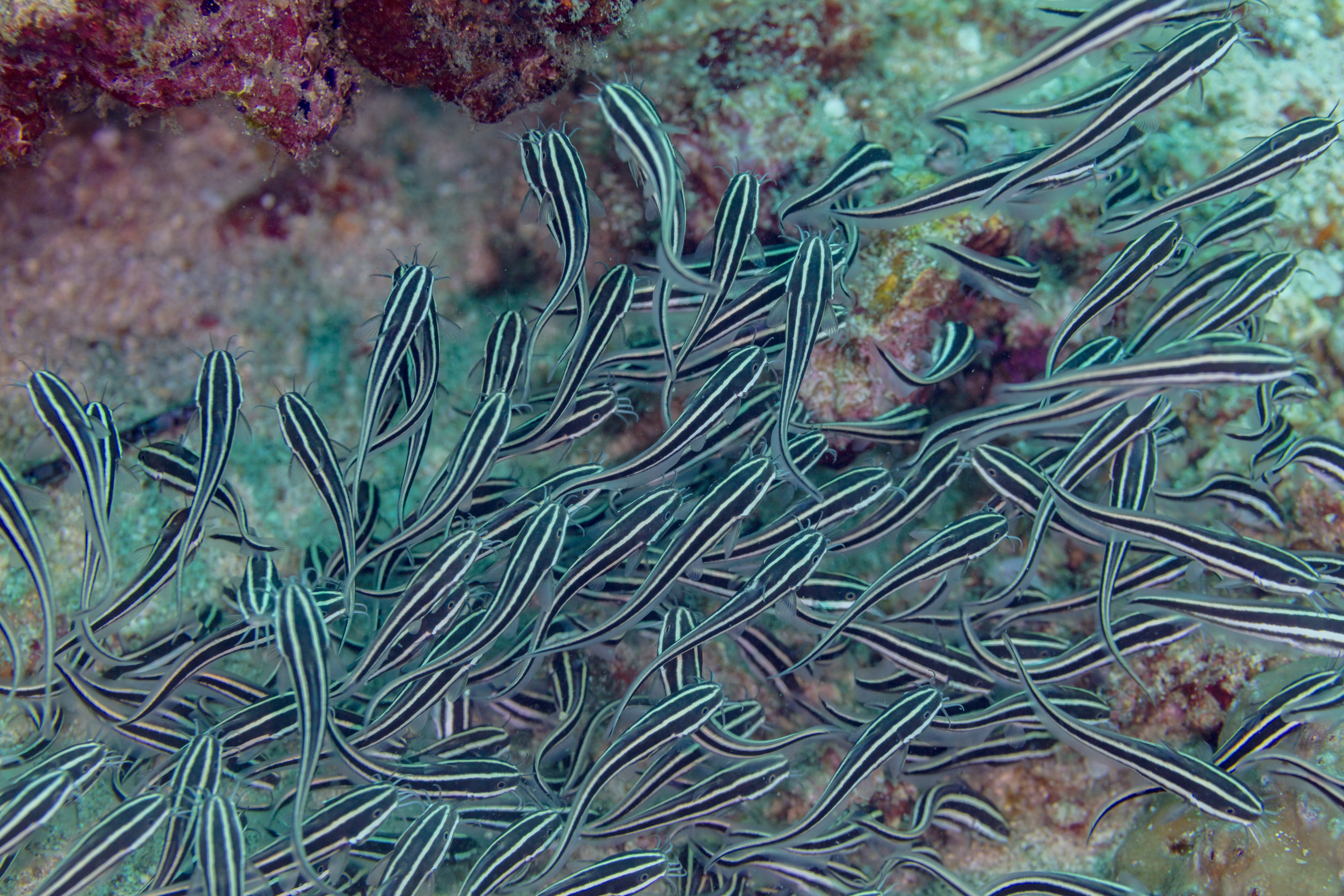
Plotosus lineatus school Anilao, Philippines

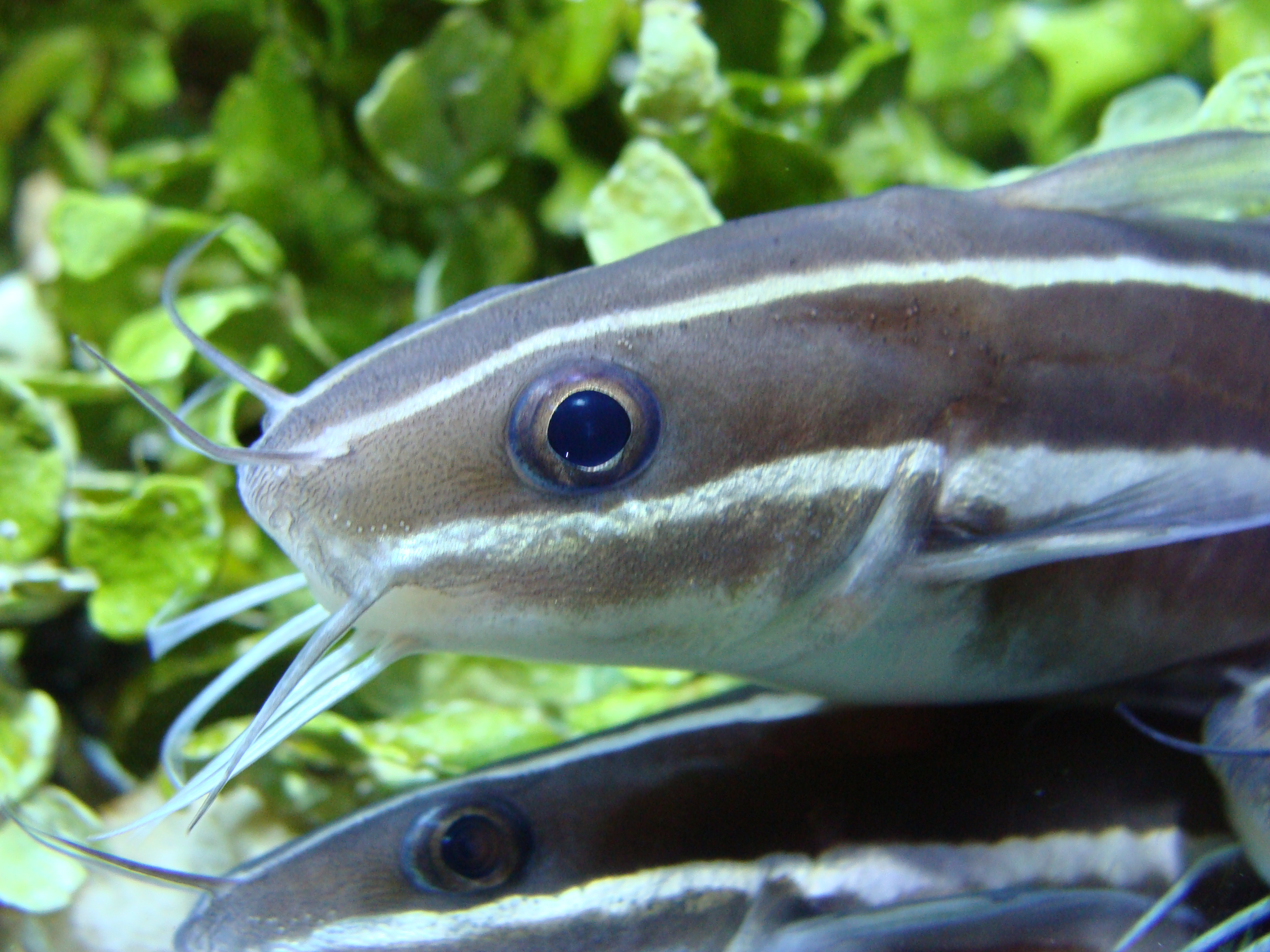
Plotosus lineatus in Sala Humboldt of Aquarium Finisterrae (House of the Fishes), in A Coruña, Galicia, Spain.

Swimming in captivity

== Distribution ==
Plotosus lineatus occurs in the Indo-Pacific; this includes the western Pacific (e.g. Singapore). Since 2002, it has been recorded in the eastern Mediterranean Sea as well, and is now common from Levantine waters to the Gulf of Gabes. It sometimes enters freshwater ecosystems in East Africa and Madagascar.

== Habitat ==
Plotosus lineatus is found mainly in coral reefs. It is also found in estuaries, tide pools and open coasts.

== Behavior and reproduction ==
Juveniles of Plotosus lineatus form dense ball-shaped schools of about 100 fish, while adults are solitary or occur in smaller groups of around 20 and are known to hide under ledges during the day. Adults search and stir the sand incessantly for crustaceans, mollusks, worms, and sometimes fish.

Plotosus lineatus is an oviparous fish; the eggs are demersal and upon hatching, fries become a part of zooplankton.

== Venom ==
Plotosus lineatus has venomous spines on their fins that they use to sting for self-defense. Their skin also possess cells that secrete venom. The venom is composed of crinotoxins and plototoxins, which are mainly hemolytic but are also edema-forming, nociceptive, and tetanic. Symptoms from P. lineatus stings range from mild to severe, and include extreme pain, dizziness, erythema, edema, necrosis, numbness, vomiting, muscle spasms, respiratory distress, shock, and sepsis. Though dangerous to humans, with many envenomation incidents happening when fishermen are trying to handle the fish caught in their nets, no death has actually been recorded from stinging. The sting is known to be lethal to fish, crabs, and rodents in laboratory tests.

== Invasiveness ==
In Europe, P. lineatus is included since 2019 in the list of Invasive Alien Species of Union concern (the Union list). This implies that this species cannot be imported, bred, transported, commercialized, or intentionally released into the environment in the whole of the European Union.

== In popular culture ==
The fish is known in Israel as "Nasrallah fish" after the Lebanese cleric and political figure Hassan Nasrallah.

== Bibliography ==
- Fenner, Robert M. (2001). The Conscientious Marine Aquarist. Neptune City, New Jersey: T.F.H. Publications.
- Helfman, G.; B. Collette; D. Facey (1997). The diversity of fishes. Malden, Massachusetts: Blackwell Science.
- Moyle, P.; J. Cech (2000). Fishes: An Introduction to Ichthyology (4th ed.). Upper Saddle River, New Jersey: Prentice-Hall.
- Nelson, Joseph S.; Grande, Terry C.; Wilson, Mark V. H. (2016). Fishes of the World (5th ed.). Hoboken: John Wiley and Sons. doi:10.1002/9781119174844. ISBN 978-1-118-34233-6.
- Wheeler, A. (1985). The World Encyclopedia of Fishes (2nd. ed.). London: Macdonald.
- Lieske, E.; R. Myers (1994). Coral reef fishes. Indo-Pacific & Caribbean including the Red Sea. Collins Pocket Guide. HarperCollins Publishers.
