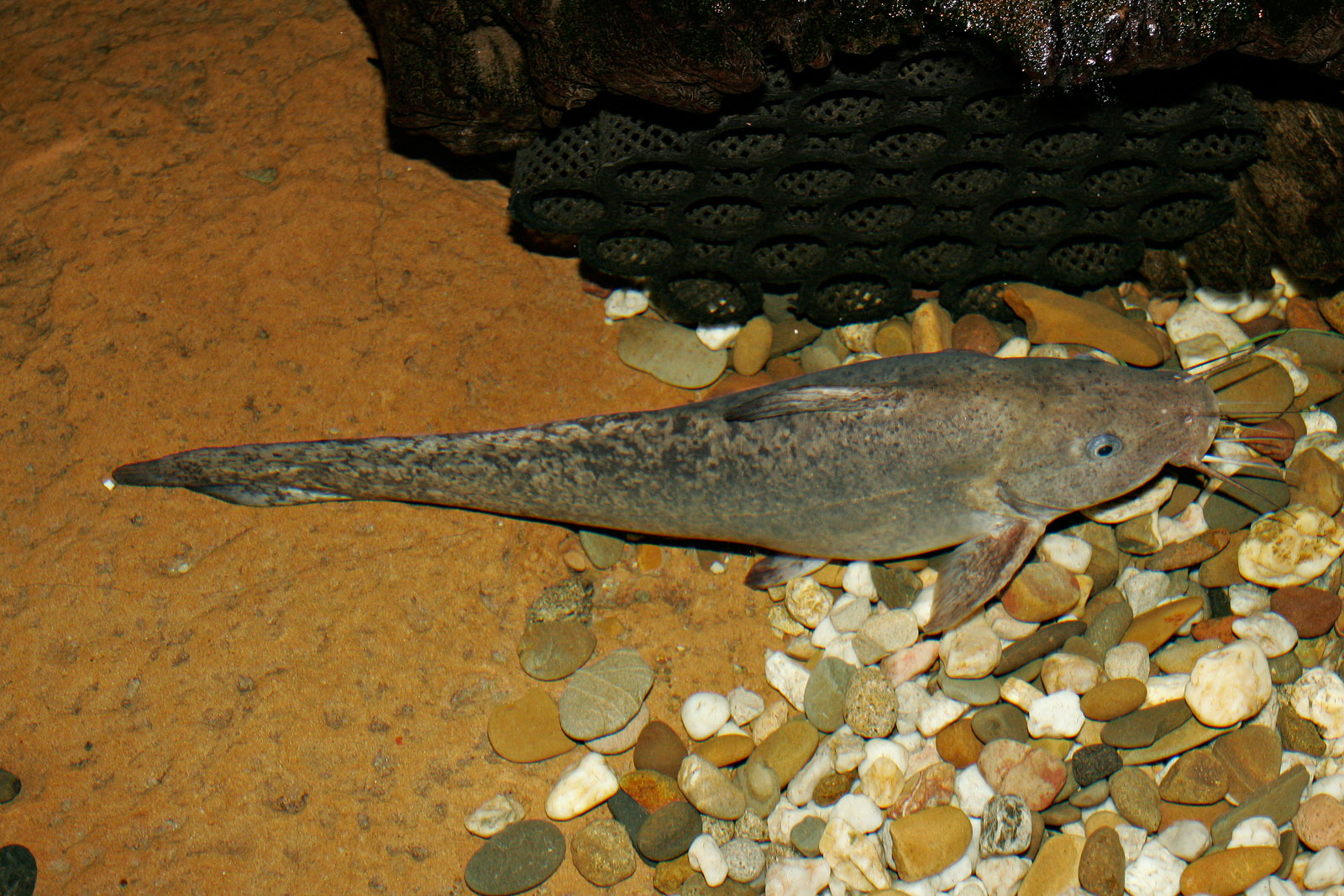
- Tandanus tandanus

Scientific classification
- Domain: Eukaryota
- Kingdom: Animalia
- Phylum: Chordata
- Class: Actinopterygii
- Order: Siluriformes
- Family: Plotosidae
- Genus: Tandanus; Mitchell, 1838

Type species
- Plotosus (Tandanus) tandanus Mitchell, 1838

Synonyms
- Copidoglanis Günther, 1864; Anyperistius Ogilby, 1908

= Tandanus =

Genus of catfish

Tandanus is a genus of eeltail catfishes endemic to Australia.

== Species ==
There are currently 4 recognized species in this genus:

- Tandanus bostocki Whitley, 1944 (Freshwater cobbler)
- Tandanus tandanus Mitchell, 1838 (Tandan catfish)
- Tandanus tropicanus Welsh, Jerry & Burrows, 2014 (Wet Tropics Tandan)
- Tandanus bellingerensis Welsh, Jerry, Burrows & Rourke, 2017 (Wilang)
