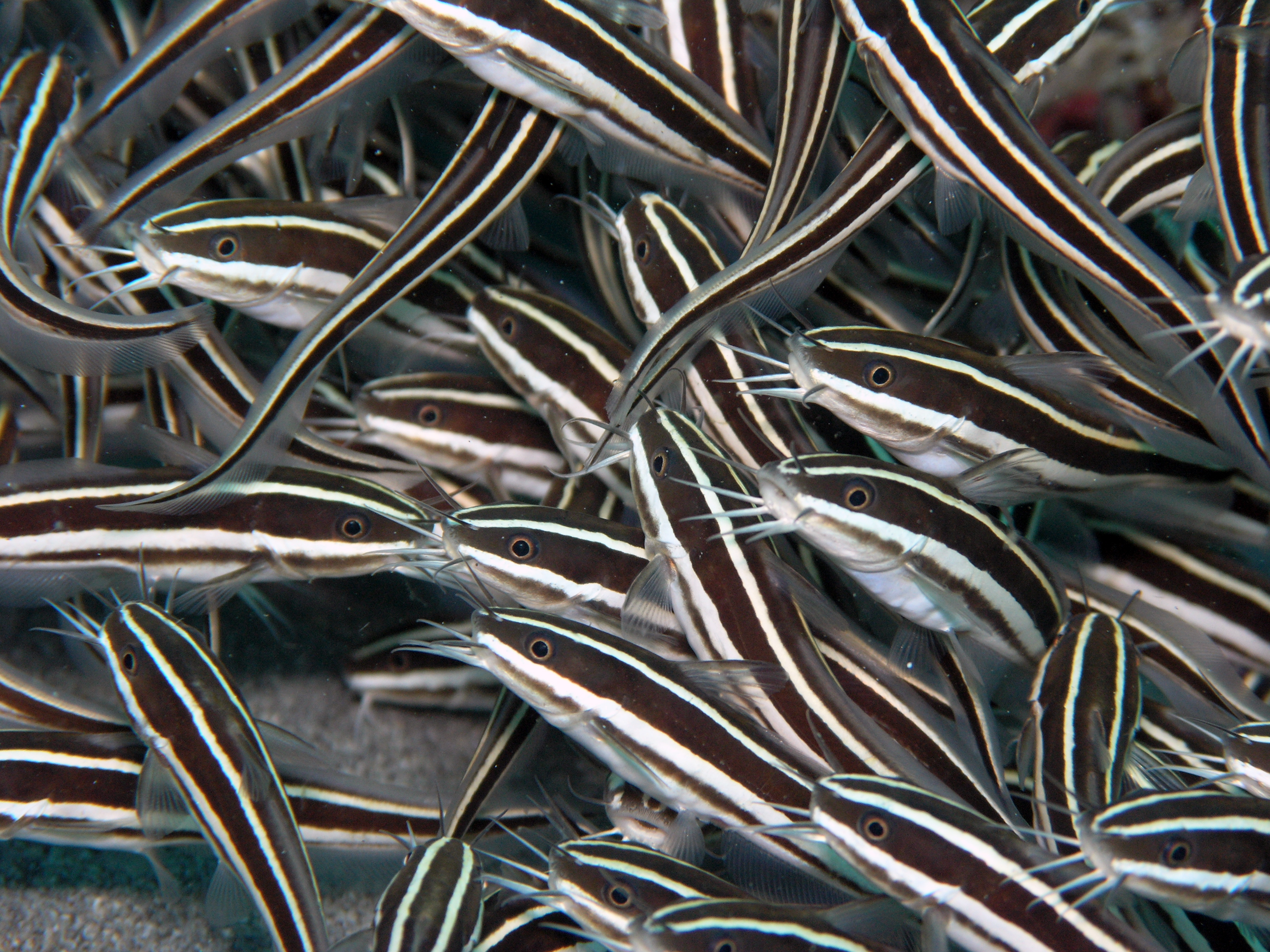
- Striped eel catfish, Plotosus lineatus

Scientific classification
- Kingdom: Animalia
- Phylum: Chordata
- Class: Actinopterygii
- Order: Siluriformes
- Family: Plotosidae
- Genus: Plotosus; Lacépède, 1803

Type species
- Platystacus anguillaris Bloch, 1794

Synonyms
- Deportator Gistel, 1848

= Plotosus =

Genus of fishes

Plotosus is a genus of eeltail catfishes native to the Indian Ocean, the western Pacific Ocean and New Guinea.

== Species ==
There are currently nine recognized species in this genus:

- Plotosus abbreviatus Boulenger, 1895
- Plotosus canius Hamilton, 1822 (Gray eel-catfish)
- Plotosus fisadoha Ng & Sparks, 2002
- Plotosus japonicus Yoshino & Kishimoto, 2008 (Japanese Striped eel-catfish)(ゴンズイ)
- Plotosus limbatus Valenciennes, 1840 (Darkfin eel-catfish)
- Plotosus lineatus (Thunberg, 1787) (Striped eel-catfish)
- Plotosus nhatrangensis Prokofiev, 2008
- Plotosus nkunga Gomon & W. R. Taylor, 1982 (Stinging eel-catfish)
- Plotosus papuensis Weber, 1910 (Papuan eel-catfish)

== Distribution ==
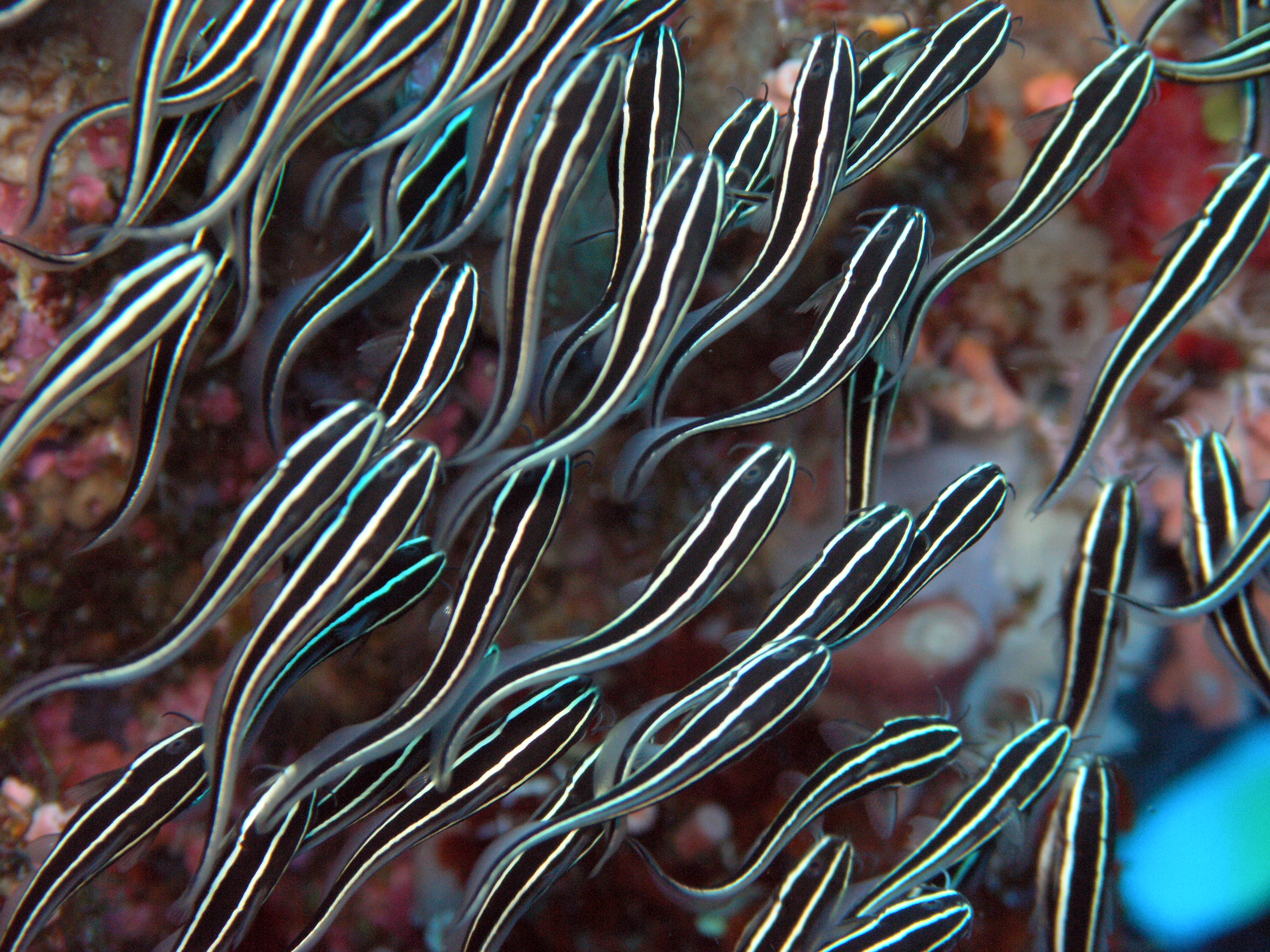
Plotosus lineatus swarming a reef coral.

P. canius originates from coastal regions of Thailand, Sundaland, Sulawesi, Moluccas, and India, and into the lower Mekong River. P. fisadoha is known only from Southeastern Madagascar. P. limbatus inhabits marine and brackish waters in the Western Indian Ocean and Arabian Sea. P. lineatus occurs in the eastern Mediterranean, marine waters in the Indian Ocean and Western Pacific, and sometimes entering freshwaters in East Africa and Madagascar. P. nkunga is distributed in southern Africa from Boknes to Boteler Point, and to Zanzibar, in marine waters but also entering freshwater. P. papuensis ranges in the south of the island of New Guinea.

== Description ==
P. canius reaches the largest size, up to 150 centimetres (59 in) TL. P. limbatus grows to 41 cm (16 in) SL. P. lineatus grows to 32 cm (13 in) TL. P. nkunga grows to about 51 cm (20 in) SL. P. papuensis is recorded to reach 55 cm (22 in) TL, though it may reach 100 cm (40 in) TL according to local fishermen.

All species have been confirmed to be venomous except for P. fisadoha. The anterior spines of the dorsal and pectoral fins can inflict painful wounds. In P. lineatus, the highly venomous serrate spine of the first dorsal and each of the pectoral fins may even be fatal.

The scaleless skin of P. nkunga is coated in mucus, and its mouth is surrounded by four pairs of sensory barbels. The spines of the serrated dorsal fin, which can lock into an erect position, are covered in toxic mucus that can be poisonous to humans.

== Ecology ==
P. canius is found mostly in estuaries and lagoons, and sometimes up rivers in nearly fresh waters. It occurs in the lower parts of rivers in freshwater or brackish water and in coastal seas. P. limbatus occurs in estuaries and along open coasts. P. lineatus is the only catfish found in coral reefs; it is also found in estuaries, tide pools and open coasts. P. papuensis is found in turbid rivers and swampy lagoons and backwaters.

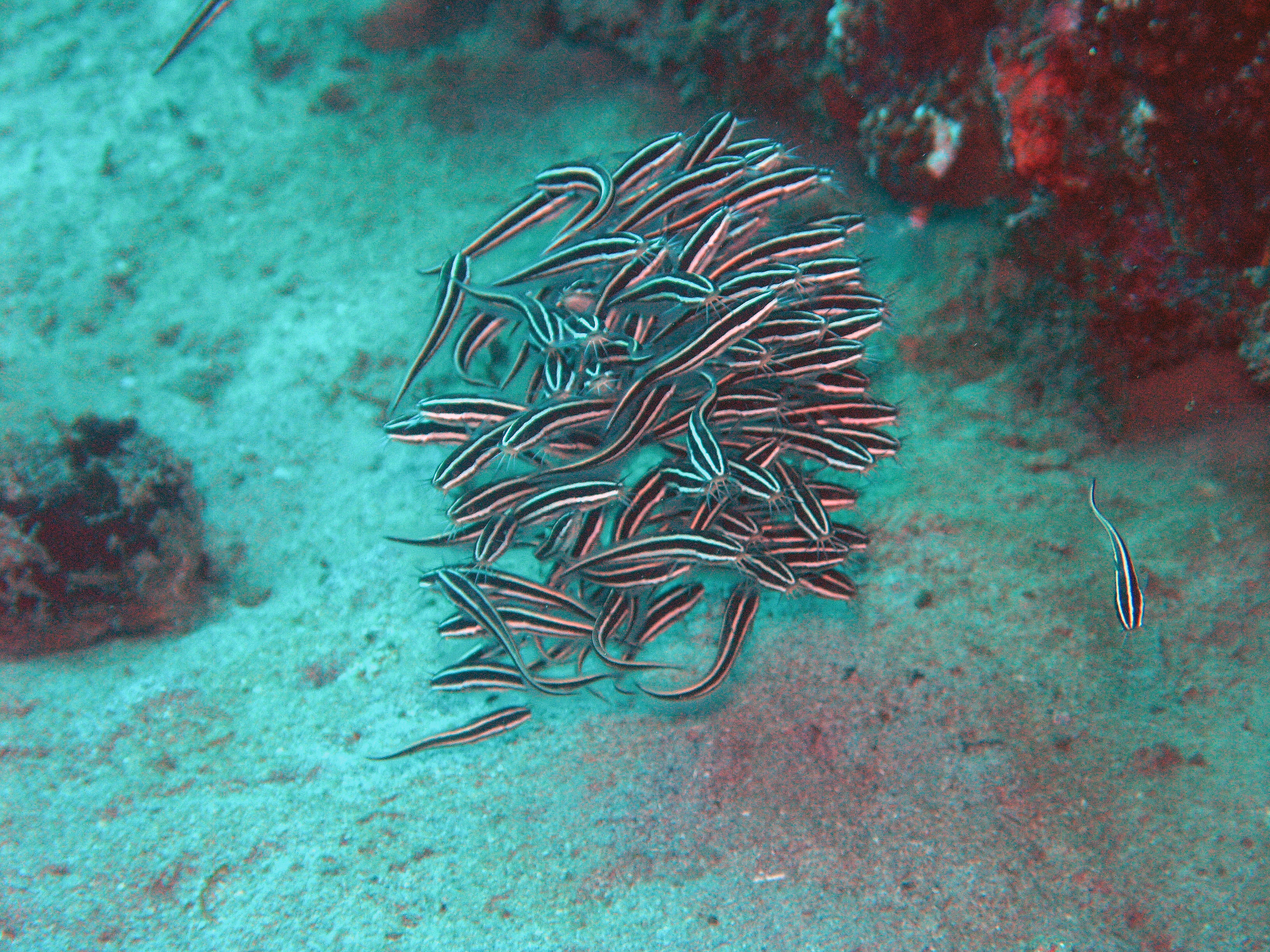
Plotosus lineatus schooling in a ball.

Juveniles of Plotosus species often form dense aggregations; in P. lineatus juveniles form dense ball-shaped schools of about 100 fish, while adults are solitary or occur in smaller groups of around 20 and are known to hide under ledges during the day.

Most species feed on crustaceans, mollusks, and fishes. Adult P. lineatus search and stir the sand incessantly for crustaceans, mollusks, worms, and sometimes fish. P. nkunga feeds mainly on benthic invertebrates, using its barbels to feel around in the mud for crab and small fish.

P. lineatus is an oviparous fish; this species has demersal eggs and planktonic larvae.

== Physiology ==
Unlike the freshwater Siluriformes from which it evolved, Plotosus has evolved long ampullary canals in its electrosensory organs (originally termed "ampullae of Lorenzini", though now the name is not used) as the voltage gradient across the skin is less than in fresh water and so they must extend deeper into the fish where the difference will be more marked in order that the maximal voltage be registered. Such deep canals are found in elasmobranchs, though not in the freshwater stingray Potamotrygon, indicating this time loss of extended canals rather than gain.
