= Porochilus =

Scientific classification
- Domain: Eukaryota
- Kingdom: Animalia
- Phylum: Chordata
- Class: Actinopterygii
- Order: Siluriformes
- Family: Plotosidae
- Genus: Porochilus; Weber, 1913

Type species
- Porochilus obbesi Weber, 1913

Genus of fishes

Porochilus is a genus of eeltail catfishes native to Australia and New Guinea.

== Species ==
There are currently four recognized species in this genus:

- Porochilus argenteus (Zietz (fi), 1896) (Silver tandan)
- Porochilus meraukensis (Weber, 1913) (Merauke tandan)
- Porochilus obbesi Weber, 1913 (Obbes' catfish)
- Porochilus rendahli (Whitley, 1928) (Rendahl's catfish)

== Description ==
P. meraukensis grows to 24 centimetres (9 in) TL, while P. obbesi grows to 12 cm (5 in) TL.

== Habitat ==
P. meraukensis is found in quiet backwaters or in well vegetated, swampy lagoons and lakes. P. obbesi lives in slow-flowing streams, backwaters, swamps and lily lagoons, usually among aquatic weeds such as eelgrass; it is also found in lakes. P. obbesi feeds on insects, prawns and mollusks.
