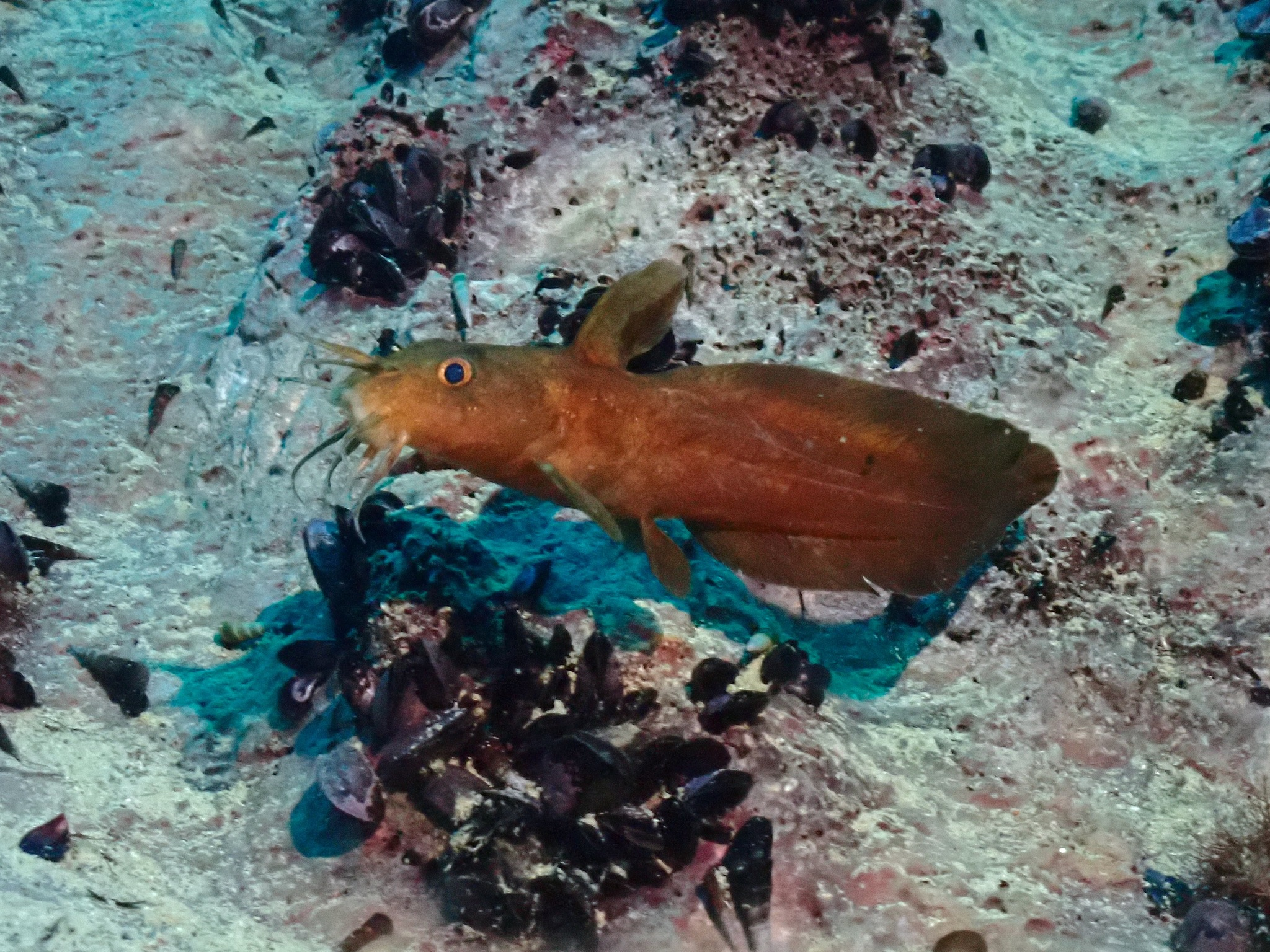
- Paraplotosus albilabris

Scientific classification
- Kingdom: Animalia
- Phylum: Chordata
- Class: Actinopterygii
- Order: Siluriformes
- Family: Plotosidae
- Genus: Paraplotosus; Bleeker, 1863

Type species
- Plotosus albilabris Valenciennes, 1840

Synonyms
- Endorrhis Ogilby, 1898

= Paraplotosus =

Genus of fishes

Paraplotosus is a genus of catfishes native to Australasia and South-east Asia.

== Species ==
There are currently three recognized species in this genus:

- Paraplotosus albilabris (Valenciennes, 1840) (Whitelipped eel-catfish)
- Paraplotosus butleri Allen, 1998
- Paraplotosus muelleri (Klunzinger, 1880) (Kimberley catfish)

P. albilabris originates from the Indo-Australian Archipelago, New Guinea, and Australia. This species grows to a length of about 134 centimetres (52.8 in) TL. It differs from P. butleri in having a shorter dorsal fin and shorter nasal barbels, a rounded pectoral fin shape, fewer upper procurrent caudal fin rays, and fewer gill rakers; it differs from P. muelleri in having a shorter dorsal fin and smaller eye. Its colour is highly variable, ranging from pale grey or yellowish brown to dark brown, nearly blackish, sometimes with pronounced dark mottling. It is generally whitish on the belly and ventral part of head. The fins are brown to blackish, frequently darker than the body. P. albilabris inhabits clear and turbid coral reefs in tropical areas, usually in areas with mixed sand, weed, and coral areas. This fish may be seen resting on sand bottoms under ledges or around coral. The adults live alone or in small groups. The anterior fin spines have potent venom.

P. butleri is known from coastal reefs in Northern Australia and the Western Pacific (New Guinea, Island Southeast Asia, Taiwan, and the Ryukyu Islands). This species grows to about 32.5 cm (12.8 in) SL. It differs from P. albilabris and P. muelleri in having a tall, sail-like first dorsal fin and extremely long nasal barbels, which extend posteriorly to the basal third of the pectoral fin or beyond. Small juveniles have a unique coloration consisting of a black head and body with a broad white to yellow margin on the first dorsal fin; also, the dorsal, anal, and caudal fins are connected and continuous. The adults are entirely black. P. butleri is restricted to coastal reefs; secretive, it is found in reef holes or under large rocks.

P. muelleri inhabits turbid coastal reefs in the Dampier Archipelago to the eastern Gulf of Carpentaria of northern Australia. This species grows to about 26.8 cm (10.6 in) SL. It differs from P. albilabris in having a taller dorsal fin and larger eye; it differs from P. butleri in having a shorter dorsal fin and shorter nasal barbels, a rounded pectoral fin shape, fewer procurrent caudal fin rays, and fewer gill rakers. It is brown in color, with the belly area and ventral surface of the head whitish. P. muelleri is restricted to turbid coastal reefs of mainland Australia and nearby islands.
