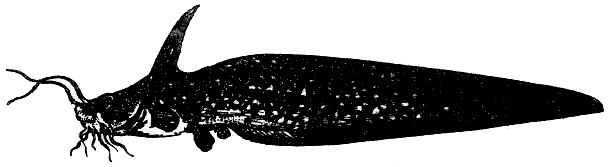
- Euristhmus microceps

Scientific classification
- Domain: Eukaryota
- Kingdom: Animalia
- Phylum: Chordata
- Class: Actinopterygii
- Order: Siluriformes
- Family: Plotosidae
- Genus: Euristhmus; Ogilby, 1899

Type species
- Plotosus elongatus Castelnau, 1878

Synonyms
- Exilichthys Whitley, 1933

= Euristhmus =

Genus of fishes

Euristhmus is a genus of eeltail catfishes native to the eastern Indian-western Pacific Oceans around Australia, New Guinea and Indonesia.

== Species ==
There are currently five recognized species in this genus:

- Euristhmus lepturus (Günther, 1864) (Long-tailed catfish)
- Euristhmus microceps (Richardson, 1845) (Smallhead catfish)
- Euristhmus microphthalmus Murdy & Ferraris, 2006
- Euristhmus nudiceps (Günther, 1880) (Naked-headed catfish)
- Euristhmus sandrae Murdy & Ferraris, 2006

E. lepturus is known from Exmouth Gulf, Western Australia to Sydney, New South Wales, and New Guinea, in freshwater, estuarine and near-shore marine habitats. E. microceps originates from Shark Bay to Broome, Western Australia, in near-shore habitats over soft bottoms. E. nudiceps inhabits near-shore habitats over soft bottoms of Shark Bay, Western Australia to Brisbane, Queensland, Australia, and New Guinea. E. nudiceps is found along coastlines and in estuaries, including freshwater reaches.

Euristhmus species grow to about 33.0–46.0 centimetres (13.0–18.1 inches) TL.
