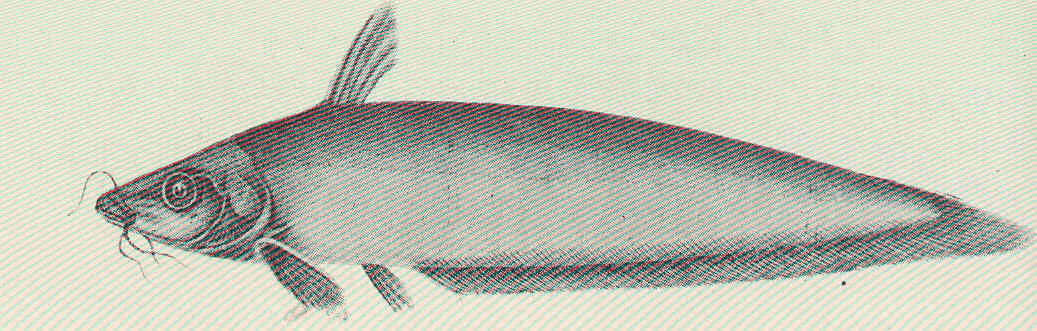
- Neosilurus hyrtlii

Scientific classification
- Kingdom: Animalia
- Phylum: Chordata
- Class: Actinopterygii
- Division: Teleostei
- Order: Siluriformes
- Family: Plotosidae
- Genus: Neosilurus; Steindachner, 1867

Type species
- Neosilurus hyrtlii Steindachner, 1867

Species
- See text.

Synonyms
- Neosilurus Castelnau, 1878; Eumeda Castelnau, 1878; Cainosilurus Macleay, 1881; Lambertia Perugia, 1894; Anyperistius Ogilby, 1908; Lambertichthys Whitley, 1938

= Neosilurus =

Genus of fishes

Neosilurus is a genus of eeltail catfishes native to Australia and New Guinea.

It is one of the largest genus of fresh water plotosid.

== Species ==
There are currently 11 recognized species in this genus:

- Neosilurus ater (Perugia, 1894) (Narrowfront tandan)
- Neosilurus brevidorsalis (Günther, 1867) (Shortfin tandan)
- Neosilurus coatesi (Allen, 1985)
- Neosilurus equinus (Weber, 1913) (Southern tandan)
- Neosilurus gjellerupi (Weber, 1913) (Northern tandan)
- Neosilurus gloveri Allen & Feinberg, 1998 (Dalhousie catfish)
- Neosilurus hyrtlii Steindachner, 1867 (Glencoe tandan)
- Neosilurus idenburgi (Nichols, 1940) (Idenburg tandan)
- Neosilurus mollespiculum Allen & Feinberg, 1998 (Soft-spined catfish)
- Neosilurus novaeguineae (Weber, 1907) (New Guinea tandan)
- Neosilurus pseudospinosus Allen & Feinberg, 1998 (False-spined catfish)
