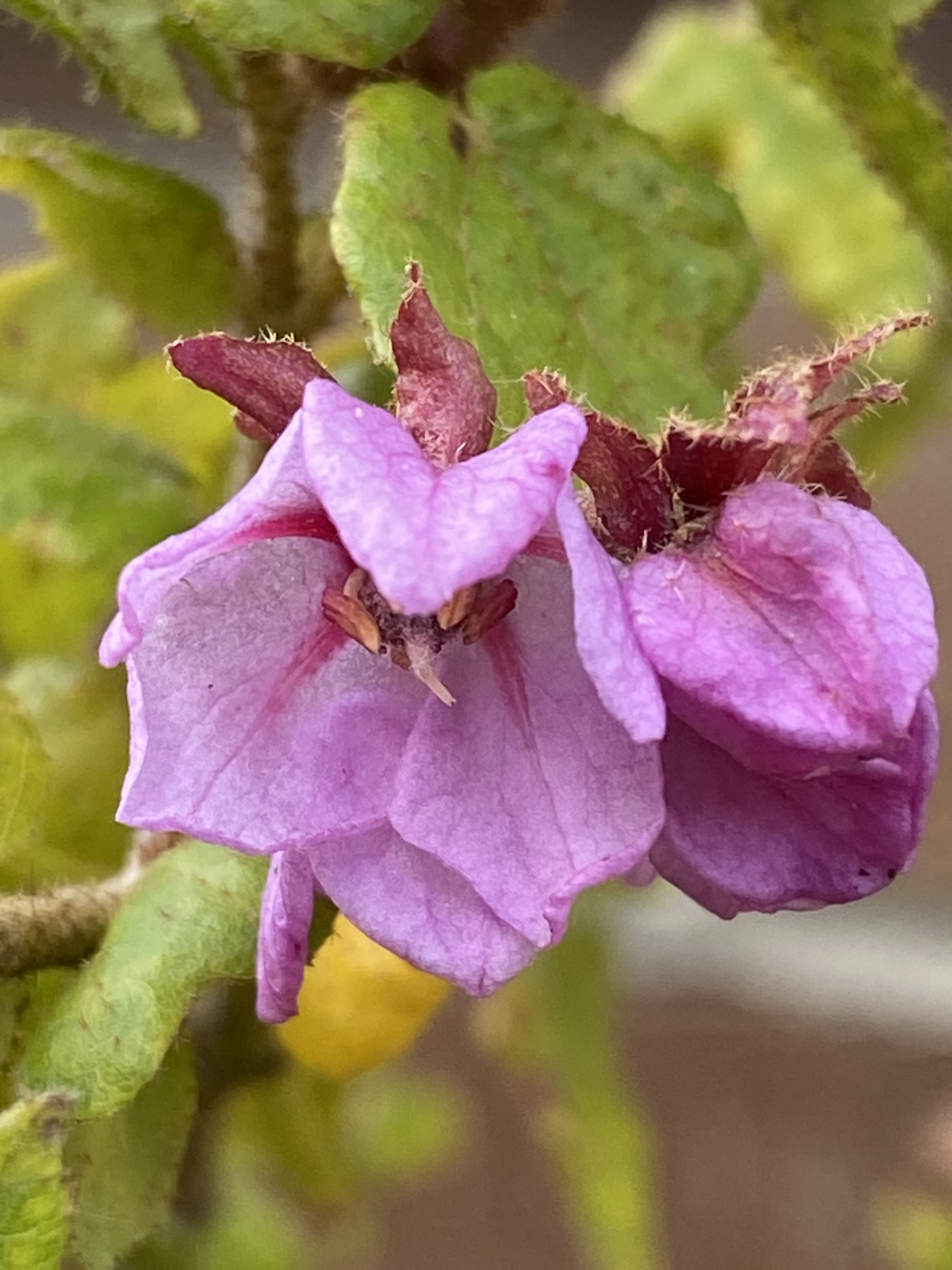

Conservation status
- Priority Four — Rare Taxa (DEC)

Scientific classification
- Kingdom: Plantae
- Clade: Tracheophytes
- Clade: Angiosperms
- Clade: Eudicots
- Clade: Rosids
- Order: Malvales
- Family: Malvaceae
- Genus: Thomasia
- Species: T. quercifolia

Binomial name
- Thomasia quercifolia (Andrews) J.Gay

Synonyms
- Lasiopetalum quercifolium Andrews

= Thomasia quercifolia =

Oak-leaf thomasia

Species of shrub

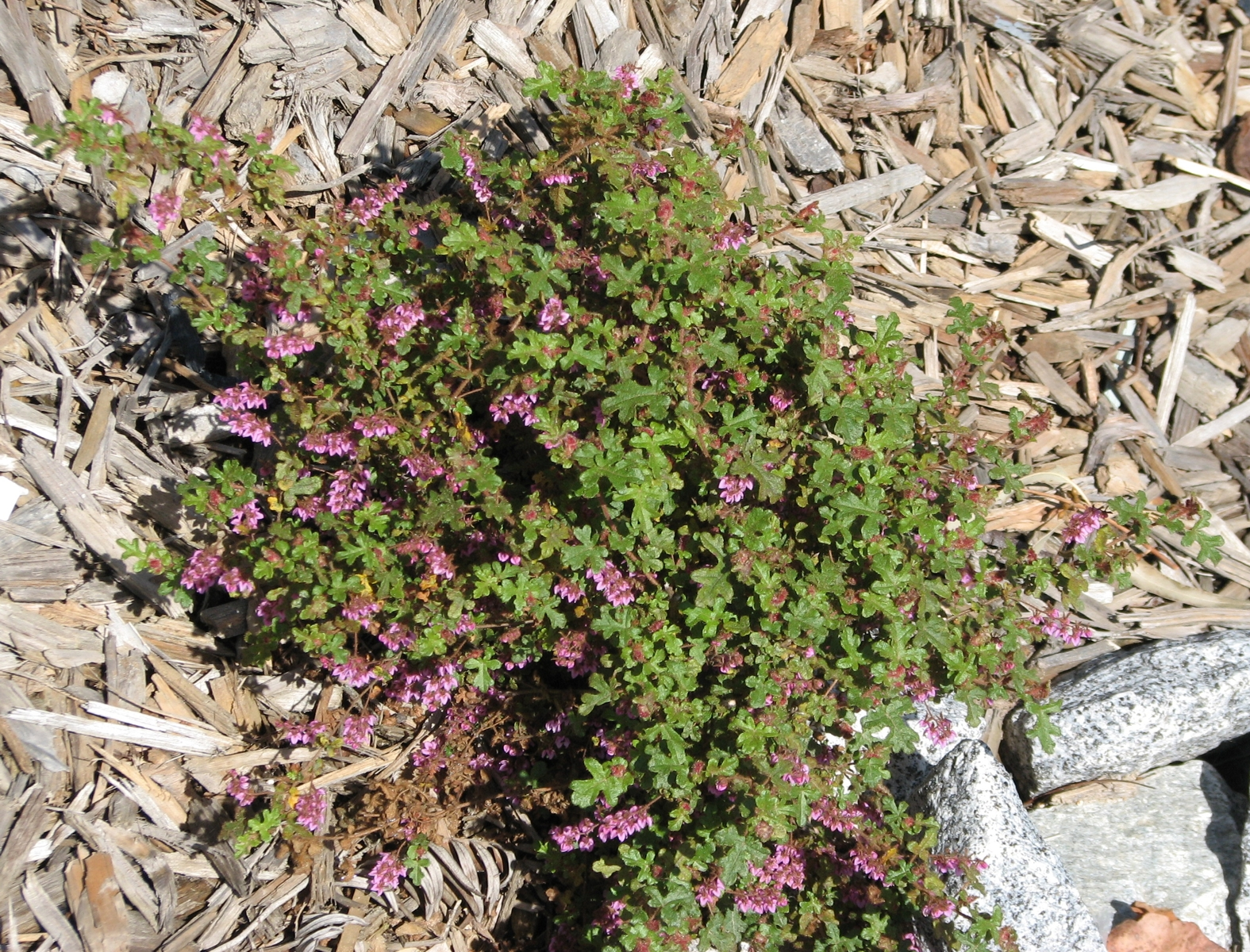
Habit

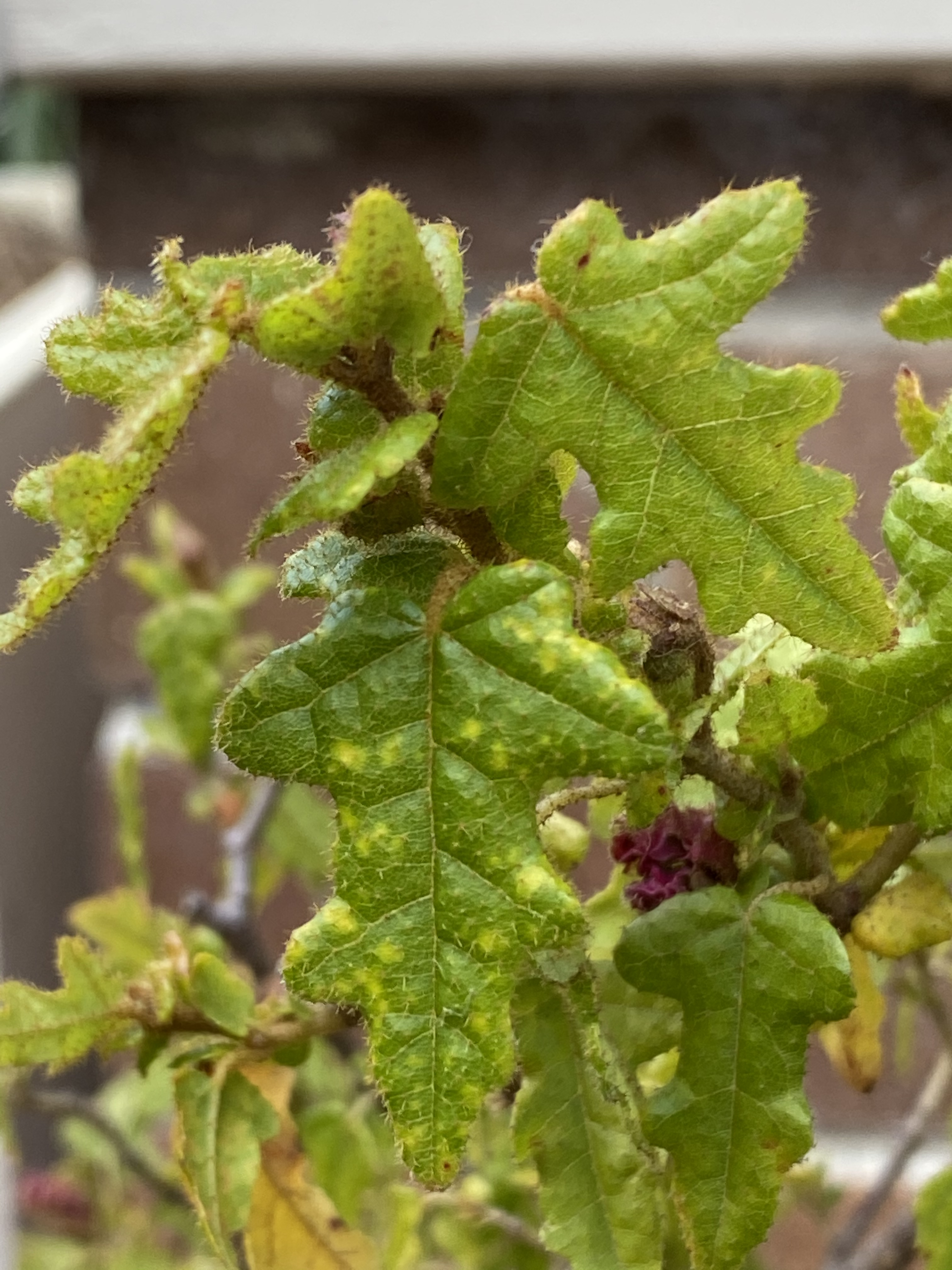
Foliage

Thomasia quercifolia, commonly known as oak leaved thomasia, is a flowering plant in the family Malvaceae and is endemic to the south-west of Western Australia. It has egg-shaped, lobed leaves with a heart-shaped base, and pink to mauve flowers.

== Description ==
Thomasia quercifolia is a densely-branched, low shrub that typically grows to 10–30 cm (3.9–11.8 in) high and 80–100 cm (31–39 in) wide, the stems covered with rust-coloured, star-shaped hairs. The leaves are egg-shaped with a heart-shaped base, 7–30 mm (0.28–1.18 in) long and 10–25 mm (0.39–0.98 in) wide, on a petiole up to 12 mm (0.47 in) long. The leaves usually have 5 lobes, the lobes often further or toothed. Both surfaces of the leaves are covered with star-shaped hairs, more densely so on the lower surface. The flowers are arranged in groups of 2 to 8 on a raceme usually up to 30 mm (1.2 in) long on a hairy peduncle 8–10 mm (0.31–0.39 in) long with hairy, linear bracteoles 3–5 mm (0.12–0.20 in) long at the base of each flower, the flowers 5–8 mm (0.20–0.31 in) in diameter. The sepals are pink to mauve with a few coarse hairs. Flowering occurs from August to December.

== Taxonomy and naming ==
The species was first formally described by botanist Henry Cranke Andrews in The Botanist's Repository for New and Rare Plants in 1806. He gave it the name Lasiopetalum quercifolium Jaques Étienne Gay transferred the species to the genus Thomasia in 1861 as Thomasia quercifolia. The specific epithet (quercifolia) means "oak leaved".

== Distribution and habitat ==
Oak leaved thomasia grows in coastal heath over limestone near the south coast of Western Australia, between the Walpole-Nornalup National Park and Bremer Bay in the Jarrah Forest and Warren bioregions of south-western Western Australia.

== Conservation status ==
Thomasia quercifolia is listed as "Priority Four" by the Government of Western Australia Department of Biodiversity, Conservation and Attractions, meaning that it is rare or near threatened.
