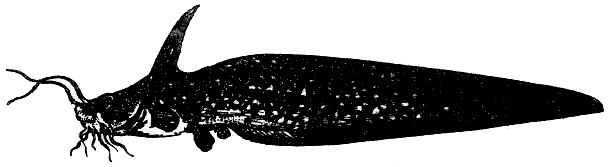
- Euristhmus microceps

Scientific classification
- Kingdom: Animalia
- Phylum: Chordata
- Class: Actinopterygii
- Order: Siluriformes
- Superfamily: Siluroidea
- Family: Plotosidae; Bleeker, 1858

Genera
- Anodontiglanis; Cnidoglanis; Euristhmus; Neosiluroides; Neosilurus; Oloplotosus; Paraplotosus; Plotosus; Porochilus; Tandanus

= Eeltail catfish =

Family of fishes

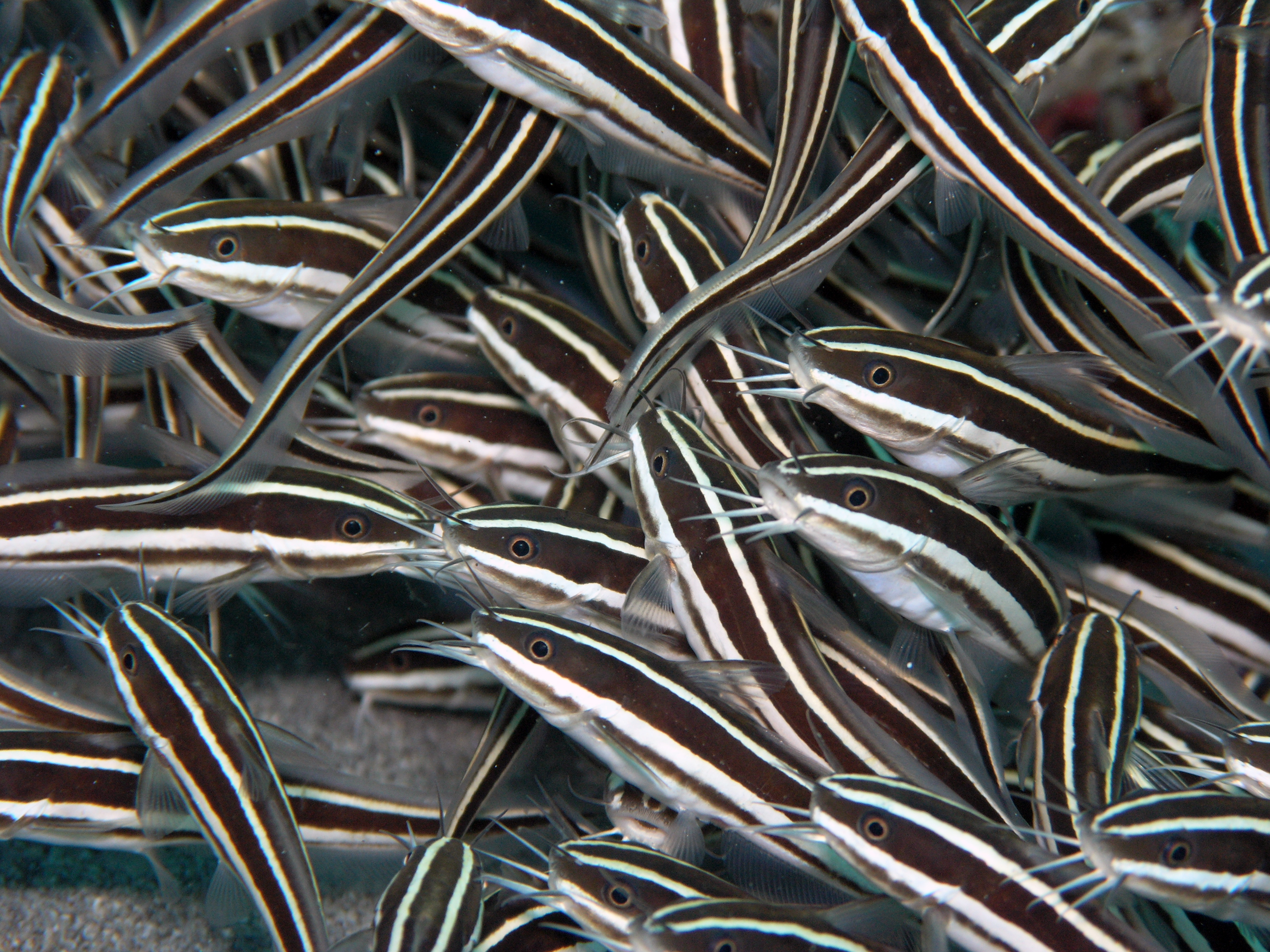
Striped eel catfish, Plotosus lineatus

The eeltail catfish are a family (Plotosidae) of catfish whose tails are elongated in an eel-like fashion. These catfishes are native to the Indian Ocean and western Pacific from Japan to Australia and Fiji. The family includes about 41 species in 10 genera. About half of the species are freshwater, occurring in Australia and New Guinea.

These fish have eel-like bodies. Their tails are pointed or bluntly rounded. Most species have four pairs of barbels. The adipose fin is absent. The tail fin is formed by the joining of the second dorsal fin, the caudal fin, and the anal fin, forming a single, continuous fin.

Some of these catfishes can inflict painful wounds; stings from Plotosus lineatus may cause death, however stings from other types of eeltail catfish causes stinging which usually resides up to two weeks from when the person was penetrated by its dorsal spines. They are bottom feeders and use the barbels around their mouths to detect food.

Unlike most marine teleosts, eeltails have an extra-branchial salt-secreting dendritic organ for osmoregulation. The dendritic organ is likely a product of convergent evolution with other vertebrate salt-secreting organs. The role of this organ was discovered by its high NKA and NKCC activity in response to increasing salinity. However, the Plotosidae dendritic organ may be of limited use under extreme salinity conditions, compared to more typical gill-based ionoregulation.
