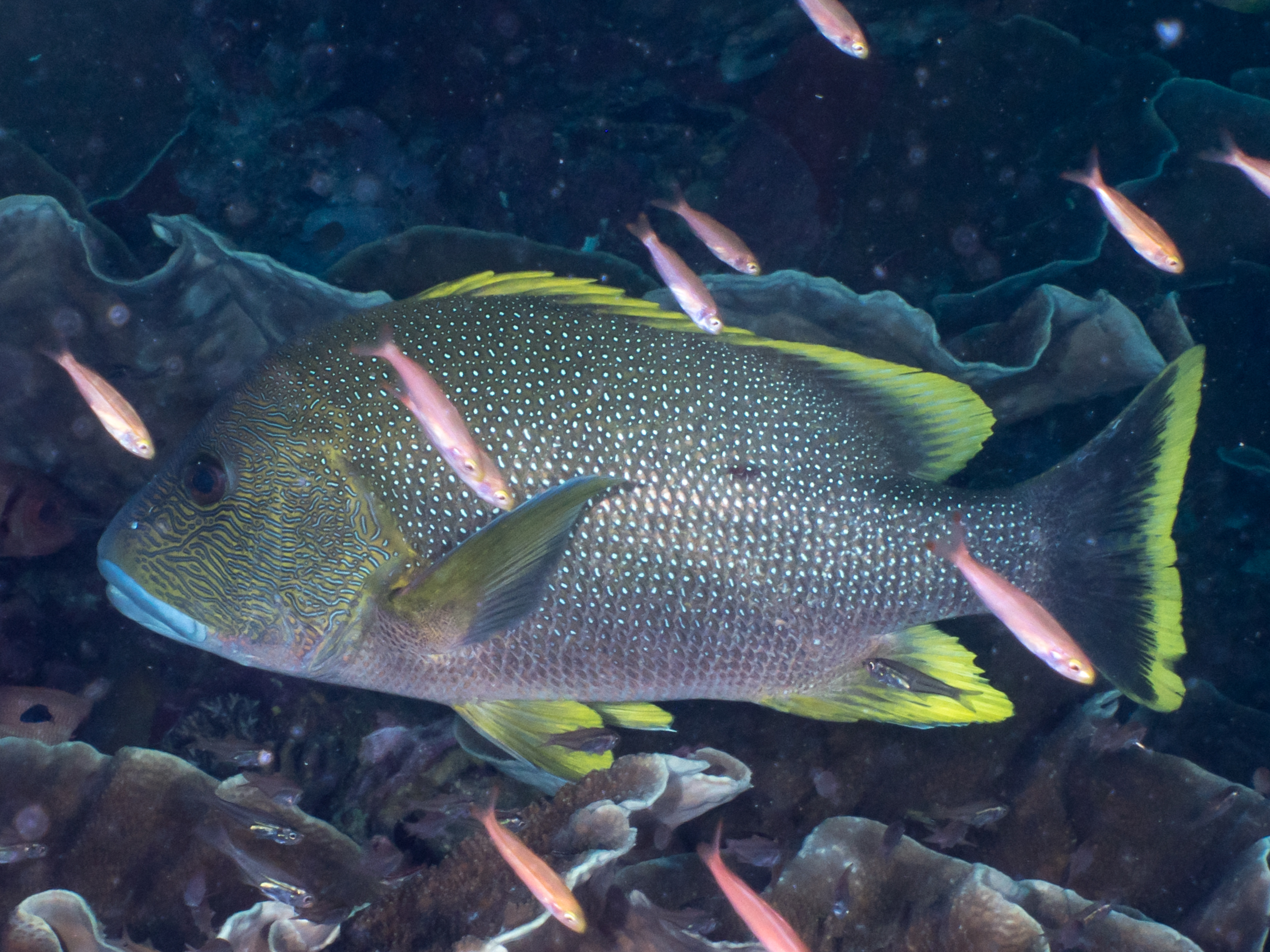

Conservation status
- Least Concern (IUCN 3.1)

Scientific classification
- Kingdom: Animalia
- Phylum: Chordata
- Class: Actinopterygii
- Order: Acanthuriformes
- Family: Lutjanidae
- Genus: Lutjanus
- Species: L. rivulatus

Binomial name
- Lutjanus rivulatus (Cuvier, 1828)

Synonyms
- Diacope rivulata Cuvier, 1828; Diacope caeruleopunctata Cuvier, 1828; Diacope alboguttata Valenciennes, 1831; Mesoprion myriaster Liénard, 1839; Diacope sinal Montrouzier, 1857; Mesoprion quadripunctatus Günther, 1859; Mesoprion parvidens Macleay, 1882

= Lutjanus rivulatus =

Species of fish

Lutjanus rivulatus, the blubberlip snapper, Maori snapper, blue-spotted seaperch, Maori bream, Maori seaperch, multi-coloured snapper, scribbled snapper, speckled snapper or yellowfin snapper, is a species of marine ray-finned fish, a snapper belonging to the family Lutjanidae. It is native to the Indian Ocean and into the Pacific Ocean.

== Taxonomy ==
Lutjanus rivulatus was first formally described in 1828 as Diacope rivulata by the French zoologist Georges Cuvier with the type locality given as Puducherry in India, Java in Indonesia, the Red Sea and Malabar in India. The specific name rivulatus means "marked by irregular streaks" or "scribbled", a reference to the many wavy blue lines on the head.

== Description ==
Lutjanus rivulatus has a very deep body in which the standard length is only just over twice the depth of the body at its deepest. It has a steeply sloped forehead and the knob and incision in the preopercle are moderately developed. The vomerine teeth are arranged in a crescent-shaped patch with no rearwards extension and the smooth tongue lacks teeth. It has thickened lips. The dorsal fin contains 10 spines and 15-16 soft rays and the anal fin has 3 spines and 8 soft rays, the dorsal fin has a rounded rear profile while that of the anal fin is sharply pointed. The pectoral fins contain 17 rays and the caudal fin is either truncate or weakly emarginate. This species attains a maximum total length of 80 cm (31 in), although 60 cm (24 in) is more typical, and the maximum published weight is 11 kg (24 lb). This species has an overall colour of brown with reddish hue and contrasting vivid yellow outer dorsal, anal and caudal fins. There is a pattern of blue lines on the head and finer blue dashes and dots on the body with a blurred dark bar over the base of the pectoral-fin that becomes even less distinct as the fish grows. As well as this bar the juveniles have a white spot on the flanks. Juveniles are also marked with 3-8 dark, vertical bars.

== Distribution and habitat ==
Lutjanus rivulatus has a wide Indo-Pacific range. It occurs from the eastern African coast between the southern Red Sea and South Africa eastwards into the Pacific Ocean as far as Tahiti and the Austral Islands, north to Japan and south to Australia. In Australian waters this species is found from Port Hedland and the offshore reefs in Western Australia, the Ashmore Reef in the Timor Sea and eastwards and southwards to northern New South Wales, it is also found in the Coral Sea and at Christmas Island. It is found at depths between 1.5 and 100 m (4 ft 11 in and 328 ft 1 in) and is associated with reefs, the adults being found on deep, coastal slopes and the juveniles on flats with algal growths, frequently close to freshwater discharges.

== Biology ==
Lutjanus rivulatus may be found as solitary individuals or in small aggregations of 15-20 fishes. Like other snappers this species is predatory, feeding on fishes, cephalopods and benthic crustaceans. sexual maturity is normally attained when the fish are around 50 cm (20 in) in length, although sexually mature individuals have been measured at 37 cm (15 in). They do form aggregations for spawning. This is a wary fish despite its large size.

== Fisheries ==
Lutjanus rivulatus is considered to be an excellent fish for eating, although the consumption of its flesh has been linked to cases of ciguatera. It is an important species for artisanal fisheries throughout its range and is caught using handlines, traps and gillnets, it is infrequently trawled. It is also found in the Hong Kong live fish trade and is grown b in aquaculture in southeastern Asia.
