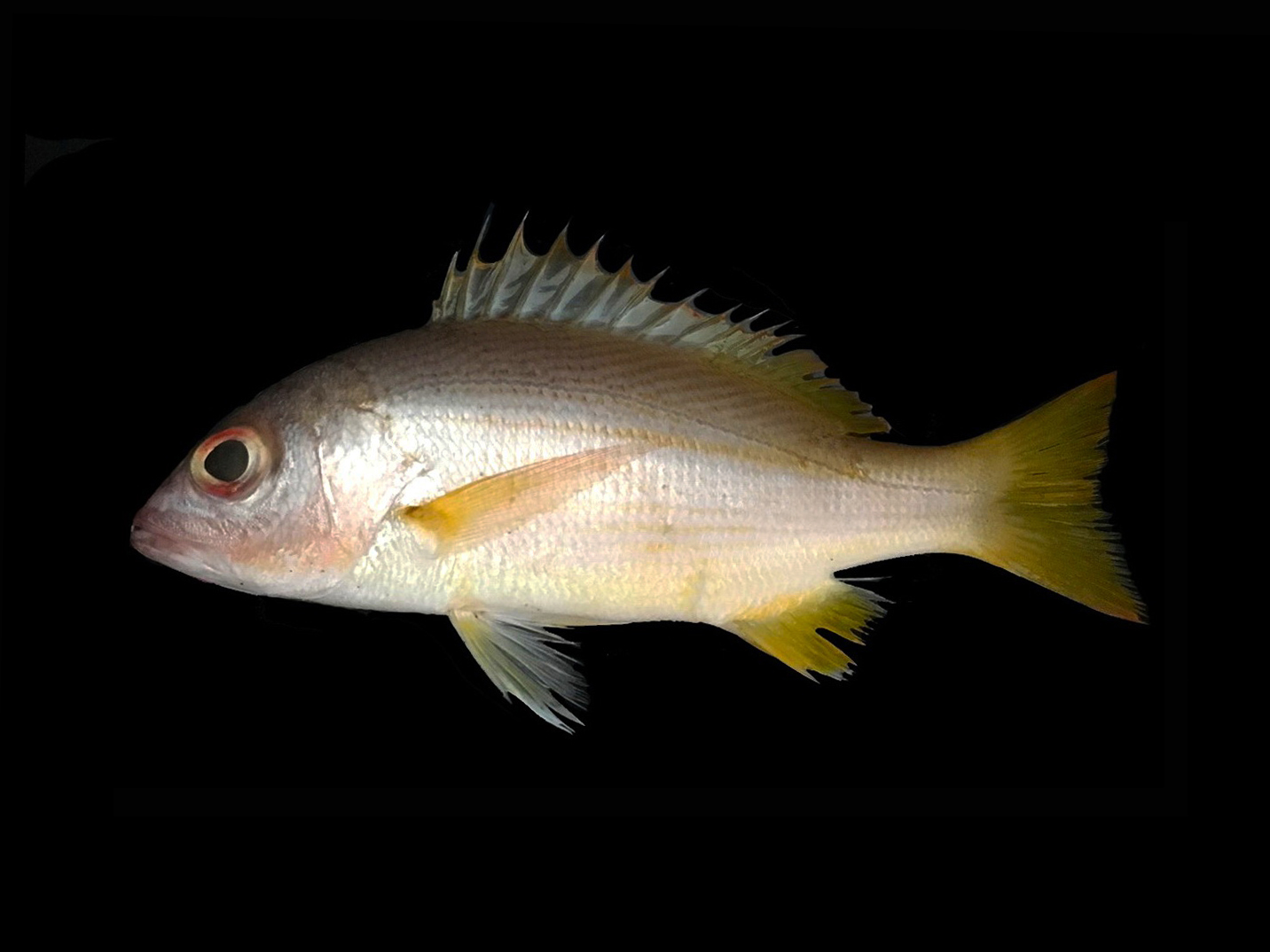

Conservation status
- Least Concern (IUCN 3.1)

Scientific classification
- Kingdom: Animalia
- Phylum: Chordata
- Class: Actinopterygii
- Order: Acanthuriformes
- Family: Lutjanidae
- Genus: Lutjanus
- Species: L. madras

Binomial name
- Lutjanus madras (Valenciennes, 1831)

Synonyms
- Mesoprion madras Valenciennes, 1831

= Lutjanus madras =

Species of fish

Lutjanus madras, the Indian snapper, is a species of marine ray-finned fish, a snapper belonging to the family Lutjanidae. It is native to the western Pacific and Indian Oceans.

== Taxonomy ==
Lutjanus madras was first formally described as Mesoprion madras in 1831 by the French zoologist Achille Valenciennes with the type locality given as Mahé in the Seychelles. The specific name madras is the local name for this fish on Mahé. The yellowfin snapper (Lutjanus xanthopinnis) which was described from Japan in 2013 was thought to account for the Pacific records of L. madras.

== Description ==
Lutjanus madras has a fusiform, slender body which has a standard length that is 2.6 to 3.1 times as long as the body at its deepest point. It has a moderately to gently sloped forehead and the preopercular incision and knob are weakly developed. The vomerine teeth are arranged in a triangular patch with a central rearwards extension, or it is diamond shaped, and the tongue has a patch of grain-like teeth. The dorsal fin has 10-11 spines and 13-14 soft rays while the anal fin contains 3 spines and 8-9 soft rays. The rear of the dorsal fin and the anal fin have an angular profile, the pectoral fins have 16-17 rays and the caudal fin is truncate or weakly emarginate. This fish attains a maximum total length of 30 cm (12 in), although 20 cm (7.9 in) is more typical. The colour of the upper back is brownish, the flanks are whitish marked with a series of very thin yellow longitudinal lines, one on each scale row on the lower half of the body. Above the lateral line there are fine brownish lines running diagonally. The fins, other than the pelvic fins which are whitish or very light yellow, are yellow.

== Distribution and habitat ==
Lutjanus madras was thought to have a distribution restricted to the western Indian Ocean and had been recorded from Zanzibar, the Seychelles, Oman, southern India and Sri Lanka. It was thought that L. xanthopinnis replaced this species in the Pacific Ocean but there is a recent record of L. madras from the Philippines. This species occurs at depths between 5 and 90 m (16 and 295 ft) on coral and rocky reefs.

== Biology ==
Lutjanus madras gathers in small to large aggregations around coral or rocky outcrops. This species is spawns pelagic eggs, forming aggregations for spawning. This is a predatory species which hunts during the day.

== Fisheries ==
Lutjanus madras is a common item in the fish markets of the Andaman and Nicobar Islands where it is caught using handlines. In other areas subsistence fisheries may use gill nets and traps to catch this species.
