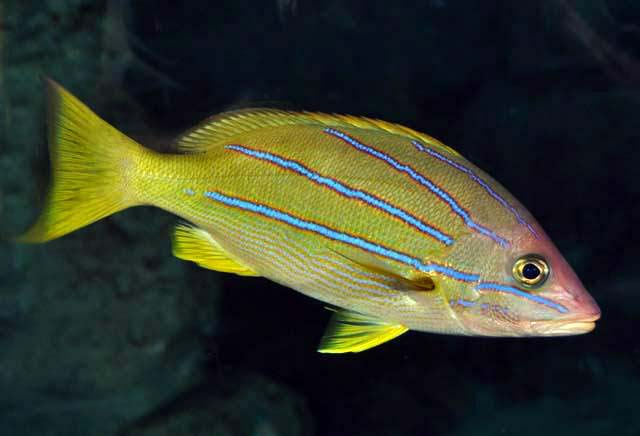
- Blue-and-gold snapper (L. viridis)

Conservation status
- Least Concern (IUCN 3.1)

Scientific classification
- Kingdom: Animalia
- Phylum: Chordata
- Class: Actinopterygii
- Order: Acanthuriformes
- Family: Lutjanidae
- Genus: Lutjanus
- Species: L. viridis

Binomial name
- Lutjanus viridis (Valenciennes, 1846)
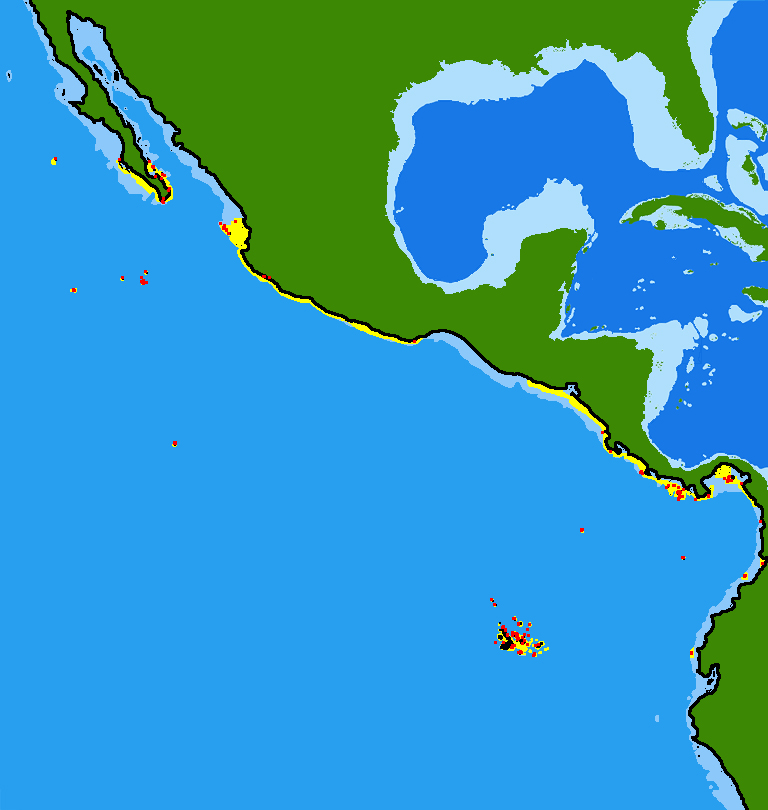

Synonyms
- Diacope viridis Valenciennes, 1846

= Blue and gold snapper =

Species of fish

The blue-and-gold snapper (Lutjanus viridis) is a species of marine ray-finned fish, a snapper belonging to the family Lutjanidae. It is native to the eastern Pacific Ocean where it is important to local subsistence fisheries.

== Taxonomy ==
The blue and gold snapper was first formally described in 1846 as Diacope viridis by the French zoologist Achille Valenciennes with the type locality given as the Galápagos Islands. The specific name viridis means "green", Valenciennes described and illustrated this species with a greenish body marked with darker green stripes along the flanks although it is actually bright yellow with bluish-white, black-edged stripes.

== Description ==
Blue-and-gold snapper has an oblong body. The pointed snout has front and rear nostrils which are simple holes. It has a relatively large mouth which has protractile jaws. The teeth are conical to canine like in shape, with the front teeth typically enlarged so that they resemble fangs. The vomerine teeth are arranged in a V-shape with no rearwards extension and there is a patch of teeth at each side of the palate, but there are no teeth on the tongue. The preoperculum has a weakly developed incision and knob. The dorsal fin is continuous, containing 10 spines and 14-15 soft rays while the anal fin has 3 spines and 8 soft rays, the rear of the dorsal and anal fins may be rounded or pointed. The pectoral fins contain 16-17 rays and the caudal fin is truncate or weakly emarginate. This species attains a maximum total length of 30 cm (12 in). The overall colour of this fish is bright yellow on the body, although this can be dark, with five black-margined blue stripes along the flanks. The abdomen is paler and is marked with many thin orange to yellow lines. They frequently show a reddish face.

== Distribution and habitat ==
The blue and gold snapper is found in the eastern Pacific Ocean where it has a rather discontinuous distribution. It occurs at the mouth of the Gulf of California and southern Baja California, and along the western coast of Mexico, from southern Guatemala to Panama and Colombia. It also occurs at the Revillagigedo Islands of Mexico, Clipperton Island, Cocos Island of Costa Rica, Malpelo Island of Columbia and the Galápagos Islands in Ecuador. It is found where there are rocky substrates and coral reefs at depths down to at least 55 m (180 ft).

== Biology ==
The blue and gold snapper occasionally gathers in large daytime aggregations on rocky or coral reefs. In Panama's Gulf of Chriqui this species is restricted to areas where there are madreporite branching corals. At night this species forages for crabs, molluscs, cephalopods, shrimp, and small fish and they normally seek shelter during the day.

== Fisheries ==
The blue and gold snapper is an important target species for subsistence fisheries, they catch it with hooks and lines. The catch is mostly sold as fresh fish.
