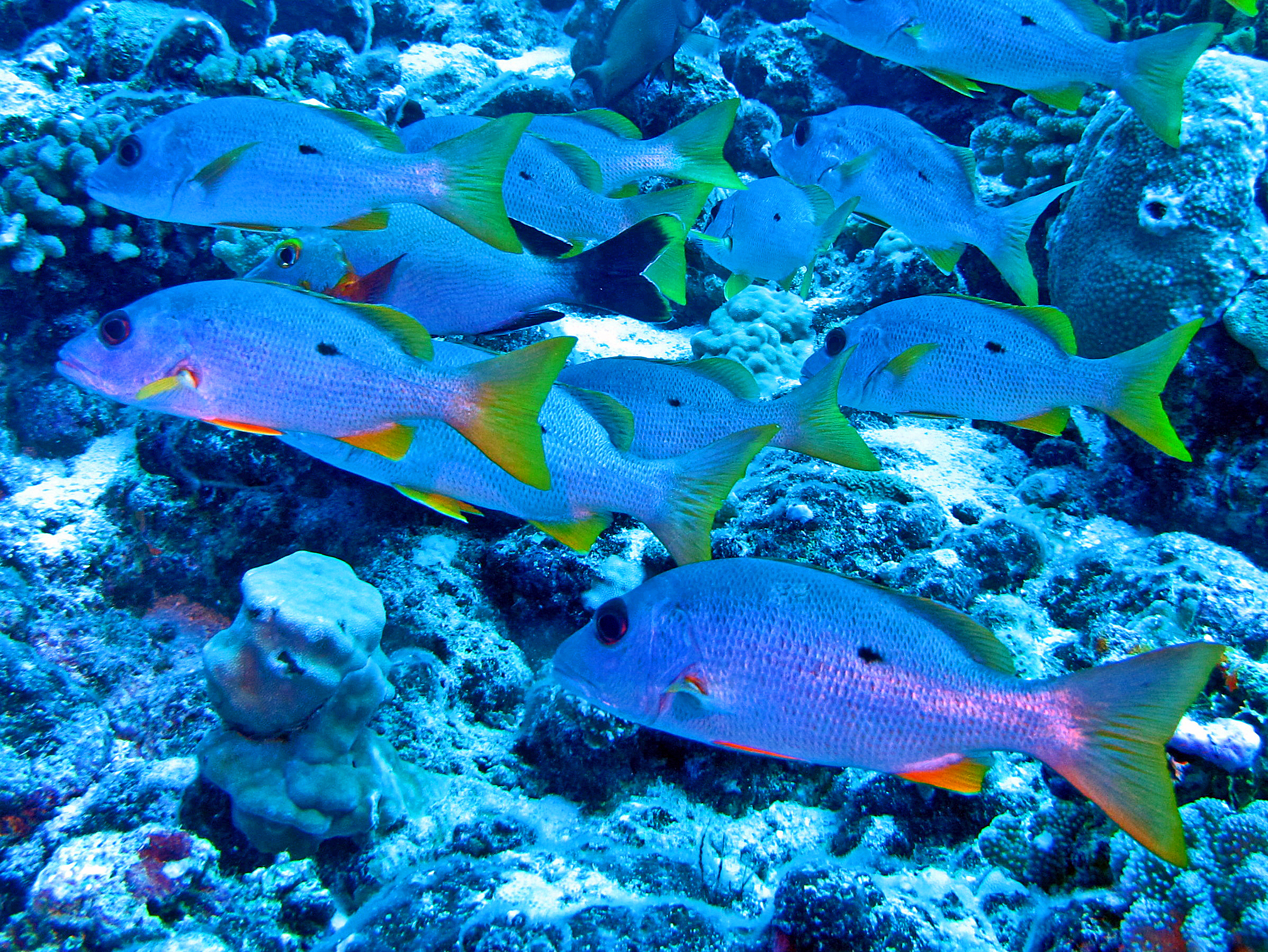
- A group of Lutjanus monostigma from French Polynesia

Conservation status
- Least Concern (IUCN 3.1)

Scientific classification
- Kingdom: Animalia
- Phylum: Chordata
- Class: Actinopterygii
- Order: Acanthuriformes
- Family: Lutjanidae
- Genus: Lutjanus
- Species: L. monostigma

Binomial name
- Lutjanus monostigma (Cuvier, 1828)

Synonyms
- Mesoprion monostigma Cuvier, 1828; Lutjanus lioglossus Bleeker, 1873

= Lutjanus monostigma =

Species of fish

Lutjanus monostigma, the one-spot snapper, onespot seaperch or Moses snapper, is a species of marine ray-finned fish, a snapper belonging to the family Lutjanidae. It is found in the Indo-Pacific region.

== Taxonomy ==
Lutjanus monostigma Was first formally described in 1828 as Mesoprion monostigmaby the French zoologist Georges Cuvier with the type locality given as the Seychelles. The specific name is a compound of mono meaning "one" and stigma meaning "mark", a reference to the black spot located underneath the front dorsal fin rays, a feature obvious in juveniles but which fades in many adults.

== Description ==
Lutjanus monostigmahas a relatively deep body which has a standard length that is 2.6 to 3.0 times as long as the body at its deepest point. It has a gently sloped forehead, and the preopercular incision and knob are weakly developed. The vomerine teeth are arranged in a crescent shaped patch with no central rearwards extension and there are no teeth on the tongue. The dorsal fin has 10 spines and 13-14/soft rays while the anal fin contains 3 spines and 8-9 soft rays. The rear of the dorsal fin and the anal fin are rounded or quite angular. The pectoral fins have 15-17 rays and the caudal fin is truncate or weakly emarginate. This fish attains a maximum total length of 60 cm (24 in), although 50 cm (20 in) is more typical. The overall colour is whitish to pink or grey with yellow fins and there is a black spot or blotch on the posterior of the body. As the fish matures this spot shrinks and becomes more oblong in shape.

== Distribution and habitat ==
Lutjanus monostigma is widespread in the Indo-Pacific from the coast of eastern Africa where it is found from the Red Sea south to Sodwana Bay in South Africa. It is also found in the Persian Gulf and the Indian Ocean islands, south eastern Indian and Sri Lanka and from Southeast Asia east to the Marquesas and Line Islands, north to the Ryukyu Islands of southern Japan and south to Australia. Adults live in coral reef areas, usually close to caves and coral formations, at depths between 1 and 60 meters.

== Biology ==
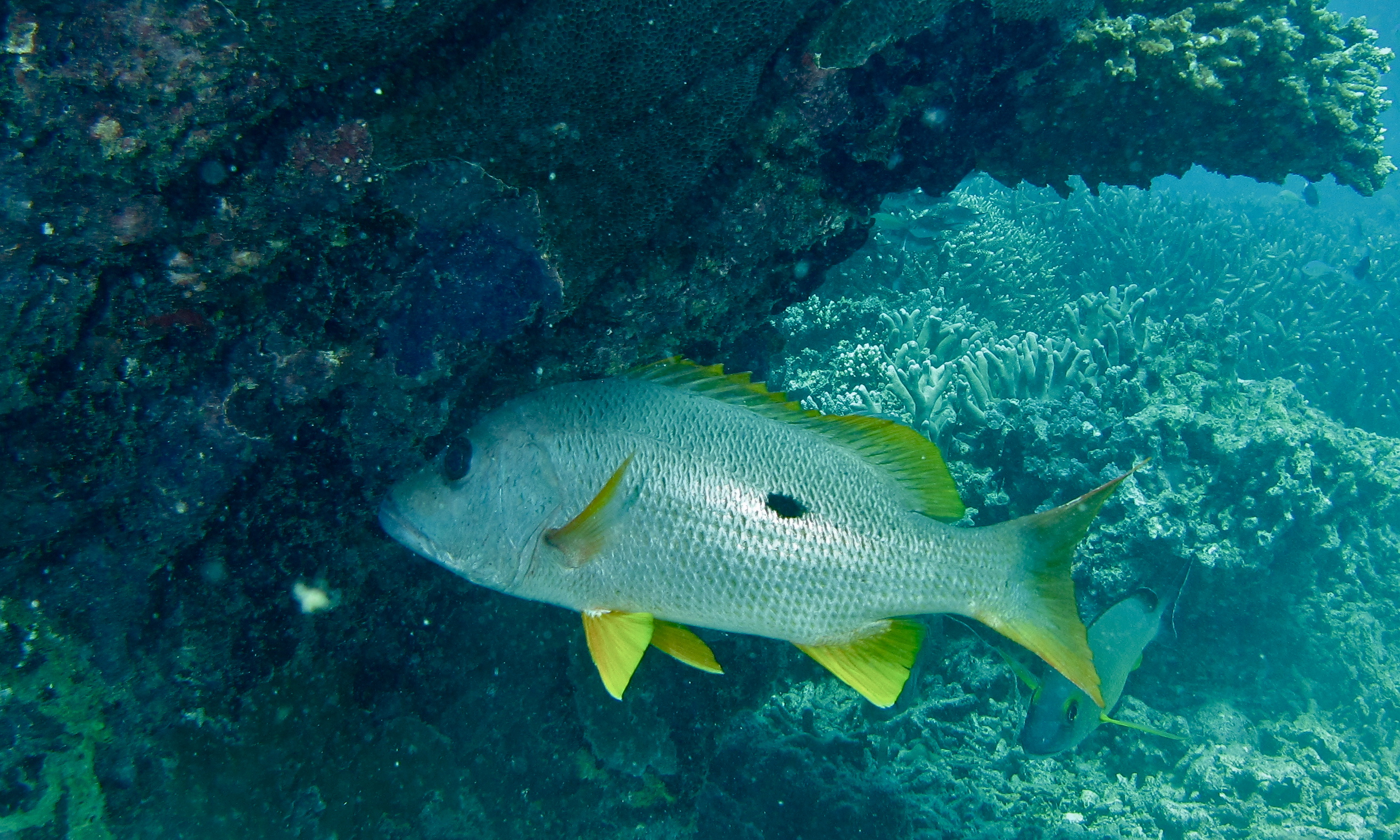
Lutjanus monostigma

Lutjanus monostigma is a nocturnal predator which feeds mainly on fishes, but on benthic crustaceans as well. They are typically solitary, but are sometimes encountered in small schools. Off Papua New Guinea half of the females were estimated to attain sexual maturity at a total length of 32 cm (13 in) and at 3 years of age. This medium sized snapper is estimated to have a maximum lifespan of 13 years.

== Fisheries and conservation ==
Lutjanus monostigma is an important fish for commercial fisheries in many areas where it is found, especially in Oceania. The fish landed are mainly sold as fresh fish and the fishing methods used are mainly handlines, traps and gillnets. This species is known to be ciguatoxic, particularly so in Tuvalu. The onespot snapper is a widespread species and it is thought to occur in many areas where there is low levels of fishing and in these areas it is still numerous, for these reasons the IUCN classify it as Least Concern.

== Bibliography ==
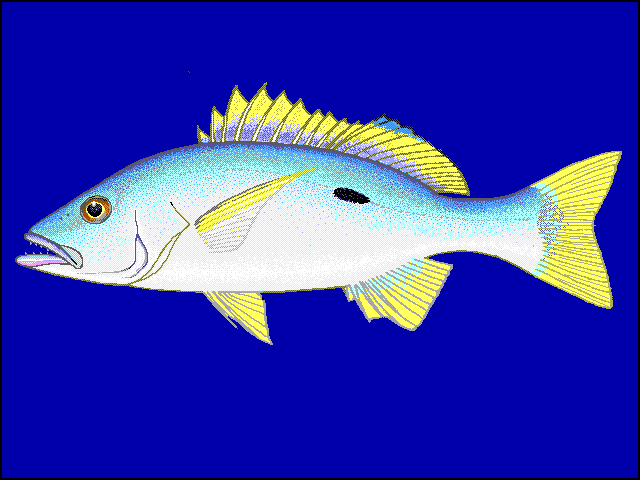
Drawing of the one-spot snapper

- Fenner, Robert M .: The Conscientious Marine Aquarist. Neptune City, New Jersey, USA: TFH Publications, 2001.
- Helfman, G., B. Collette y D. Facey: The diversity of fishes. Blackwell Science, Malden, Massachusetts, USA, 1997.
- Hoese, D.F. 1986. A M. M. Smith y P.C. Heemstra (eds.) Smiths' sea fishes. Springer-Verlag, Berlin, Germany.
- Mauge, L.A. 1986. J. Daget, JP Gosse y D.F.E. Thys van den Audenaerde (eds.) Check-list of the freshwater fishes of Africa (CLOFFA).
- Moyle, P. y J. Cech .: Fishes: An Introduction to Ichthyology, fourth Ed., Upper Saddle River, New Jersey, USA: Prentice-Hall. 2000.
- Nelson, J .: Fishes of the World, 3rd. edición. New York, USA: John Wiley and Sons. 1994.
- Wheeler, A .: The World Encyclopedia of Fishes, the second. Ed., London: Macdonald. 1985.
