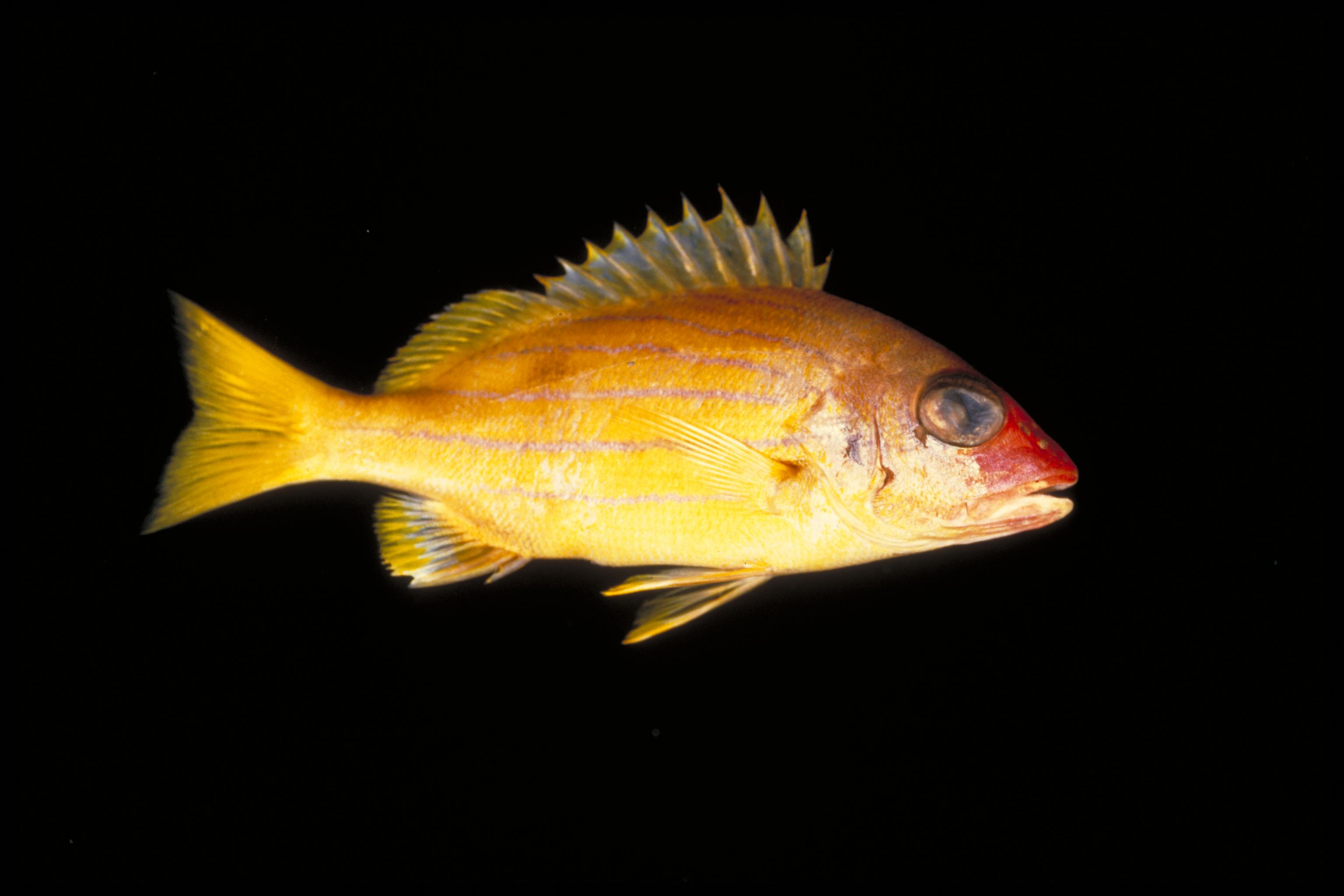
- Lutianus notatus

Conservation status
- Least Concern (IUCN 3.1)

Scientific classification
- Kingdom: Animalia
- Phylum: Chordata
- Class: Actinopterygii
- Order: Acanthuriformes
- Family: Lutjanidae
- Genus: Lutjanus
- Species: L. notatus

Binomial name
- Lutjanus notatus (Cuvier, 1828)

Synonyms
- Diacope notata Cuvier, 1828; Diacope caeruleovittata Valenciennes, 1830; Lutjanus caeruleovittatus (Valenciennes, 1830); Diacope duodecimlineata Valenciennes, 1830; Lutjanus duodecimlineatus (Valenciennes, 1830); Diacope angulus Bennett, 1831; Lutjanus octolineatus Fourmanoir, 1957

= Bluestriped snapper =

Species of fish

The bluestriped snapper (Lutjanus notatus) is a species of marine ray-finned fish, a snapper belonging to the family Lutjanidae. It is found in the southwestern Indian Ocean.

== Taxonomy ==
The bluestriped snapper was first formally described in 1828 by the French zoologist Georges Cuvier with the type locality given as the Indian Ocean. The specific name, notatus, means "marked", a reference to the black spot which is often visible below the dorsal fin.

== Description ==
The bluestriped snapper has a relatively deep body which has a standard length that is 2.5 to 2.7 times as long as the body at its deepest point. It has a steeply sloped forehead, and the preopercular incision and knob are well developed. The vomerine teeth are arranged in a crescent shaped patch with no central rearwards extension and there are no teeth on the tongue. The dorsal fin has 11-12 spines and 12-13 soft rays while the anal fin contains 3 spines and 7-8 soft rays. The rear of the dorsal fin and the anal fin are rounded. The pectoral fins have 15-16 rays and the caudal fin is truncate or weakly emarginate. This fish attains a maximum total length of 25 cm (9.8 in), although 20 cm (7.9 in) is more typical. The head and the part of the back behind the head ate brownish, the flanks are yellow and the abdomen is pale yellowish white. There is a series of 6 thin blue horizontal stripes on the flanks, the highest three sloping upwards towards the base of the dorsal fin. There is a frequently dark spot on the lateral line, similar in size to the pupil, below the front of the soft rayed part of the dorsal fin. The fins are mostly yellow.

== Distribution and habitat ==
The bluestriped snapper is found in the southwestern Indian Ocean. It has been recorded from South Africa, Mozambique, Madagascar, Mauritius and Réunion. It has been recorded from India. The adults are found over coral reefs. They are found at depths between 10 and 50 m (33 and 164 ft).

== Biology ==
The bluestriped snapper is normally a solitary species but it has been known to form small schools of 5-10 individuals. It is a predatory fish which feeds on other fishes and benthic invertebrates.

== Fisheries ==
The bluestriped snapper is fished for by artisanal fisheries wherever it occurs, however, only small quantities are observed in local markets They are taken with handlines, traps and gill nets.
