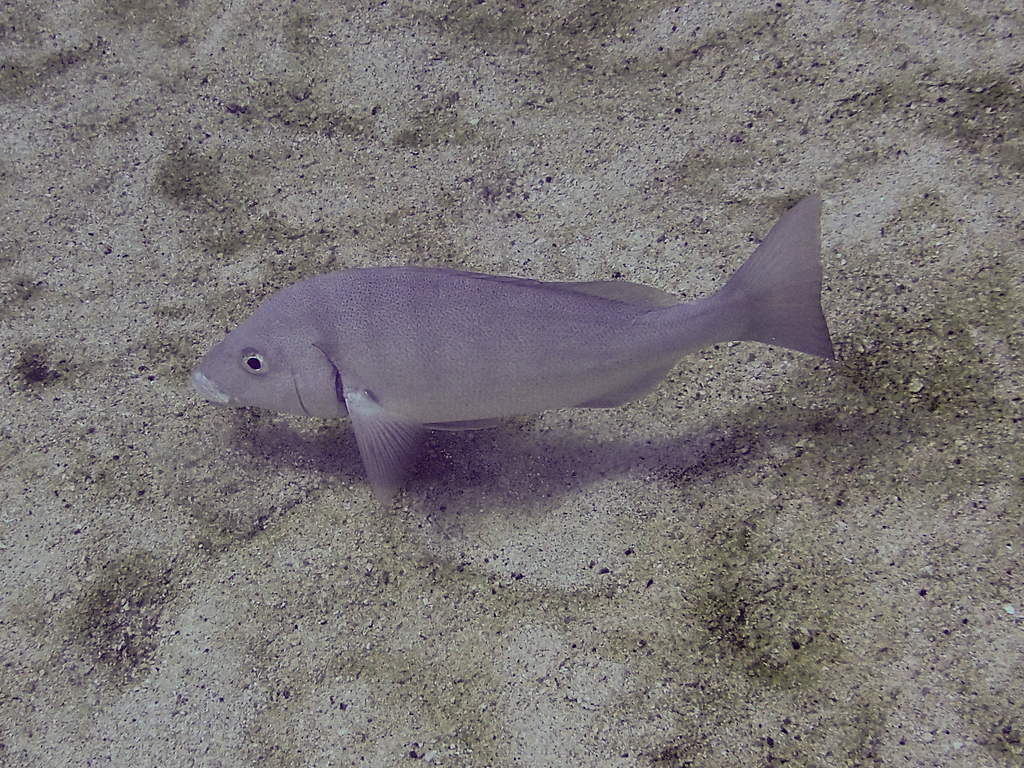

Conservation status
- Least Concern (IUCN 3.1)

Scientific classification
- Kingdom: Animalia
- Phylum: Chordata
- Class: Actinopterygii
- Order: Acanthuriformes
- Family: Lutjanidae
- Genus: Lutjanus
- Species: L. novemfasciatus

Binomial name
- Lutjanus novemfasciatus Gill, 1862

Synonyms
- Mesoprion pacificus Bocourt, 1868; Lutjanus prieto Jordan & Gilbert, 1882; Jordanichthys holei Evermann & Clark, 1928

= Lutjanus novemfasciatus =

Species of fish

Lutjanus novemfasciatus, the Pacific cubera snapper or Pacific dog snapper, is a species of marine ray-finned fish, a snapper belonging to the family Lutjanidae. It is native to the eastern Pacific Ocean.

== Taxonomy ==
Lutjanus novemfasciatus was first formally described in 1862 by the American ichthyologist Theodore Nicholas Gill with the type locality given as Baja California. The specific name novemfasciatus means "nine-banded", a reference to the nine indistinct bands on its flanks.

== Description ==
Lutjanus novemfasciatus has an oblong body which has a depth of 31% to 35% of its standard length. There is a sharp snout with two pairs of nostrils which are simple holes, one pair at the front and another behind that pair. It has a large, protrusible mouth with conical and canine-like teeth on the jaws, the front teeth being enlarged into "fangs". The serrated preoperculum has an incision and a knob but these are only moderately or weakly developed. The vomerine teeth are arranged in a crescent shaped patch with no rearward extension and the tongue has several patches of granular teeth. The fangs at the front of the mouth are longer than the diameter of the pupil. The dorsal fin contains 10 spines and 13-14 soft rays while the anal fin has 3 spines and 8 soft rays, The dorsal fin is continuous with both it and the anal fin having rounded rear ends. The pectoral fins have 16 or 17 rays and the caudal fin may be truncate or weakly emarginate. This is the largest species of snapper, reaching a maximum total length of 170 cm (67 in) and a greatest published weight of 35.7 kg (79 lb). The overall colour varies from dark to pale red, shading to silver on the abdomen. Juveniles and the majority of adults are marked with 8-9 vertical bars on the upper flanks. Even in barred adults the bars may fade quickly after death. The fins are mostly brownish in adults, in juveniles the caudal fin is black and sous the margin of the spiny part of the dorsal fin. The skin on the inside of the mouth is orange.

== Distribution and habitat ==
Lutjanus novemfasciatus is found in the eastern Pacific Ocean where it occurs from southern California to Peru, including the Gulf of California, Galápagos Islands, Cocos Island and Malpelo Island. This is an inshore, reef associated fish which prefers hard substrates, although the juveniles have been recorded entering freshwater.

== Biology ==
Lutjanus novemfasciatus is a nocturnal predator feeding during the night on crustaceans and smaller species of fish which form schools such as croakers, grunts, and wrasses. They shelter in the daylight hours. In Mexico this species is migratory, arriving in inshore waters in early summer, in most years.

== Fisheries ==
Lutjanus novemfasciatus is an important Quarry for subsistence fisheries in Colombia and for commercial fisheries in Nicaragua. It is also a popular target species for spearfishing in the Gulf of California.
