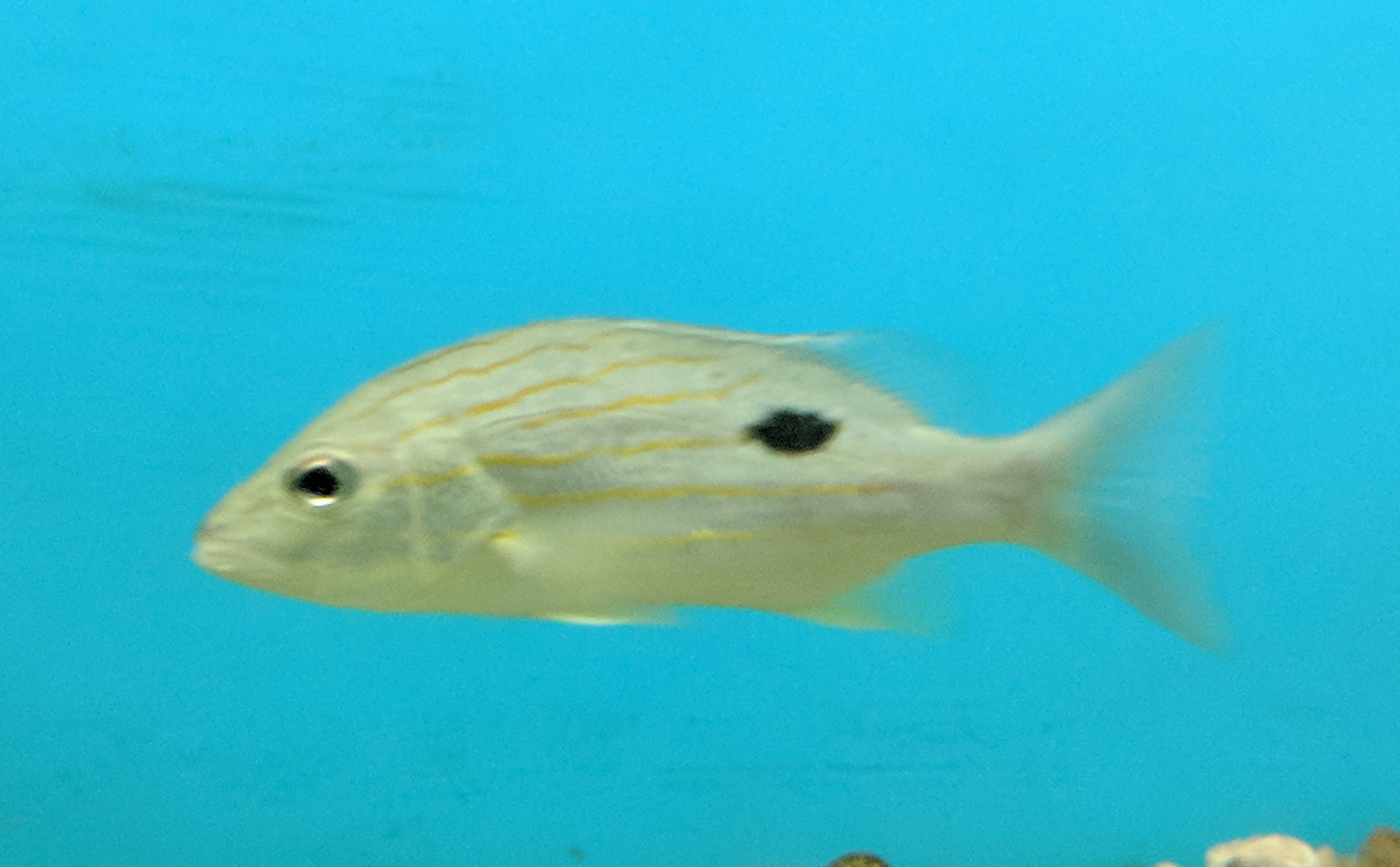

Conservation status
- Least Concern (IUCN 3.1)

Scientific classification
- Kingdom: Animalia
- Phylum: Chordata
- Class: Actinopterygii
- Order: Acanthuriformes
- Family: Lutjanidae
- Genus: Lutjanus
- Species: L. russellii

Binomial name
- Lutjanus russellii (Bleeker, 1849)

Synonyms
- Mesoprion russellii Bleeker, 1849; Lutianus nishikawae Smith & Pope, 1906; Lutianus orientalis Seale, 1910

= Lutjanus russellii =

Species of fish

Lutjanus russellii, Russell's snapper, Moses snapper, fingermark bream, Moses seaperch or Russell's sea-perch, is a species of marine ray-finned fish, a snapper belonging to the family Lutjanidae. It is native to the western Pacific Ocean.

== Taxonomy ==
Lutjanus russellii was first formally described in 1849 as Mesoprion russellii by the Dutch physician, herpetologist and ichthyologist Pieter Bleeker with the type locality given as Jakarta, Java in Indonesia. The specific name honours Patrick Russell the Scottish surgeon and herpetologist who described and depicted, without naming, this species in 1803. Within the genus Lutjanus, L. russellii is closest to the Indian Ocean L. Indicus.

== Description ==
Lutjanus russellii has a moderately deep body to slender, its standard length being 2.6-2.8 times its depth. The forehead can be steep or moderately sloped and the knob and incision on the preopercle are poorly developed. The vomerine teeth are arranged in a triangular patch with a rearwards extension or in a rhombus and there is a patch of tiny teeth on the tongue. The dorsal fin has 10 spines and 14 soft rays and the anal fin has 3 spines and 8 soft rays, the rear of the dorsal and anal fins is rounded, although the anal fin tip can be pointed. The pectoral fins contain 16-17 rays and the caudal fin is either truncate or weakly emarginate. This species attains a maximum total length of 50 cm (20 in), although 30 cm (12 in) is more typical. The overall colour of this fish is whitish to silvery greyish-pink with a brownish back. There is an indistinct black spot, sometimes very indistinct, on the lateral line below the front portion of the dorsal fin. The dorsal and caudal fins have a reddish colour while the other fins are yellow. Juveniles are white in colour with four brown to blackish longitudinal stripes along the flanks, although these may be interrupted, and a horizontally-elongated black spot or ocellus on the lateral line.

== Distribution and habitat ==
Lutjanus russellii is found mainly in the western Pacific Ocean from the Gulf of Thailand and Sumatra east to Tonga, north to southern Japan and south to Australia. In Australian waters this species is found from Shark Bay and the offshore reefs in Western Australia, at Ashmore Reef in the Timor Sea, round the northern and eastern coasts as far south as Wollongong and maybe to Jervis Bay in New South Wales. This species is found at depths between 3 and 80 m (9.8 and 262.5 ft) on offshore coral reefs as well as inshore rocky and coral reefs. The juveniles inhabit mangrove lined estuaries and the lower parts of freshwater streams.

== Biology ==
Lutjanus russellii is a predatory fish which preys on benthic fishes and invertebrates. They reach sexual maturity at 28.1 cm (11.1 in) fork length, when they are about 4 years of age. The average longevity is around 17 years.

== Fisheries ==
Lutjanus russellii is a target species for artisanal fisheries and is frequently sold in fish markets wherever it occurs. Fishers catch it using handlines, traps and bottom trawls. It is also taken live and sold within the Hong Kong live fish trade. This species is also extensively cultured in aquaculture.
