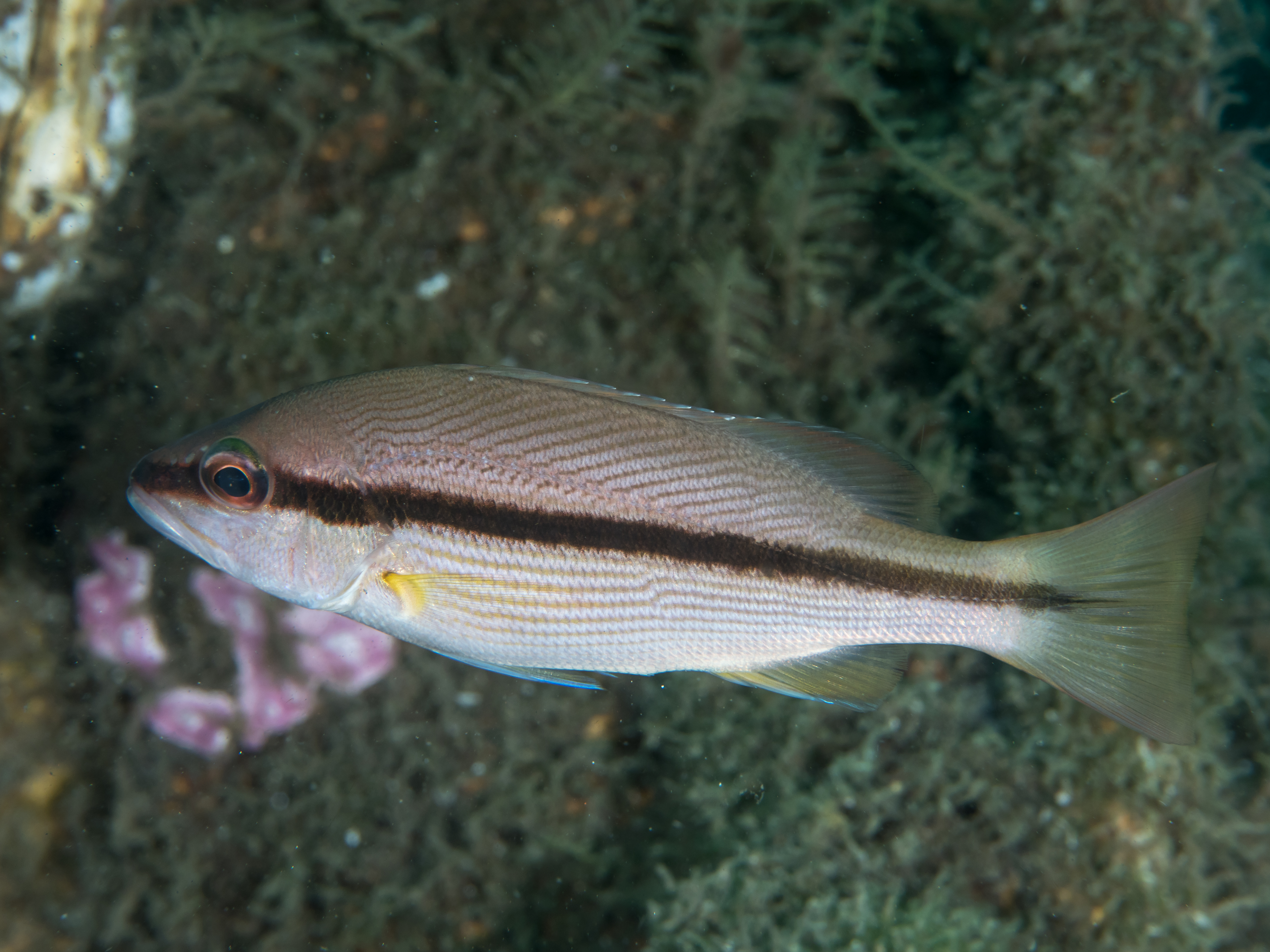
- Lembeh, Indonesia

Conservation status
- Least Concern (IUCN 3.1)

Scientific classification
- Kingdom: Animalia
- Phylum: Chordata
- Class: Actinopterygii
- Division: Teleostei
- Order: Acanthuriformes
- Family: Lutjanidae
- Genus: Lutjanus
- Species: L. vitta

Binomial name
- Lutjanus vitta (Quoy & Gaimard, 1824)

Synonyms
- Serranus vitta Quoy & Gaimard, 1824; Mesoprion enneacanthus Bleeker, 1849; Mesoprion phaiotaeniatus Bleeker, 1849

= Lutjanus vitta =

Species of fish

Lutjanus vitta, the brownstripe red snapper, brownstripe snapper, broadband seaperch, brownstripe seaperch, one-band sea-perch, one-lined snapper or striped seaperch, is a species of marine ray-finned fish, a snapper belonging to the family Lutjanidae. It is native to the western Pacific and Indian Oceans.

== Taxonomy ==
Lutjanus vitta was first formally described in 1824 as Serranus vitta by the French zoologists Jean René Constant Quoy and Joseph Paul Gaimard with the type locality given as the Waigeo in Indonesia. The specific name vitta means "band" or "ribbon", probably a reference to the single longitudinal stripe along the body of this fish.

== Description ==
Lutjanus vitta has a moderately deep body which has a standard length which is 2.6 to 3.0 times its depth with a moderately steeped forehead. The incision and knob on the preoperculum are poorly developed. The vomerine teeth are arranged on a triangular patch with a rearwards extension or as a rhombus and the tongue has a patch of small grain-like teeth. The dorsal fin contains 10 spines and 12-14 soft rays while the anal fin has 3 spines and 8-9 soft rays, the rear tips of the dorsal and anal fins are pointed. The pectoral fins contain 15-16 rays and the caudal fin is truncate or weakly emarginate. This species attains a maximum total length of 40 cm (16 in), although 35 cm (14 in) is more typical. The overall colour is whitish to pinkish, there is a yellowish-brown to black stripe running along the middle of the flanks. There are very thin oblique stripes above the lateral line and slender longitudinal brown stripes below it. The back and median fins are yellow. The juveniles and subadults have a wider, blacker stripe than the adults.

== Distribution and habitat ==
Lutjanus vitta has a wide Indo-Pacific distribution from the Seychelles and Socotra in the west, the Maldives, southern India and Sri Lanka in the Indian Ocean. In the western Pacific it is found from Thailand and Indonesia east to New Caledonia, the Gilbert Islands, the Marshall Islands and south to Australia extending north to southern Taiwan. It occurs at depths between 10 and 72 m (33 and 236 ft). In Australia it is found from the Houtman Abrolhos islands in Western Australia around the tropical northern coast to Moreton Bay in Queensland, as well as at Ashmore Reef in the Timor Sea. It is found on coral reefs as well as in places where there are low coral outcrops, sponges, and sea whips.

== Biology ==
Lutjanus vitta may be encountered singly or in schools of as many as around 30 fishes. It is a predatory species which has a diet comprising fishes, shrimps, crabs and other benthic invertebrates. Spawning occurs throughout the year off New Caledonia, peaking in spring and summer. This species forms spawning aggregations.

== Fisheries ==
Lutjanus vitta is targeted by fisheries throughout its range, it is a common species in fish markets. The catch is normally sold fresh. It is typically caught using handlines, traps and bottom trawls.
