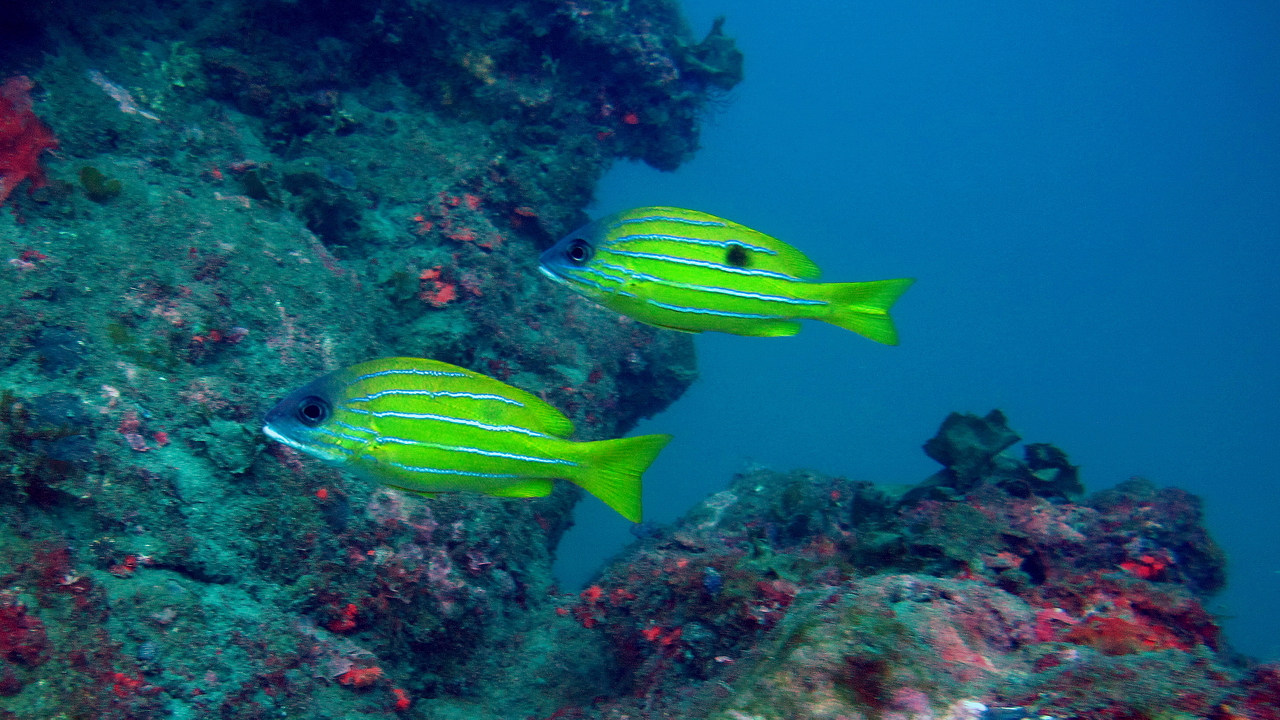

Conservation status
- Least Concern (IUCN 3.1)

Scientific classification
- Kingdom: Animalia
- Phylum: Chordata
- Class: Actinopterygii
- Order: Acanthuriformes
- Family: Lutjanidae
- Genus: Lutjanus
- Species: L. quinquelineatus

Binomial name
- Lutjanus quinquelineatus (Bloch, 1790)

Synonyms
- Holocentrus quinquelineatus Bloch, 1790; Grammistes quinquevittatus Bloch & J. G. Schneider, 1801; Diacope decemlineata Valenciennes, 1830; Diacope spilura E. T. Bennett, 1833; Lutjanus spilurus (E. T. Bennett, 1833); Genyoroge grammica F. Day, 1871; Genyoroge notata sublineata De Vis, 1884; Genyoroge notata sexlineatus Saville-Kent, 1893

= Lutjanus quinquelineatus =

Species of fish

Lutjanus quinquelineatus, the five-lined snapper, blue-striped snapper, blue-banded sea-perch, five-lined seaperch or gold-striped sea-perch, is a species of ray-finned fish, a snapper belonging to the family Lutjanidae. It is native to the Indian Ocean and the western Pacific Ocean.

== Taxonomy ==
Lutjanus quinquelineatus was first formally described in 1790 as Holocentrus quinquelineatus by the German physician and zoologist Marcus Elieser Bloch with the type locality given as Japan. The specific name quinquelineatus means "five lined", a reference to the five blue lines on the flanks.

== Description ==
Lutjanus quinquelineatus has a moderately deep body, its standard length being 2.3 to 2.9 times its depth. It has a steeply sloped forehead and a clear, well developed preopecular incision and knob. The vomerine teeth are arranged in a crescent shaped patch, with no rearwards extension; and no there are no teeth on the smooth tongue. The dorsal fin contains 10 spines and 13-15 soft rays while the anal fin has 3 spines and 8-9 soft rays, The dorsal and anal fins have rounded to somewhat angular rear profiles. The pectoral fins contain 16 or 17 rays and the caudal fin is either truncate or weakly emarginate. This species attains a maximum total length of 38 cm (15 in), although 30 cm (12 in) is more typical. The upper part of the head is brownish but the overall colour of this snapper is yellow marked with 5 vivid blue horizontal stripes on flanks. There is typically a black blotch or spot on the upper posterior part of the body.

== Distribution and habitat ==
Lutjanus quinquelineatus has an Indo-Pacific range. It is found in the Persian Gulf and the Gulf of Oman, Sri Lanka and southern India in the Indian Ocean and from the Andaman Sea east to Fiji, Tonga Tahiti and the Caroline Islands in the Pacific Ocean, north to Japan and south to Australia. In Australian waters this species is distributed from the central coast of Western Australia along the tropical northern coast and south on the eastern coast as far as central New South Wales. The five-lined snapper occurs in protected lagoons and the exposed, outer slopes of coral reefs at depths between 2 and 40 m (6 ft 7 in and 131 ft 3 in). The juveniles are found in sheltered bays with substrates of rubble and algae.

== Biology ==
Lutjanus quinquelineatus had been recorded forming sizeable schools in some Pacific locations and they are commonly encountered in large aggregations at depths of 30 to 40 m (98 to 131 ft) which may be in excess of 100 individuals. It is a predatory species which has a diet dominated by fishes and crustaceans. Off New Caledonia, spawning takes place over much of the year, peaking in November to January.

== Fisheries ==
Lutjanus quinquelineatus is considered to be a good quality food fish and is important to artisanal fisheries, in parts of its range. They are caught using handlines, traps and gillnets. This species is sold as fresh fish in much of its range. The five-lined snapper is a valued quarry to recreational fishers in Queensland and is also found in the aquarium trade.
