= Lutjanus lemniscatus =

Conservation status
- Least Concern (IUCN 3.1)

Scientific classification
- Kingdom: Animalia
- Phylum: Chordata
- Class: Actinopterygii
- Order: Acanthuriformes
- Family: Lutjanidae
- Genus: Lutjanus
- Species: L. lemniscatus

Binomial name
- Lutjanus lemniscatus (Valenciennes, 1828)

Synonyms
- Serranus lemniscatus Valenciennes, 1828; Mesoprion immaculatus Cuvier, 1828; Mesoprion janthinuropterus Bleeker, 1853; Lutianus janthinuropterus (Bleeker, 1853); Lutjanus janthinuropterus (Bleeker, 1853); Lutjanus melanotaenia Bleeker, 1863; Lutianus furvicaudatus Fowler, 1904

Species of fish

Lutjanus lemniscatus, the yellowstreaked snapper, darktail snapper, darktail seaperch or maroon sea-perch is a species of marine ray-finned fish, a snapper belonging to the family Lutjanidae. It is native to the western Pacific and Indian Oceans.

== Taxonomy ==
Lutjanus lemniscatus was first formally described in 1828 as Serranus lemniscatus by the French zoologist Achille Valenciennes with the type locality given as Sri Lanka. The specific name lemniscatus means decorated with ribbons, a reference to the horizontal banded pattern of juveniles.

== Description ==
Lutjanus lemniscatus has a moderately deep body which has a standard length which is 2.5 to 2.8 times its depth at its deepest point. The forehead is steeply sloped and the snout has a slightly concave profile. The knob and notch on the preoperculum are weakly developed. The vomerine teeth are arranged in a crescent shape with no rearwards extension and the tongue has a patch of granular teeth. The dorsal fin has 10 spines and 13–14 soft rays while the anal fin contains 3 spines and 8 soft rays. The rear of the dorsal fin and the anal fin are rounded, the pectoral fins have 16 rays and the caudal fin is truncate or weakly emarginate. This fish attains a maximum total length of 60 cm (24 in), although 35 cm (14 in) is more typical. The typical overall colour may be greyish or pinkish-brown or olive-green or silvery with sooty brown to blackish dorsal and caudal fins, frequently showing a thin white margin. The juveniles are light grey with a wide black mid-lateral stripe sandwiched by two thin white stripes extending from the tip of the snout to the base of the caudal fin. Specimens of adult fish living in deeper waters are frequently reddish in colour.

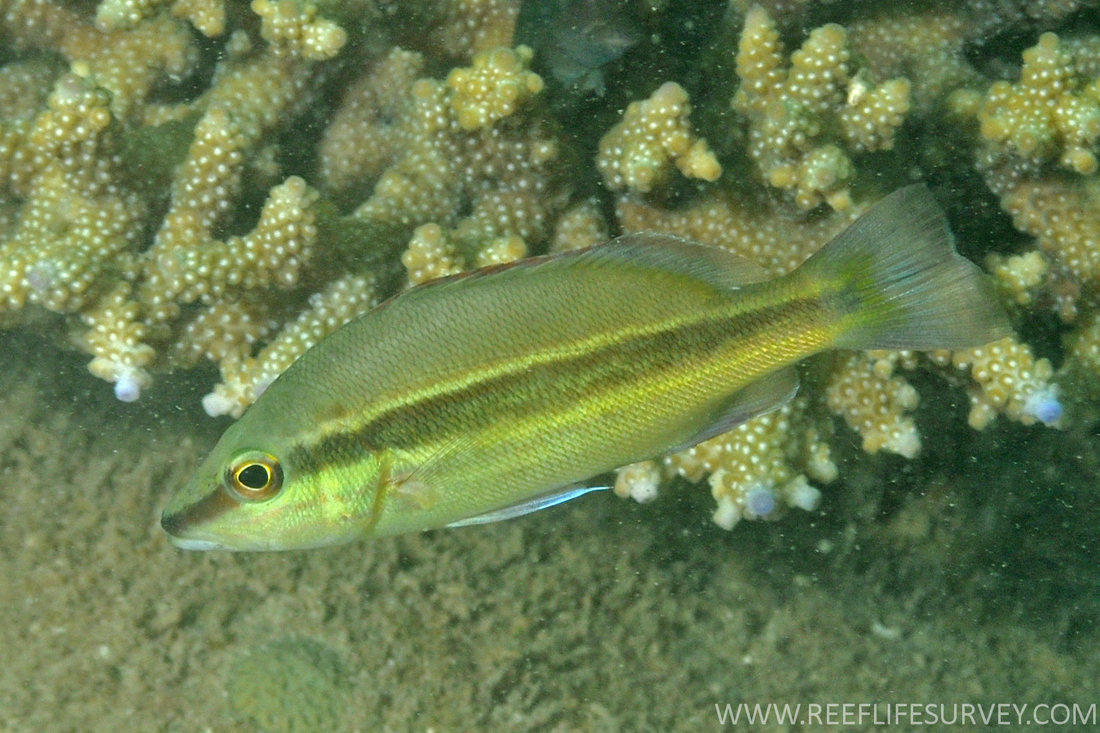
Juvenile

== Distribution and habitat ==
Lutjanus lemniscatus has an Indo-West Pacific distribution which extends from southern India and Sri Lanka east to Papua New Guinea. It is also definitely been recorded from Bangladesh, Cambodia, Indonesia and Malaysia. Reports from Pakistan and Mozambique need confirmation. In Australia its range extends from Shark Bay in Western Australia to Cooktown in Queensland, and May reach as far as South on the east coast as Noosa. This species occurs at depths between 0 to 110 m (0 to 361 ft). The adults are found offshore on reefs and in muddy habitats. The juveniles are occasionally recorded in the vicinity of coral reefs, frequently situated near the shore with moderate silting and poor visibility. The adults are normally found in very deep water.

== Biology ==
Lutjanus lemniscatus are found either singly or in small groups. It is a predatory species which feeds on fishes and benthic invertebrates.

== Fisheries ==
Lutjanus lemniscatus is caught using handlines, traps and sometimes bottom trawls. It is targeted by artisanal fisheries in India's Gulf of Mannar and is taken in some general snapper fisheries, for example in Indonesia, but separate data is not collected.
