= Golden African snapper =

Conservation status
- Least Concern (IUCN 3.1)

Scientific classification
- Kingdom: Animalia
- Phylum: Chordata
- Class: Actinopterygii
- Order: Acanthuriformes
- Family: Lutjanidae
- Genus: Lutjanus
- Species: L. fulgens

Binomial name
- Lutjanus fulgens (Valenciennes, 1830)

Synonyms
- Mesoprion fulgens Valenciennes, 1830; Lutjanus maltzani Steindachner, 1881

Species of fish

The golden African snapper (Lutjanus fulgens) is a species of marine ray-finned fish, a snapper belonging to the family Lutjanidae. It is native to the eastern Atlantic Ocean.

== Taxonomy ==
The golden African snapper was first formally described in 1830 by the French zoologist Achille Valenciennes with the type locality given as Gorée in Senegal. The specific name fulgens means "bright" or "brilliant", a reference to the vivid colour of lower body as well as the shining background colour shining with its 15-56 horizontal golden-yellow stripes.

== Description ==
The golden African snapper has a moderately slender body with a short snouted, blunt head with very large eyes. The mouth extends back to below the centre of the eye. The vomerine teeth are arranged in a triangular patch which has an obvious posterior extension. The incision and the knob on the preoperculum are not well developed. The dorsal fin has 10 spines and 13-14 soft rays while the anal fin contains 3 spines and 8 soft rays. The pectoral fins are relatively short and do not extend as far as the anus and the caudal fin is emarginate. This fish attains a maximum total length of 60 cm (24 in), although 50 cm (20 in) is more typical. The colour of the back and upper flanks is bright pink and silvery white on lower flanks and abdomen, along the flanks there are a number of longitudinal golden stripes, one on each scale row.

== Distribution and habitat ==
The golden African snapper is found in the eastern Atlantic Ocean. It ranges along the west coast of Africa from Senegal to Nigeria and then from the Gulf of Guinea south to Angola. It has been reported from Cape Verde and the islands in the Gulf of Guinea.This demersal species occurs at depths between 5 and 150 m (16 and 492 ft), the adults over rock substrates.

== Biology ==
The golden African snapper is a predatory species, feeding on other fishes and crustaceans.

== Fisheries ==
The golden African snapper is targeted by subsistence and commercial fisheries, it is fished for primarily using trawl, hook and line and spearfishing. In Ghana it is one of the important fish species utilised in the coastal zone. It is mainly sold fresh.
