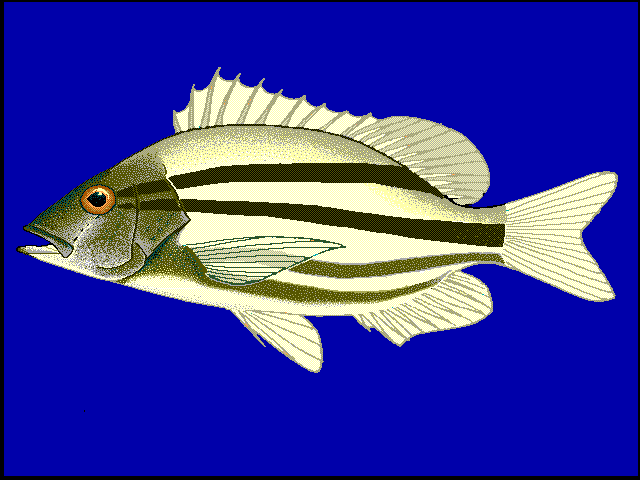

Scientific classification
- Kingdom: Animalia
- Phylum: Chordata
- Class: Actinopterygii
- Order: Acanthuriformes
- Family: Lutjanidae
- Genus: Lutjanus
- Species: L. maxweberi

Binomial name
- Lutjanus maxweberi Popta, 1921

Synonyms
- Lutjanus palmeri Fowler, 1931

= Pygmy snapper =

Species of fish

The pygmy snapper (Lutjanus maxweberi) is a species of ray-finned fish, a snapper belonging to the family Lutjanidae. It is found in the western Pacific Ocean and is only known from fresh and brackish waters.

== Taxonomy ==
The pygmy snapper was first formally described in 1921 by the Dutch ichthyologist Canna Maria Louise Popta with the type locality given as Muna Island off Sulawesi. Popta used the generic name Lutianus and spelt the specific name max weberi, these are now regarded as misspellings. The specific name honours the Dutch ichthyologist Max Weber who led the Siboga expedition on which the type was collected.

== Description ==
The pygmy snapper has a relatively deep body which has a standard length that is 2.2 to 2.7 times as long as the body at its deepest point. It has a steeply sloped forehead, and the preopercular incision and knob are weakly developed. The vomerine teeth are arranged in a crescent shaped or triangular patch with no central rearwards extension and there are no teeth on the tongue. The dorsal fin has 10 spines and 13 soft rays while the anal fin contains 3 spines and 8 soft rays. The rear of the dorsal fin and the anal fin are rounded or weakly angular. The pectoral fins have 16 rays and the caudal fin is emarginate. The overall colour of the body of juveniles is whitish marked with 4 sooty brown to blackish longitudinal stripes on the flanks. The adults are plain brownish on the back and flanks with whitish underparts. The maximum known standard length is 15 cm (5.9 in).

== Distribution and habitat ==
The pygmy snapper is found in the western Pacific Ocean where it has been recorded from the Philippines, Sulawesi and New Guinea. It occurs as juveniles in mangrove lined inlets, brackish waters and freshwater streams, the habitat of adults is unknown.

== Biology ==
The pygmy snapper has a poorly known biology. It has been recorded in small groups.
