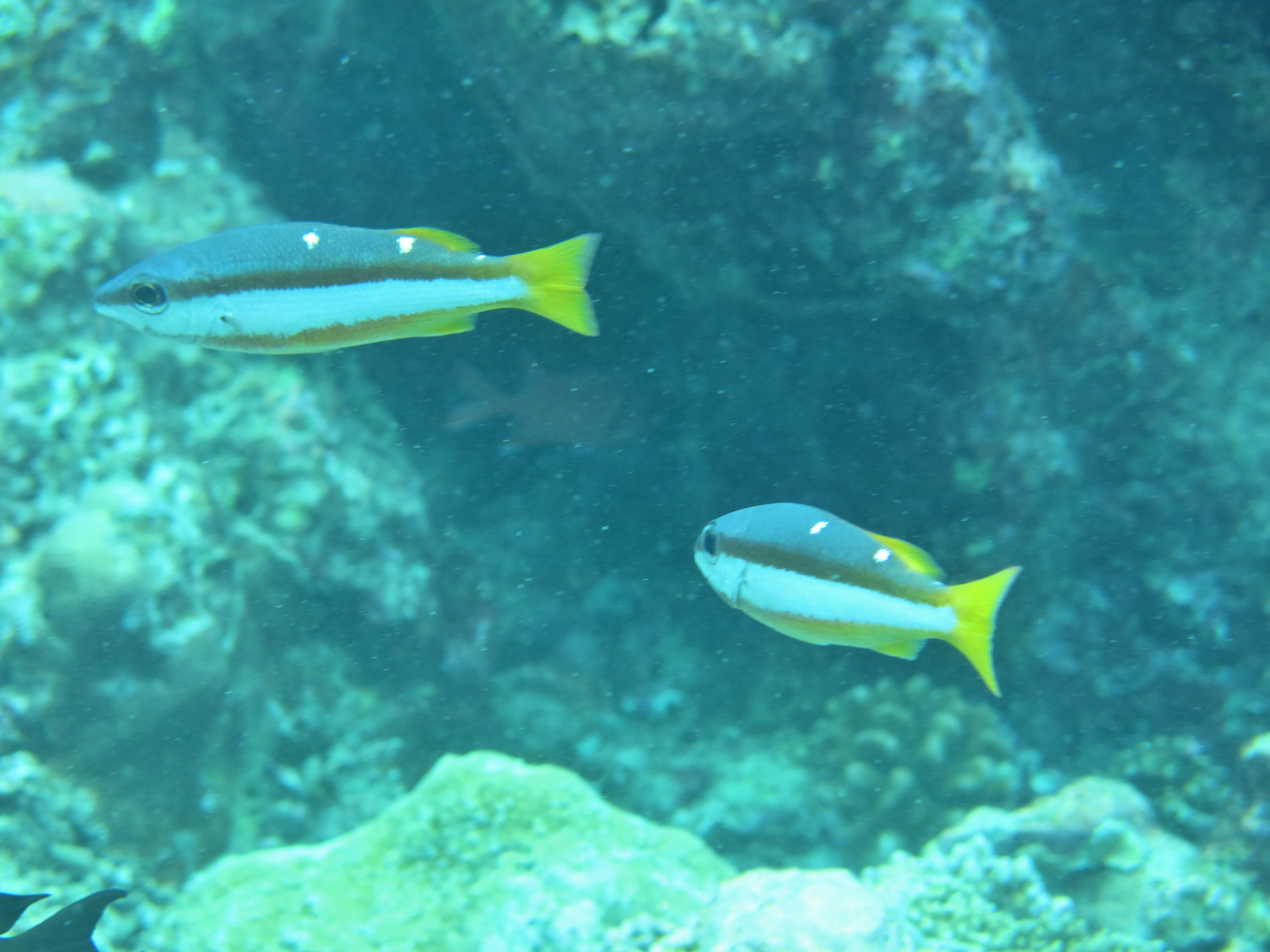

Conservation status
- Least Concern (IUCN 3.1)

Scientific classification
- Kingdom: Animalia
- Phylum: Chordata
- Class: Actinopterygii
- Order: Acanthuriformes
- Family: Lutjanidae
- Genus: Lutjanus
- Species: L. biguttatus

Binomial name
- Lutjanus biguttatus (Valenciennes, 1830)

Synonyms
- Serranus biguttatus Valenciennes, 1830; Lutianus biguttatus (Valenciennes, 1830); Mesoprion elongatus Hombron & Jacquinot, 1853; Mesoprion bleekeri Günther, 1859

= Lutjanus biguttatus =

Species of fish

Lutjanus biguttatus, the two-spot banded snapper or two-spot snapper, is a species of marine ray-finned fish, a snapper belonging to the family Lutjanidae. It is native to the western Pacific and eastern Indian Oceans.

== Taxonomy ==
Lutjanus biguttatus was first formally described as Serranus biguttatus in 1830 by the French zoologist Achille Valenciennes with the type locality given as Trincomalee in Sri Lanka and Ambon Island in Indonesia. The specific name biguttatus means "two spotted" a reference to the two spots on the back underneath the dorsal fin.

== Description ==
Lutjanus biguttatus has a very slender, fusiform body with a snout which has a low, gently sloping profile. The preoperculum's knob and incision are weak. In the mouth the vomerine teeth are arranged in a triangular patch, with a posterior extension, or in a rhombus shape and there are no teeth on the tongue. The caudal fin is truncate. The dorsal fin contains 11 spines and 12 soft rays while the anal fin contains 3 spines and 8 soft rays. This species has a greyish back, a wide horizontal white stripe running from the mouth to the caudal peduncle bordered on both sides by two reddish-brown stripes. There are two white spots on the back underneath the base of the dorsal fin. The juveniles are largely white with a grey back, a dark brown longitudinal stripe along the lateral line and two indistinct white spots on the back. The maximum standard length recorded for this species is 25 cm (9.8 in) although 15 cm (5.9 in) is more typical.

== Distribution and habitat ==
Lutjanus biguttatus is found in the Indo-Pacific region. It is distributed from the Maldives and Sri Lanka through the Andaman Sea and the Malay Archipelago east as far as the Solomon Islands, north as far as the Philippines and south to Australia, although there are records from farther east in Samoa, Fiji and the Caroline Islands. In Australia it has been recorded in Western Australia from Hibernia Reef to the Scott Reef, the Ashmore Reef in the Coral Sea and off the Cape York Peninsula in northern Queensland. It is found at depths between 3 and 30 m (9.8 and 98.4 ft) on coral reefs.

== Biology ==
Lutjanus biguttatum is an uncommon species but will gather in aggregations of over 100 individuals, although they are frequently encountered as solitary fish. It is a predatory species which feeds largely on smaller fishes and crustaceans.

== Fisheries ==
Lutjanus biguttatus is an important food fish in some areas, such as Sri Lanka, although it is uncommon in fish markers where it is sold fresh. It is caught using traps, hand lines and gill nets.
