= Lutjanus mizenkoi =

Scientific classification
- Kingdom: Animalia
- Phylum: Chordata
- Class: Actinopterygii
- Division: Teleostei
- Order: Acanthuriformes
- Family: Lutjanidae
- Genus: Lutjanus
- Species: L. mizenkoi

Binomial name
- Lutjanus mizenkoi G. R. Allen & Talbot, 1985

Species of fish

This is the second specimen collected weighing 282g, now in the collection of Western Australian Museum as a paratype of the species.

Lutjanus mizenkoi, the Samoan snapper, is a species of marine ray-finned fish, a snapper belonging to the family Lutjanidae.

== Etymology ==
The fish is named in honor of David Mizenko, of the Graduate School of Oceanography, at the University of Rhode Island, because of his efforts in procuring the type specimens and bringing them to the authors' attention that it may represent an undescribed species. Mizenko wrote his master's thesis on snappers of Samoa and incidentally purchased the holotype specimen at a Samoan fish market.

Mr. Mizenko’s thesis on Samoan reef slope snapper populations focused three snapper species purchased from fishermen during 1982 at the market (Maketi Fou) in Apia, Samoa. He conducted his research in the laboratory of the Fisheries Division of Samoa. On occasion he would find a specimen similar in appearance to one of his subject fish, Lutjanus rufolineatus, but consistently different in traits.

As Mr. Mizenko related in November 2026:

- I came across the first specimen of what became known as Lutjanus mizenkoi on July 10, 1982. I noticed it because it felt flaccid when handled compared to the rigid body of Lutjanus rufolineatus, to which it appears similar in size and coloration. I set that fish aside, as well as four additional specimens I found, the last on November 18, 1982.

Compared to the commonly caught L. rufolineatus, L. mizenkoi differed in being lighter in color along the top of the dorsal fin, and having a shallower propercular notch, a more elongate body shape, a posterior extension to the vomerine (mouth roof) tooth patch, and a white, versus a black, peritoneum. Based on interviews with fishermen, all five were caught in the Apolima Strait between Savaii and Upolu Islands in deeper water, about 100 to 150 meters, whereas L. rufolineatus was more widely distributed, also apearing at shallower depths and in other fishing areas.

Mr. Mizenko wrote to Dr. Allen requesting help with identifying a Lutjanus sp. fish enclosing a photo of the specimen collected on August 22, 1982 (photo also shown in this article). Mr. Mizenko sent the specimen to Dr. Allen separately.

When returning to the United States, Mr. Mizenko visited icthyologist Jack Randall at the Bishop Museum in Honolulu, Hawaii bringing photos and a preserved specimen with him (the one whose photo accompanies this article). Dr. Randall suggested he reach out to Gerald Allen of the Western Australian Museum who was conducting a systematic review of Lutjanus spp. fishes of the Indo-Pacific. He did so sending Dr. Allen a photo and, separately, a preserved specimen (letter Mizenko to Allen dated January 20, 1983).

Dr. Allen's letter acknowledging receipt of additional photos and specimens, expressing confidence that they represent an undescribed species of Lutjanus.

In the course of correspondance, Mr. Mizenko provided additional photographs and specimens to Dr. Allen (letter Allen to Mizenko dated December 21, 1983) who determined, after extensive research and evaluation, the specimens to be an undescribed species.
