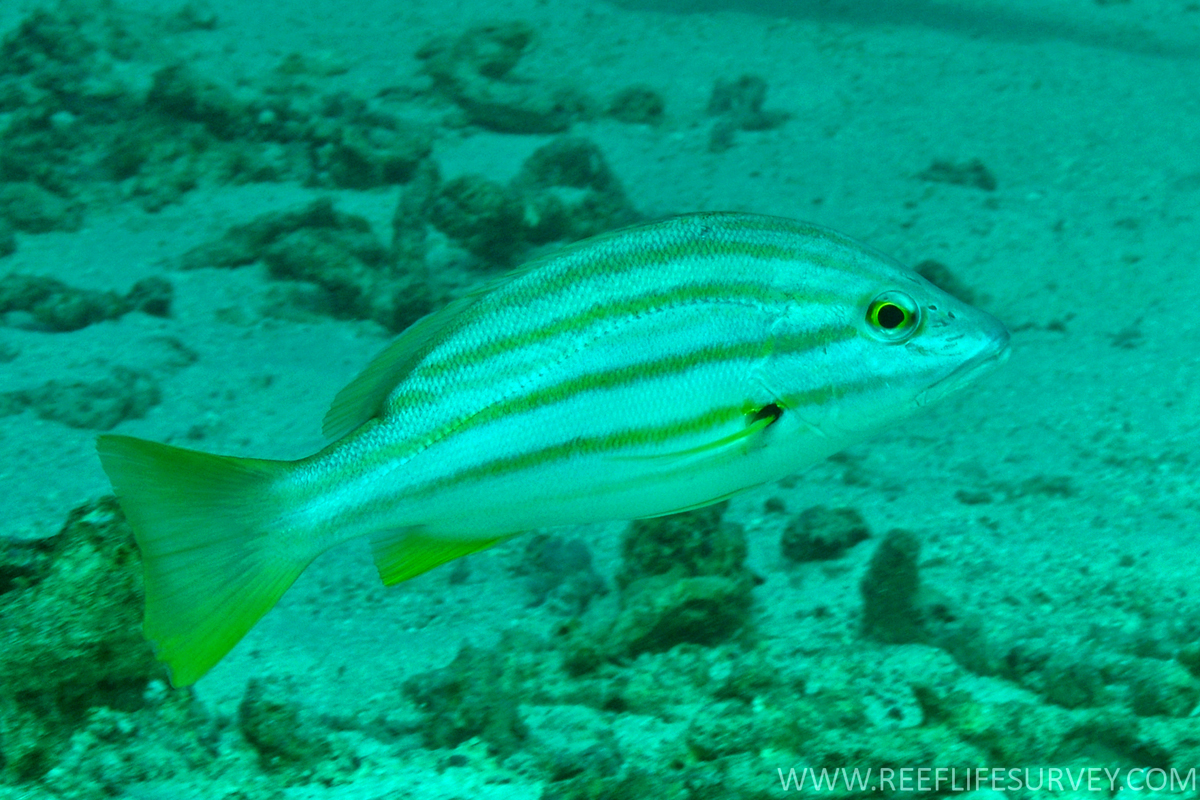

Conservation status
- Least Concern (IUCN 3.1)

Scientific classification
- Kingdom: Animalia
- Phylum: Chordata
- Class: Actinopterygii
- Order: Acanthuriformes
- Family: Lutjanidae
- Genus: Lutjanus
- Species: L. carponotatus

Binomial name
- Lutjanus carponotatus (Richardson, 1842)

Synonyms
- Mesoprion carponotatus Richardson, 1842; Mesoprion chrysotaenia Bleeker, 1851; Lutianus chrysotaenia (Bleeker, 1851); Lutjanus chrysotaenia (Bleeker, 1851); Mesoprion naborer Montrouzier, 1857

= Lutjanus carponotatus =

Species of fish

Lutjanus carponotatus, the Spanish flag snapper, stripey snapper, dusky-striped sea-perch, gold-banded sea perch, gold-stripe sea-perch, striped seaperch or stripey seaperch, is a species marine ray-finned fish, a snapper belonging to the family Lutjanidae. It is native to the western Pacific and Indian Oceans, from India to northern Australia.

== Taxonomy ==
Lutjanus carponotatus was first formally described in 1842 as Mesoprion carponotatusby the Scottish naval surgeon, naturalist and arctic explorer Sir John Richardson with the type locality given as Port Essington in the Northern Territory of Australia. The specific name is a compound of karpos which means "wrist"and notatus meaning "marked" a reference to the blackish spot at the base of the highest rays and upper axil of the pectoral fins.

== Description ==
Lutjanus carponotatus has a moderately deep body which has a depth of around 2.5 times its standard length. The snout is rather pointed, with a steep dorsal profile. The knob and incision on the preoperculum are weakly developed. The vomerine teeth may be arranged in a triangular patch with a posterior extension or in a rhombus shaped patch and there is a small patch of grain like teeth on the tongue. The dorsal fin contains 10 spines and 14-16 soft rays while the anal fin has 3 spines and 9 soft rays. The rear part of the dorsal fin and the anal fin are rounded in shape, the pectoral fin has 15 to 17 rays and the caudal fin is emarginate. The scale rows on the back rise diagonally from the lateral line. The maximum total length recorded for this species is 40 cm (16 in) although 30 cm (12 in) is more typical. This species overall colour is bluish-grey to whitish and it is marked with 8-9 yellow to golden-brown horizontal stripes along the flanks, they have yellow fins and there is a blackish spot on the axil and the base of the uppermost rays of the pectoral fin. The juveniles have a wide white longitudinal stripe running from the snout to the base of the caudal fin, above and below this whitish stripe there are alternating dark brown to black stripes.

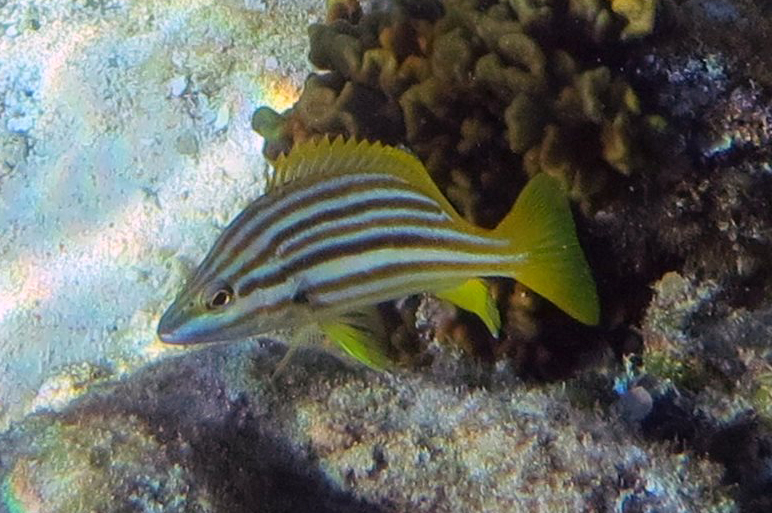
A juvenile in the lagoon at Lady Elliot Island, Queensland

== Distribution and habitat ==
Lutjanus carponotatus has a distribution in the Indo-West Pacific. Their range extends from the Andaman Sea coast and Bay of Bengal in western India east to Papua New Guinea north to the coasts of the South China Sea and south to northern Australia. In Australia it is found from Shark Bay in Western Australia east to Moreton Bay in Queensland, possibly reaching south as far as northern New South Wales, it also occurs on reefs in the Coral Sea. They are found at depths between 2 and 80 m (6 ft 7 in and 262 ft 6 in), although they are rarely recorded below 15 m (49 ft). The adults are found in coral reefs, both in sheltered lagoons and on the outer slopes, often found in turbid coastal waters. The juveniles are found in the back reef near the shore where there are tabular and corymb-like Acropora corals with a sandy substrate.

== Biology ==
Lutjanus carponotatus is frequently encountered in schools of 20-30 fishes. This species has a pelagic larval stage which lasts for 3–4 weeks before the larva settles. As adults they are sedentary, remaining mainly within a small home range. They then grow quickly for their first 3–4 years and females reach sexual maturity at 2 years old and a fork length of around 19 cm (7.5 in). They have a lifespan of 18–20 years. The Spanish flag snapper is an active predator, using ambush tactics to catch smaller fishes and crustaceans, although they are somewhat opportunistic and have been recorded consuming juvenile sea turtles. The number of eggs the female can lay increases with their size, as does the size of the eggs, and the larger females can lay over 700,000 eggs at a time.

== Fisheries ==
Lutjanus carponotatus is an important species for artisanal, recreational and commercial fisheries throughout its range. It is caught mostly with handlines or rod and reel (Australia), traps and gill nets. It is targeted by recreational fishers in Western Australia. It is also caught by trawlers. In Australia the catch of this species makes up less than 10% of the fish landed by the commercial line fishery on the Great Barrier Reef. In the Philippines and Indonesia it is a commercially targeted species but landing statistics are unavailable. This fish is normally sold fresh at market.
