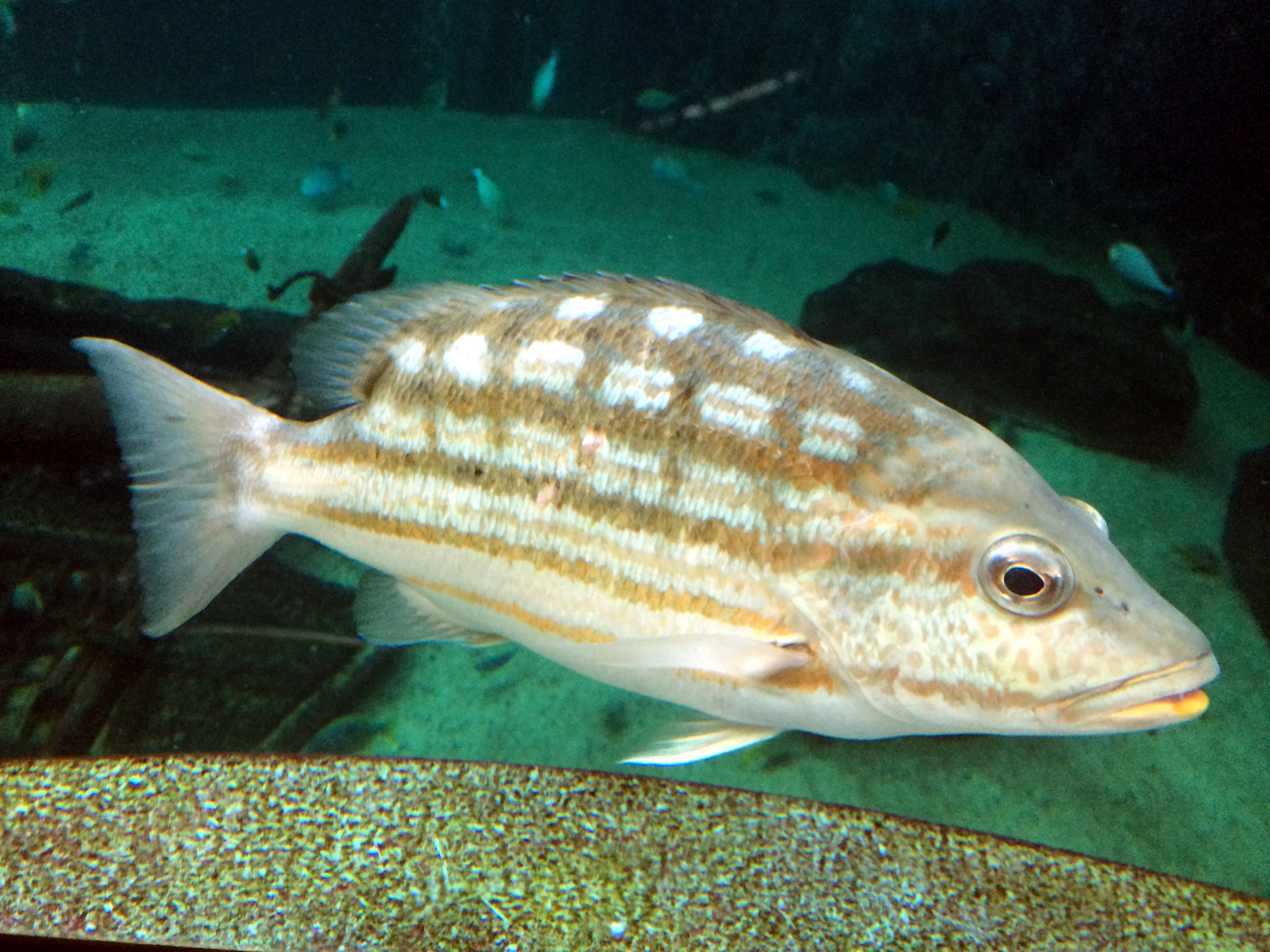

Conservation status
- Least Concern (IUCN 3.1)

Scientific classification
- Kingdom: Animalia
- Phylum: Chordata
- Class: Actinopterygii
- Order: Acanthuriformes
- Family: Lutjanidae
- Genus: Lutjanus
- Species: L. decussatus

Binomial name
- Lutjanus decussatus (Cuvier, 1828)

Synonyms
- Mesoprion decussatus Cuvier, 1828; Mesoprion therapon Day, 1870

= Lutjanus decussatus =

Species of fish

Lutjanus decussatus, the checkered snapper, checkered seaperch or cross-hatched snapper, is a species marine ray-finned fish belonging to the family Lutjanidae. It is native to the western Pacific and Indian Oceans.

== Taxonomy ==
Lutjanus decussatus was first formally described as Mesoprion decussatus in 1828 by the French zoologist Georges Cuvier with the type locality given as Java in Indonesia. The specific name decussatus means "divided crosswise in the form of an X", a reference to the checkered pattern on the body of this species made by five horizontal red bands crossed by seven vertical brown bands.

== Description ==
Lutjanus decussatus has a moderately deep body with a depth which is between a quarter and a third of its standard length with a moderately sloped upper profile to the head. The preoperculum has a weak knob and notch. The vomerine teeth are arranged in a crescent-shaped patch with no rearwards extension and there is a patch grain-like teeth on its tongue. The dorsal fin has 10 spines and 13-14 soft rays while the anal fin contains 3 spines and 8-9 soft rays. The rear part of the dorsal fin and the anal fin have a rounded shape. The maximum total length recorded for this species is 35 cm (14 in) although 25 cm (9.8 in) is more typical. This species has an overall colour of whitish to pale greyish brown to reddish-brown stripes and bars creating a checkered pattern on the upper flanks, and they have a large black spot on the base of the caudal fin. They have pale coloured fins and a red submarginal stripe on the caudal fin.

== Distribution and habitat ==
Lutjanus decussatus is found in the Indo-West Pacific region. Its range extends from Sri Lanka and eastern India east to Micronesia, north to the Ryukyu Islands of southern Japan and south to Australia. In Australia this species is found at the Dampier Archipelago and the offshore reefs of northern Western Australia, at the Ashmore Reef in the Timor Sea, and the northern Great Barrier Reef off Queensland. It is found in relatively shallow water, varying in depth from 2 to 30 m (6 ft 7 in to 98 ft 5 in) on coastal reef faces and sandy slopes where there are scattered patches of reef, they also less commonly occur on offshore reefs. Juveniles are found on sheltered reef flats.

== Biology ==
Lutjanus decussatus adults may be solitary or live in small schools. They feed on fishes and crustaceans. Off Okinawa this species spawned during June and October, the spawning events being determined by lunar cycles.

== Fisheries ==
Lutjanus decussatus is taken by subsistence fisheries which catch it with handlines, traps and gill nets, it is not very important to commercial fisheries, although it is taken by these fisheries in some parts of its range such as the Ryukyu Islands.. Small numbers sometimes appear in the aquarium trade.
