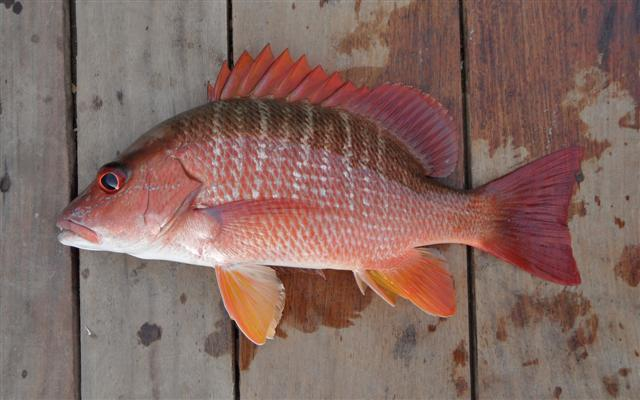

Conservation status
- Data Deficient (IUCN 3.1)

Scientific classification
- Kingdom: Animalia
- Phylum: Chordata
- Class: Actinopterygii
- Order: Acanthuriformes
- Family: Lutjanidae
- Genus: Lutjanus
- Species: L. goreensis

Binomial name
- Lutjanus goreensis (Valenciennes, 1830)

Synonyms
- Mesoprion goreensis Valenciennes, 1830; Lutjanus guineensis Bleeker, 1863

= Gorean snapper =

Species of fish

The Gorean snapper (Lutjanus goreensis) is a species of marine ray-finned fish, a snapper belonging to the family Lutjanidae. It is found in the eastern Atlantic Ocean.

== Taxonomy ==
The Gorean snapper was first formally described in 1830 as Mesoprion goreensis by the French zoologist Achille Valenciennes with the type locality given as Gorée in Senegal. The specific name refers to the type locality of Gorée.

== Description ==
The Gorean snapper has a relatively deep body with a pointed snout and a steeply sloping forehead. The vomerine teeth are arranged in a triangular patch with a clearly rearwards extension. The dorsal fin has 10 spines and 14 soft rays while the anal fin has 3 spines and 8 soft rays. The pectoral fins contain 16 rays and are relatively short, not extending as far as the anus, and the caudal fin is slightly emarginate. This fish attains a maximum total length of 80 cm (31 in), although 50 cm (20 in) is more typical. The back and upper flanks are vivid pink or reddish while the lower flanks and abdomen are silvery-white. There is a thin blue band or line of broken spots underneath the eye. The smaller individuals found in shallow water are mainly brownish in colour.

== Distribution and habitat ==
The Gorean snapper is found in the eastern Atlantic Ocean. Its range extends along the western coast of Africa from Senegal in the north to Angola in the south, although it is less common south of the Congo River. It has also been found in the Cape Verde Islands, the Canary Islands and Madeira. The adults occur over rocky substrates and in near coral reefs. The juveniles are often recorded in coastal waters, especially estuaries and occasionally in the lower reaches of rivers. It has a depth range of 0 to 50 m (0 to 164 ft)>

== Biology ==
The Gorean snapper is a predatory species which feeds on other fishes and larger benthic invertebrates.

== Fisheries and conservation ==
The Gorean snapper is a target for commercial and artisanal fisheries throughout its range and it is taken mainly with seines, hook and line and by spearfishing. It is also caught using handlines, fixed bottom nets and trawl nets. The catch is usually sold as fresh fish. It is cultured in the brackish water zone of the Niger Delta, alongside L. agennes and the total estimated yield is 1,415 kg (3,120 lb) per hectare per annum. There is very little data on landings or the biology of this species and therefore the IUCN categorise it as Data Deficient but state that it may be vulnerable to overfishing and that its true status may be Near Threatened or Vulnerable.
