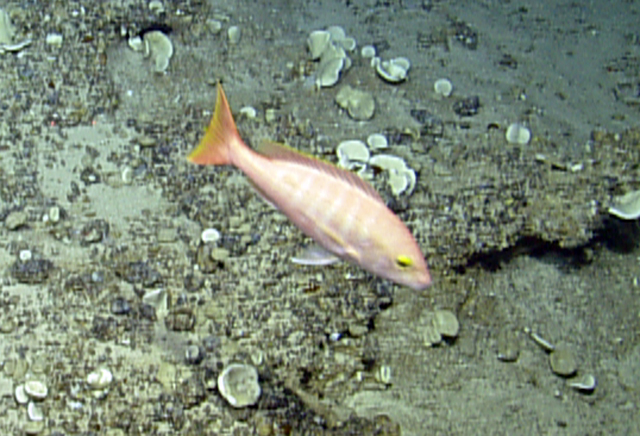

Conservation status
- Least Concern (IUCN 3.1)

Scientific classification
- Kingdom: Animalia
- Phylum: Chordata
- Class: Actinopterygii
- Order: Acanthuriformes
- Family: Lutjanidae
- Genus: Lutjanus
- Species: L. vivanus

Binomial name
- Lutjanus vivanus (Cuvier, 1828)

Synonyms
- Mesoprion vivanus Cuvier, 1828; Mesoprion profundus Poey, 1860; Lutjanus torridus Cope, 1871; Neomaenis hastingsi Bean, 1898

= Silk snapper =

Species of fish

The silk snapper (Lutjanus vivanus), the West Indian snapper, yellow-eyed snapper or yellow-eyed red snapper, is a species of marine ray-finned fish, a snapper belonging to the family Lutjanidae. It is found in the Western Atlantic Ocean.

== Taxonomy ==
The silk snapper was first formally described in 1828 as Mesoprion vivanus by the French zoologist Georges Cuvier with the type locality given as Martinique. The specific name vivanus is derived from vivaneau and vivanet, the local French names for this species on Martinique possibly originating from vivax, meaning "lively".

== Description ==
The silk snapper has a moderately deep body with quite a sharp snout, the body has an oblong shape and is laterally compressed. The front and rear nostrils are simple holes. It has a large mouth with an upper jaw which can be protruded, this slips under the cheek bone when the mouth is closed. It has 1-2 rows of conical teeth on each jaw, the front teeth being enlarged into canines. the vomerine teeth are arranged in an anchor shaped patch with a rearwards extension on middle of the roof of the mouth, there is a patch of teeth on each side of the roof of the mouth. There is a deep incision on the lower margin of the preoperculum. The dorsal fin is continuous and has no incision. The dorsal fin has 10-11 spines and 13-14 soft rays while the anal fin has 3 spines and 7-8 soft rays. Both these fins are scaled. The pectoral fins are elongate, roughly equal in length to the head in adults. The caudal fin is emarginate. The overall colour is red to pinkish-red, paler on the abdomen. Some individuals are marked with very thin wavy yellow lines on the flank. A feature differentiating this species from similar sympatric congeners is the vivid yellow iris. The fins are reddish although the anal and dorsal fins are tinted with yellow. The caudal fin has a dark margin and the pectoral fins are light yellow pectoral fins. The Juveniles have a black or red spot on the upper flanks just underneath the origin of the dorsal fin.

== Distribution and habitat ==
The silk snapper is a species of the Western Atlantic Ocean. It occurs from North Carolina and Bermuda south through the Caribbean Sea and Gulf of Mexico south as far as São Paulo, Brazil, including Trindade Island. It is found at depths from 9 to 450 m (30 to 1,476 ft). The silk snapper occurs on the edge of continental and island shelves over substrates of sand, gravel, and coral. The juveniles inhabit shallower waters than the adults.

== Biology ==
The silk snapper spends the day in deeper waters, ascending the water column at night to hunt. They are mainly predators of fish but also prey on crabs, isopods, octopus, and shrimp. This species has a maximum longevity as much as 33 years. They spawn over much of the year in lower latitudes, but are spring and summer spawners in the more temperate parts of their range. This species attains sexual maturity in males at 38 cm (15 in) and 50 cm (20 in) in females off Puerto Rico.

== Fisheries ==
The silk snapper is caught by commercial, artisanal and recreational fisheries. Fishers use traps, hook and line and sometimes bottom trawls, especially as bycatch in shrimp fisheries in Mexico. There have been reports of cases of ciguatera poisoning related to the consumption of the flesh of the silk snapper.
