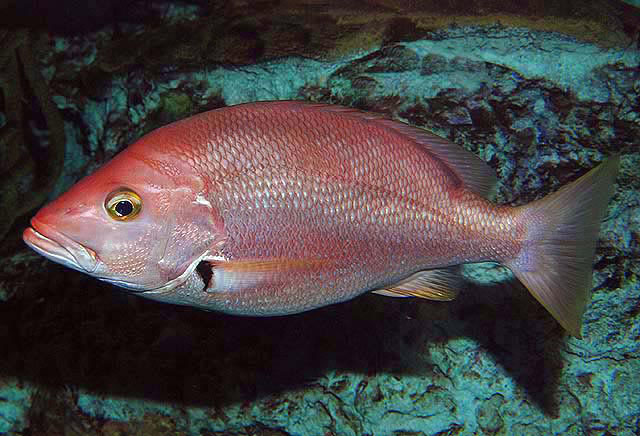

Conservation status
- Data Deficient (IUCN 3.1)

Scientific classification
- Kingdom: Animalia
- Phylum: Chordata
- Class: Actinopterygii
- Division: Teleostei
- Order: Acanthuriformes
- Family: Lutjanidae
- Genus: Lutjanus
- Species: L. buccanella

Binomial name
- Lutjanus buccanella (G. Cuvier, 1828)
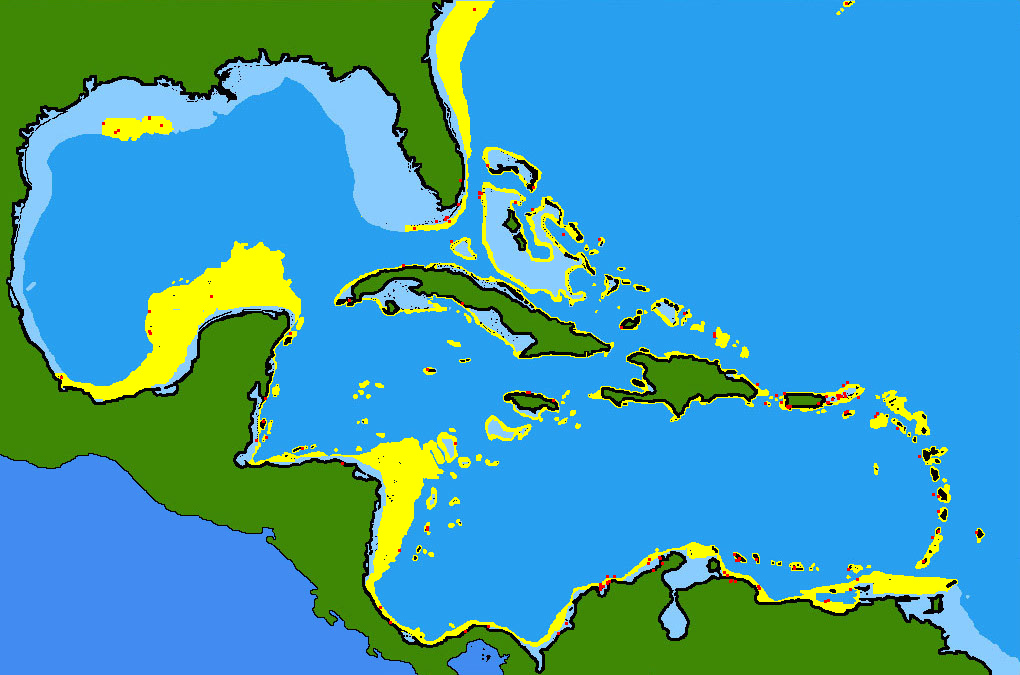

Synonyms
- Mesoprion buccanella G. Cuvier, 1828; Mesoprion caudanotatus Poey, 1851

= Blackfin snapper =

Species of fish

The blackfin snapper (Lutjanus buccanella), also known as the blackspot snapper, blackfin red snapper, gun-mouth backfin, gun-mouth snapper, redfish and wrenchman is a species of marine ray-finned fish, a snapper belonging to the family Lutjanidae. It is native to the western Atlantic Ocean. It is a commercially important species, though it has been reported to carry the ciguatera toxin.

== Taxonomy ==
The blackfin snapper was first formally described as Mesoprion buccanellla in 1828 by the French zoologist Georges Cuvier with the type locality given as jointly as Martinique and St Thomas Island in the West Indies. The specific name is based on the local name for this species on Martinique, boucanella.

== Description ==
The blackfin snapper has the typical almond-shaped body of the snappers in the genus Lutjanus, its body is relatively deep and laterally compressed. The dorsal fin is continuous but has two lobes, the caudal fin is truncate, the pectoral fins are long and the anal fin is rounded. The mouth is large with a slightly protrusible upper jaw which slips under the cheekbone when the mouth is closed. Each jaw has at least one row of pointed conical teeth some of which have developed into canines. The vomerine teeth are arranged in a chevron with a posterior extension running down the centre of the roof of mouth; on each side of the roof of the mouth there is a single tooth patch. The preopercular incision and knob are poorly developed. The scale rows on the back extend diagonally from the lateral line. The dorsal fin has 10 spines and 14 soft rays, with a slight incision after the spines, while the anal fin has 3 spines and 8 soft rays. The maximum total length recorded for this species is 75 cm (30 in) although 50 cm (20 in) is more typical, and the maximum published weight is 14.0 kg (30.9 lb). The overall colour of this species is red fading to silvery-red on the abdomen. The caudal, anal and pelvic fins are yellowish. There is an obvious dark comma at the base of the pectoral fins, which gave this fish its most widely accepted common name. The juveniles are resemble the adults but they have a wide vivid yellow patch on the dorsal part of the caudal peduncle.

== Distribution and habitat ==
The blackfin snapper is a species of the western Atlantic Ocean. Its range extends from Bermuda and North Carolina southwards along the Atlantic coast of the United States to the Bahamas, then west into the Gulf of Mexico from the Florida Keys, the Flower Garden Banks and vicinity to Veracruz, Mexico, south to the northern Yucatan Peninsula and northwestern Cuba. It also extends throughout the Caribbean Sea, along the South American coast as far south as Sao Paulo, Brazil. It occurs over sandy and rocky substrates close to ledges at depths of 60 to 90 m (200 to 300 ft). The adults are found offshore close to the continental shelf, while the juveniles are normally found in rocky outcroppings in the vicinity of reefs in shallower waters at depths between 6 and 18 m (20 and 59 ft).

== Biology ==
The blackfin snapper is social species which can aggregate in small schools. It is a predator feeding opportunistically near the sea bed. The adults' diet is dominated by smaller fishes, the juveniles feed on more invertebrates including shrimp and worms, eating more fish as they grow. This species has been recorded as spawning throughout the year, with peaks in April and September. Spawning takes place mainly off Jamaica and the eggs are pelagic, floating with the currents. This species has a number of predators throughout its life including other snappers, sharks, barracudas, groupers and moray eels.

== Fisheries and conservation ==
The blackfin snapper is considered to be a good fish for eating which is mainly sold at market as fresh fish. It is caught as part of a mixed snapper catch using traps, handlines and longlines. There have been reports of ciguatera poisoning after the consumption of the blackfin snapper. Although it is suspected that some populations may have declined there is almost no statistics on landings or abundance for this species landings. The deeper habitats and resultant specialised fishing equipment required to catch this species offer some protection from overexploitation. As there is not enough information on the population status of this species, the IUCN lists it as Data Deficient.
