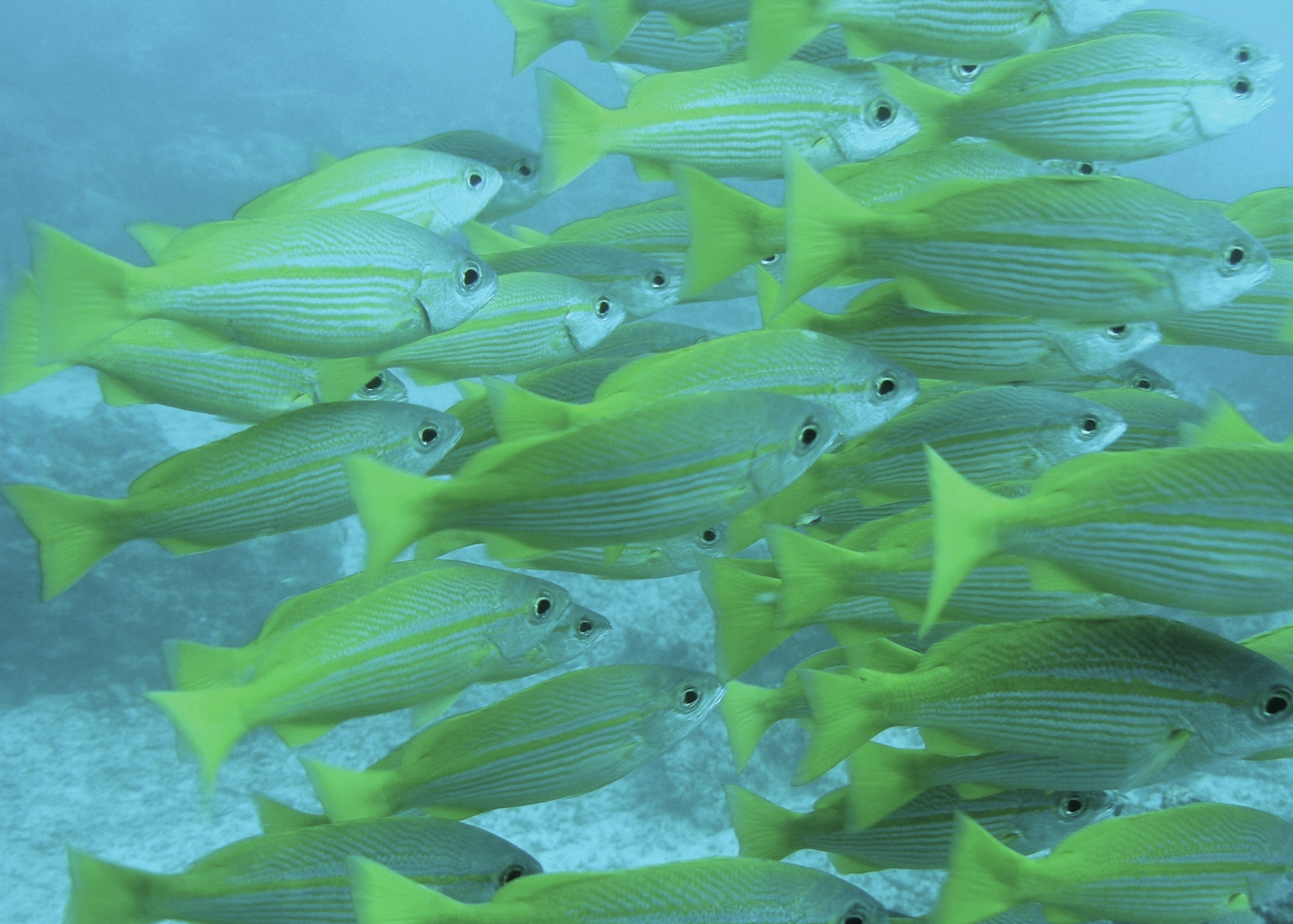
- Lutjanus lutjanus the type species of the genus Lutjanus

Scientific classification
- Kingdom: Animalia
- Phylum: Chordata
- Class: Actinopterygii
- Division: Teleostei
- Order: Acanthuriformes
- Family: Lutjanidae
- Subfamily: Lutjaninae
- Genus: Lutjanus; Bloch, 1790

Type species
- Lutjanus lutjanus Bloch, 1790

Synonyms
- List: Sciaena (Hobar) P. S. Forsskål, 1775; Lutianus Cuvier, 1798 (lapsus calami); Pagrus C. Plumier in Lacépède, 1802; Diacope Cuvier in Desmarest, 1814; Diacopus (lapsus calami); Mesoprion Cuvier, 1828; Mesoprio (lapsus calami); Genyoroge T. E. Cantor, 1849; Genyorage (lapsus calami); Neomaenis C. F. Girard, 1858; Neomaensis (lapsus calami); Neomaneis (lapsus calami); Neomansis (lapsus calami); Evoplites T. N. Gill, 1862; Neomesoprion F. L. Castelnau, 1875; Rabirubia D. S. Jordan & B. Fesler, 1893; Lutjanus (Rabirubia) D. S. Jordan & B. Fesler, 1893; Lutjanus (Raizero) D. S. Jordan & B. Fesler, 1893; Lutianus (Bennettia) H. W. Fowler, 1904; Lutianus (Parkia) H. W. Fowler, 1904; Rhomboplitoides H. W. Fowler, 1918; Jordanichthys B. W. Evermann & H. W. Clark, 1928; Lutjanus (Loxolutjanus) H. W. Fowler, 1931; Deuteracanthus H. W. Fowler, 1944; Prionodes (Percaprionodes) H. W. Fowler, 1944

= Lutjanus =

Lutjanus Temporal range: Early Oligocene–present

Genus of ray-finned fishes

Lutjanus is a genus of marine ray-finned fish, snappers belonging to the family Lutjanidae. They are found in the Atlantic, Indian, and Pacific Oceans. They are predatory fish usually found in tropical and subtropical reefs and mangrove forests. This genus also includes two species that only occur in fresh and brackish waters.

== Description ==
Lutjanus snappers are small to large in size with oblong-shaped bodies, which vary from deep to slender and fusiform. These snappers are extremely variable in colour, frequently having a background colour of reddish, yellow, grey, or brown overlain with a pattern of darker stripes or bars. They are often marked with a large, blackish spot on the upper flanks underneath the front soft rays of the dorsal fin. They have relatively large mouths which are protractable. The teeth are arranged in one or more rows in the jaws and are pointed and conical in shape, with the outer row consisting of canine-like teeth with the anterior ones enlarged into more obvious canine-like fangs. The vomerine teeth are arranged in patches, which may be chevron, triangular, or lunate and may or may not have a posterior extension or be arranged in a rhombus. The space between the eyes is convex, and they have a serrated preopercle, which has a deep incision on its lower margin. They sometimes have a bony knob between the operculum and the preopercle that is most obvious in those species with a deep incision in the preopercle.

Lujanus species have continuous dorsal fins, frequently with a slight incision between the spiny portion and the soft-rayed portion. The spiny part of the dorsal fin may have 10 or 11 spines, while the soft-rayed part may have 11 to 16 rays. The anal fin has three spines and between seven and 10 soft rays, while the pectoral fins have between 15 and 18 soft rays. The dorsal and anal fins are scaled, while the caudal fin may be emarginated, truncated, or rarely, forked.

Lutjanus species, especially the larger ones, are important commercial fish and are considered to be excellent food fish in the tropics. The catch is taken using a variety of methods, including handlines, traps, spears, nets, and trawling gear. They are mainly sold as fresh fish, but may be preserved by freezing or dry-salting.

== Biology ==
Lutjanus snappers have a circumtropical and subtropical distribution and are found in the Atlantic, Indian, and Pacific Oceans. The mangrove red snapper (Lutjanus argentimaculatus), and the dory snapper (Lutjanus fulviflamma) has been recorded in the Mediterranean as possible Lessepsian migrants, having entered that sea through the Suez Canal from the Red Sea, while the dog snapper (Lutjanus jocu), a western Atlantic species, has been recorded in the Ligurian Sea. Many species are associated with coral reefs, where they are conspicuous members of the fish fauna, while some of the larger red snapper species descend into deeper waters, at least to 200 m (660 ft) in depth. 2 species, L. fuscescens and L. maxweberi, only occur in fresh and brackish waters.

Smaller Lutjanus species are often observed in large, diurnal aggregations, which stay near the reef; these disperse at night to feed. Their diet is largely made up of fishes and crustaceans. Group spawning has been obserbed in at least one species. Courtship is initiated by the males, which peck and rub themselves on the females' bodies, and when other individuals are attracted to the initial pair, they all spiral towards the surface, releasing the milt and eggs just underneath the surface. The eggs are minute and spherical in shape and take 18 hours or so to hatch into larvae.

== Taxonomy ==
Lutjanus was created in 1790 by German physician and zoologist Marcus Elieser Bloch, with Lutjanus lutjanus as its type species by tautonymy. It is the type genus of the subfamily Lutjaninae and the family Lutjanidae. The name is derived from a local Indonesian name for snappers, ikhan Lutjang. Bloch erroneously stated that the type locality for L. lutjanus was Japan, when the name he gave it suggested that it was collected in the East Indies. A taxonomic study of snappers within the subfamily Lutjaninae in the tropical western Atlantic Ocean indicated that the monotypic genera Ocyurus and Rhomboplites sit within the genus Lutjanus. Lutjanus ambiguus is considered by some authorities to most likely to be a hybrid between L. synagris and Ocyurus chrysurus, supporting the close relation between the two genera.

=== Species ===
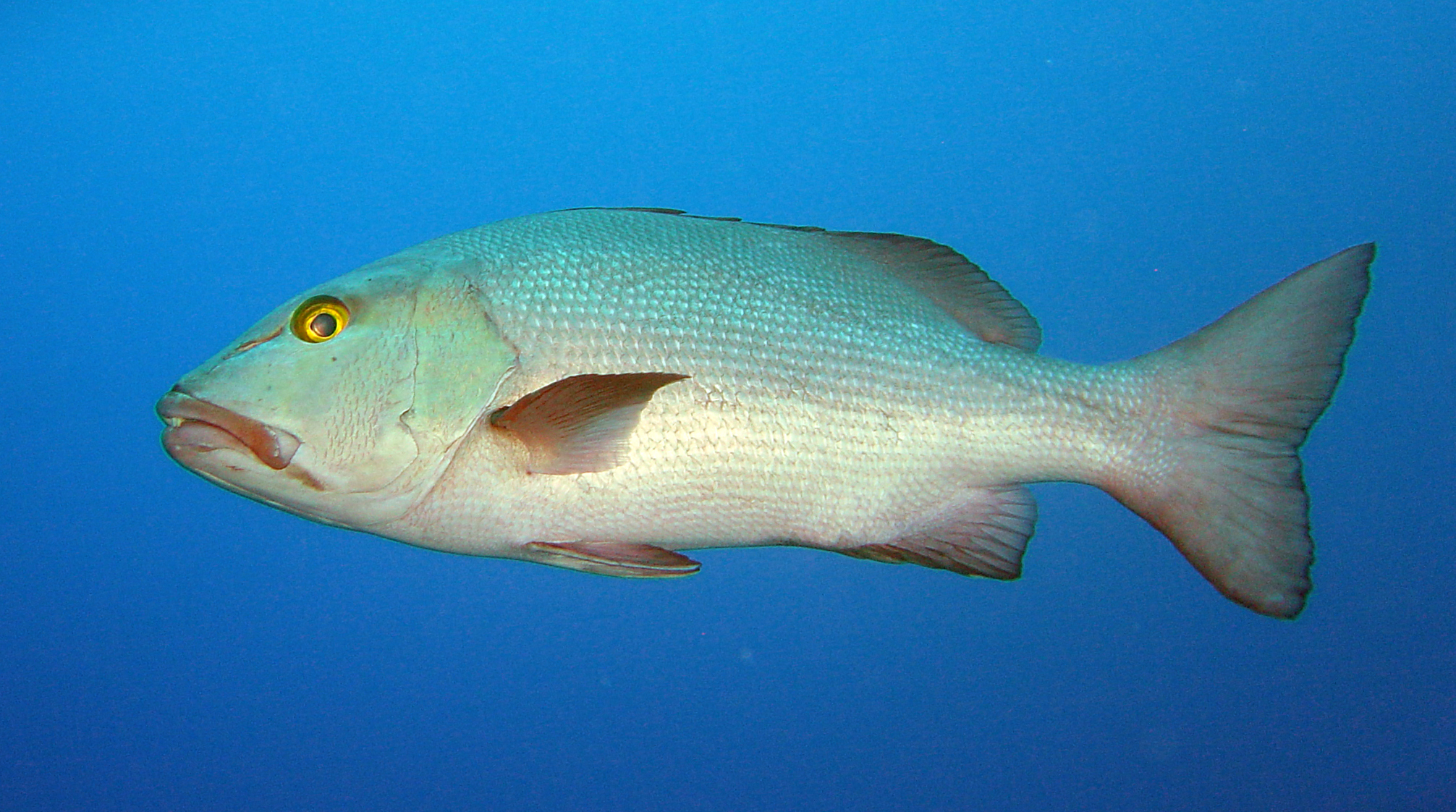
Lutjanus bohar

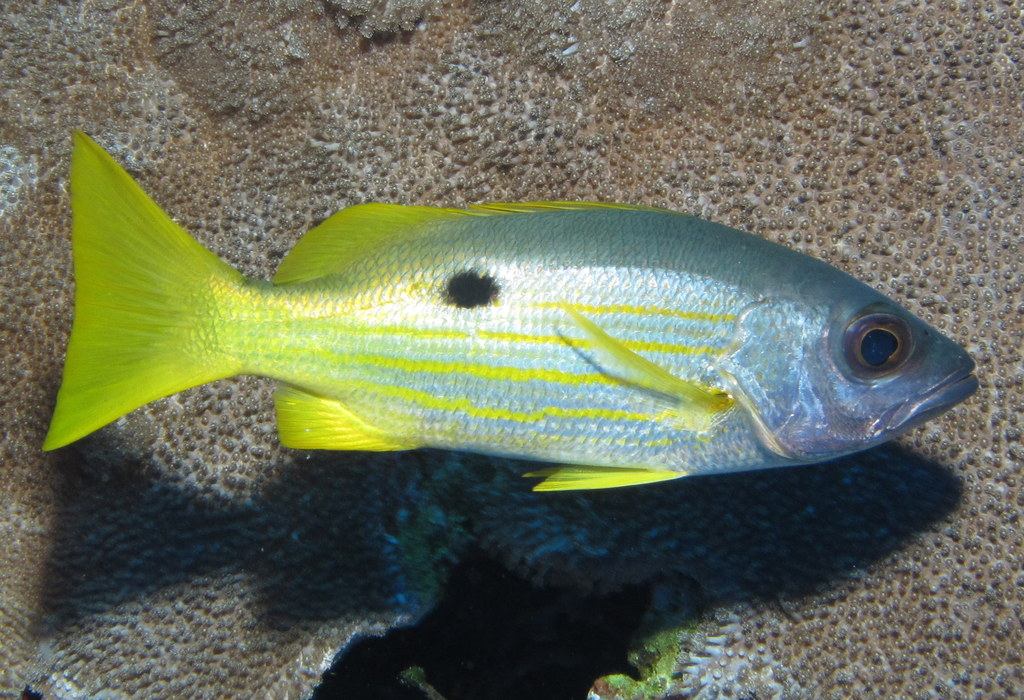
Lutjanus ehrenbergii

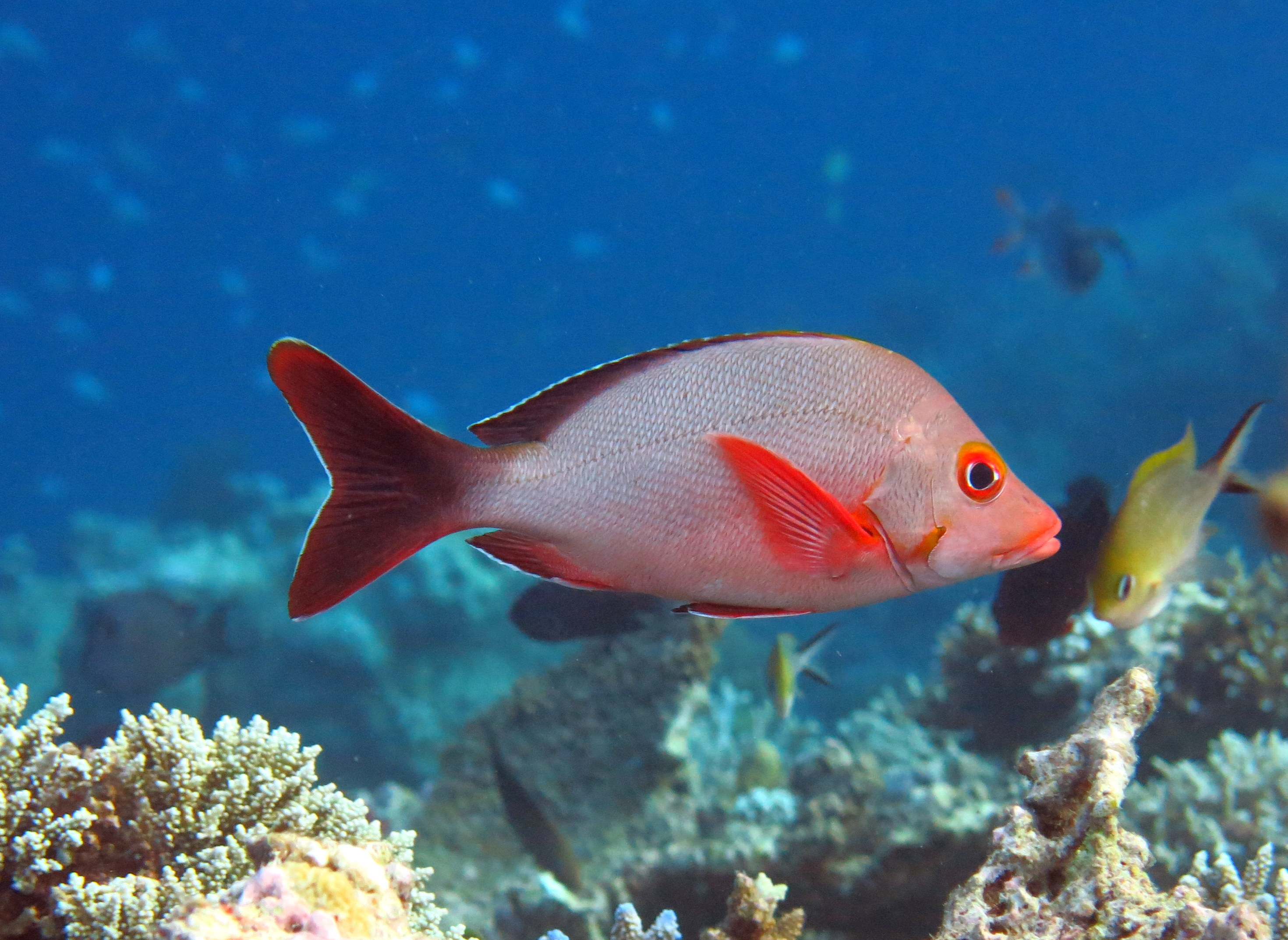
Lutjanus gibbus

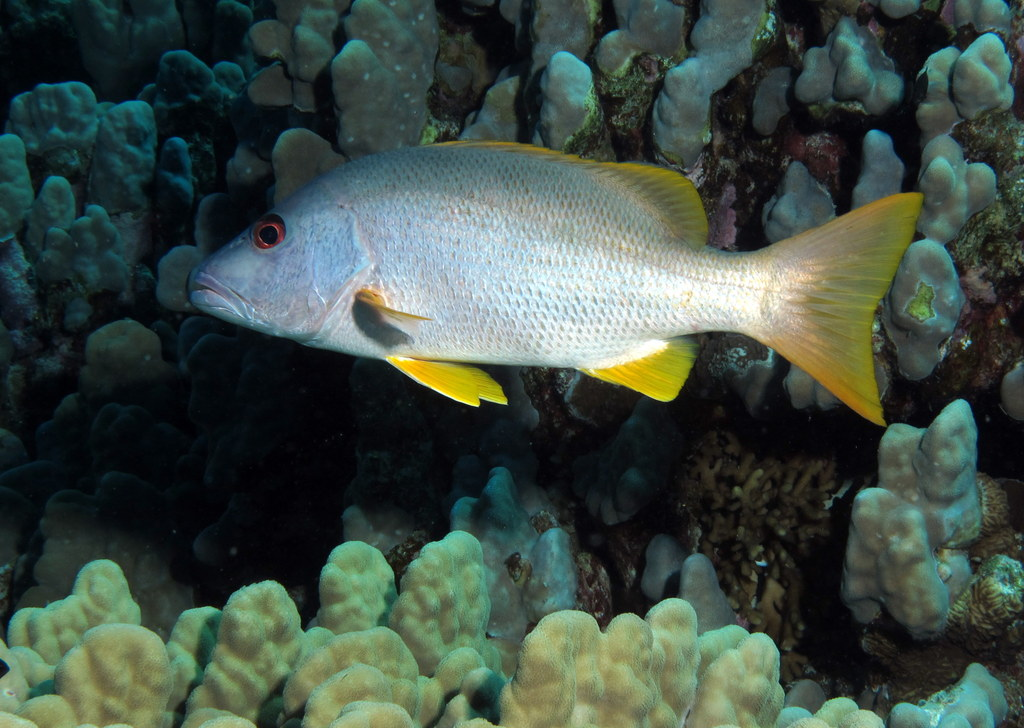
Lutjanus monostigma

Currently, 73 recognized species are placed in this genus:

- Lutjanus adetii (Castelnau, 1873) (yellow-banded snapper)
- Lutjanus agennes Bleeker, 1863 (African red snapper)
- Lutjanus alexandrei R. L. Moura & Lindeman, 2007 (Brazilian snapper)
- Lutjanus ambiguus (Poey, 1860) (ambiguous snapper)
- Lutjanus analis (Cuvier, 1828) (mutton snapper)
- Lutjanus apodus (Walbaum, 1792) (schoolmaster snapper)
- Lutjanus aratus (Günther, 1864) (mullet snapper)
- Lutjanus argentimaculatus (Forsskål, 1775) (mangrove red snapper)
- Lutjanus argentiventris (W. K. H. Peters, 1869) (yellow snapper)
- Lutjanus bengalensis (Bloch, 1790) (Bengal snapper)
- Lutjanus biguttatus (Valenciennes, 1830) (two-spot banded snapper)
- Lutjanus bitaeniatus (Valenciennes, 1830) (Indonesian snapper)
- Lutjanus bohar (Forsskål, 1775) (two-spot red snapper)
- Lutjanus boutton (Lacépède, 1802) (Moluccan snapper)
- Lutjanus buccanella (Cuvier, 1828) (blackfin snapper)
- Lutjanus campechanus (Poey, 1860) (northern red snapper)
- Lutjanus carponotatus (J. Richardson, 1842) (Spanish flag snapper)
- Lutjanus coeruleolineatus (Rüppell, 1838) (blue-line snapper)
- Lutjanus colorado D. S. Jordan & C. H. Gilbert, 1882 (Colorado snapper)
- Lutjanus cyanopterus (Cuvier, 1828) (cubera snapper)
- Lutjanus decussatus (Cuvier, 1828) (checkered snapper)
- Lutjanus dentatus (A. H. A. Duméril, 1861) (African brown snapper)
- Lutjanus dodecacanthoides (Bleeker, 1854) (sunbeam snapper)
- Lutjanus ehrenbergii (W. K. H. Peters, 1869) (black-spot snapper)
- Lutjanus endecacanthus Bleeker, 1863 (Guinea snapper)
- Lutjanus erythropterus Bloch, 1790 (crimson snapper)
- Lutjanus fulgens (Valenciennes, 1830) (golden African snapper)
- Lutjanus fulviflamma (Forsskål, 1775) (dory snapper)
- Lutjanus fulvus (J. R. Forster, 1801) (black-tail snapper)
- Lutjanus fuscescens (Valenciennes, 1830) (freshwater snapper)
- Lutjanus gibbus (Forsskål, 1775) (humpback red snapper)
- Lutjanus goldiei (W. J. Macleay, 1882) (Papuan black snapper)
- Lutjanus goreensis (Valenciennes, 1830) (Gorean snapper)
- Lutjanus griseus (Linnaeus, 1758) (grey snapper)
- Lutjanus guilcheri Fourmanoir, 1959 (yellow-fin red snapper)
- Lutjanus guttatus (Steindachner, 1869) (spotted rose snapper)
- Lutjanus indicus G. R. Allen, W. T. White & Erdmann, 2013
- Lutjanus inermis (W. K. H. Peters, 1869) (golden snapper)
- Lutjanus jocu (Bloch & J. G. Schneider, 1801) (dog snapper)
- Lutjanus johnii (Bloch, 1792) (John's snapper)
- Lutjanus jordani (C. H. Gilbert, 1898) (Jordan's snapper)
- Lutjanus kasmira (Forsskål, 1775) (common blue-striped snapper)
- Lutjanus lemniscatus (Valenciennes, 1828) (yellow-streaked snapper)
- Lutjanus lunulatus (M. Park, 1797) (lunar-tail snapper)
- Lutjanus lutjanus Bloch, 1790 (big-eye snapper)
- Lutjanus madras (Valenciennes, 1831) (Indian snapper)
- Lutjanus mahogoni (Cuvier, 1828) (mahogany snapper)
- Lutjanus malabaricus (Bloch & J. G. Schneider, 1801) (Malabar blood snapper)
- Lutjanus maxweberi Popta, 1921 (pygmy snapper)
- Lutjanus mizenkoi G. R. Allen & Talbot, 1985 (Samoan snapper)
- Lutjanus monostigma (Cuvier, 1828) (one-spot snapper)
- Lutjanus notatus (Cuvier, 1828) (blue-striped snapper)
- Lutjanus novemfasciatus T. N. Gill, 1862 (Pacific dog snapper or Pacific cubera snapper
- Lutjanus octolineatus (Cuvier, 1828) (white-belly snapper)
- Lutjanus ophuysenii (Bleeker, 1860) (spot-stripe snapper)
- Lutjanus papuensis G. R. Allen, W. T. White & Erdmann, 2013 (Papuan snapper)
- Lutjanus peru (Nichols & R. C. Murphy, 1922) (Pacific red snapper)
- Lutjanus purpureus (Poey, 1866) (southern red snapper)
- Lutjanus quinquelineatus (Bloch, 1790) (five-lined snapper)
- Lutjanus rivulatus (Cuvier, 1828) (blubber-lip snapper)
- Lutjanus rufolineatus (Valenciennes, 1830) (yellow-lined snapper)
- Lutjanus russellii (Bleeker, 1849) (Russell's snapper)
- Lutjanus sanguineus (Cuvier, 1828) (humphead snapper or scarlet snapper)
- Lutjanus sapphirolineatus Iwatsuki, Al-Mamry & Heemstra, 2016 (Arabian blue-striped snapper)
- Lutjanus sebae (Cuvier, 1816) (emperor red snapper)
- Lutjanus semicinctus Quoy & Gaimard, 1824 (black-banded snapper)
- Lutjanus stellatus Akazaki, 1983 (star snapper)
- Lutjanus synagris (Linnaeus, 1758) (Lane snapper)
- Lutjanus timorensis (Quoy & Gaimard, 1824) (Timor snapper)
- Lutjanus viridis (Valenciennes, 1846) (blue and gold snapper)
- Lutjanus vitta (Quoy & Gaimard, 1824) (brown-stripe red snapper)
- Lutjanus vivanus (Cuvier, 1828) (silk snapper)
- Lutjanus xanthopinnis Iwatsuki, F. Tanaka & G. R. Allen, 2015 (yellow-fin snapper)

One fossil species, †Lutjanus avus Gregory, 1930 is known from a partial specimen from the Early Oligocene of Florida.

=== Phylogeny ===
The following cladogram is based on the phylogenetic tree from a 2007 study using Bayesian Inference to analyze a combined dataset of 16S and cyt b:

- Nemipteridae
  - Nemipterus marginatus
  - Scolopsis ciliata
- - Sparidae
    - - Acanthopagrus berda
      - Sparidentex hasta
    - - Rhabdosargus thorpei
      - Sparodon durbanensis
  - - Haemulidae
      - - Diagramma labiosum
        - Plectorhinchus chrysotaenia
      - - Haemulon sciurus
        - Pomadasys maculatus
    - - Lethrinidae
        - Lethrinus ornatus
        - Lethrinus rubrioperculatus
      - Lutjanidae
        - - Etelinae
            - Aphareus furca
            - Aprion virescens
          - Paradicichthyinae
            - Symphorus nematophorus
            - Symphorichthys spilurus
        - ⊞Lutjaninae & Caesioninae (Paraphyletic)
          ⊟
          - Lutjaninae
            - - Lutjanus johnii
              - Lutjanus erythropterus
            - - Lutjanus adetii
              - Lutjanus sebae
          - - - Lutjaninae
                - Lutjanus bohar
                - Lutjanus gibbus
              - - Lutjaninae
                  Macolor niger
                - Caesioninae
                  - - Pterocaesio tile
                    - Caesio caerulaurea
                  - - Caesio cuning
                    - - Pterocaesio marri
                      - Pterocaesio pisang
            - Lutjaninae
              - - - Lutjanus decussatus
                  - Lutjanus vitta
                - - Lutjanus fulviflamma
                  - - Lutjanus monostigma
                    - - Lutjanus carponotatus
                      - Lutjanus russellii
              - - Lutjanus argentimaculatus
                - - - Lutjanus synagris
                    - - Rhomboplites aurorubens
                      - Lutjanus campechanus
                  - - Lutjanus stellatus
                    - - Lutjanus fulvus
                      - - Lutjanus kasmira
                        - Lutjanus quinquelineatus

The following cladogram is based on a 2023 phylogenetic analysis studying 16S RNA (left tree) and COI (right) MtDNA:

- - - - - - - - - - Lutjanus russellii
                  - Lutjanus carponotatus
                - Lutjanus fulviflamma
              - Lutjanus monostigma
            - - Lutjanus lutjanus
              - - Lutjanus vitta
                - Lutjanus xanthopinnis
          - - - - Lutjanus erythropterus
                - Lutjanus gibbus
              - Lutjanus bohar
            - - Lutjanus argentimaculatus
              - - Lutjanus sebae
                - - Lutjanus malabaricus
                  - Lutjanus timoriensis
        - Lutjanus fulvus
      - Lutjanus stellatus
    - - Lutjanus bengalensis
      - - Lutjanus quinquelineatus
        - Lutjanus kasmira
  - Lutjanus johnii
- Pristipomoides multidens

- - - - - - - - - Lutjanus russellii
                - Lutjanus carponotatus
              - Lutjanus fulviflamma
            - Lutjanus monostigma
          - - Lutjanus lutjanus
            - - Lutjanus vitta
              - Lutjanus xanthopinnis
        - - - Lutjanus argentimaculatus
            - Lutjanus stellatus
          - - Lutjanus fulvus
            - - Lutjanus quinquelineatus
              - - Lutjanus bengalensis
                - Lutjanus kasmira
      - Lutjanus johnii
    - - Lutjanus gibbus
      - Lutjanus bohar
  - - Lutjanus sebae
    - - Lutjanus timoriensis
      - - Lutjanus erythropterus
        - Lutjanus malabaricus
- Pristipomoides multidens
