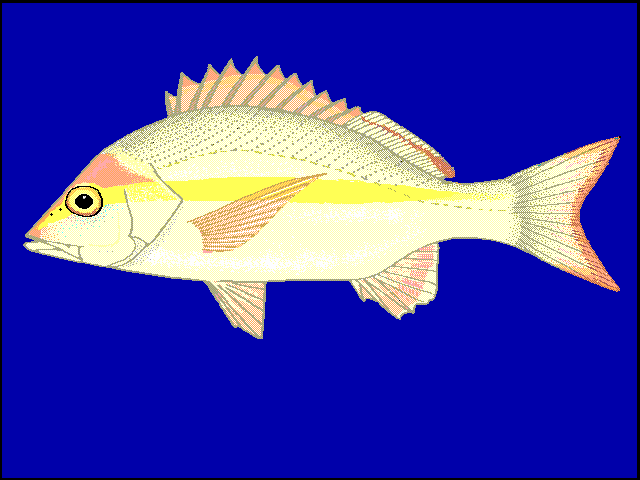

Conservation status
- Least Concern (IUCN 3.1)

Scientific classification
- Kingdom: Animalia
- Phylum: Chordata
- Class: Actinopterygii
- Division: Teleostei
- Order: Acanthuriformes
- Family: Lutjanidae
- Genus: Lutjanus
- Species: L. adetii

Binomial name
- Lutjanus adetii (Castelnau, 1873)

Synonyms
- Diacope adetii Castelnau, 1873; Genyoroge unicolor Alleyne & W. J. Macleay, 1877; Genyoroge amabilis De Vis, 1884; Lutjanus castelnaui Whitley, 1928; Lutjanus paravitta Postel, 1965

= Lutjanus adetii =

Species of fish

Lutjanus adetii, the yellow-banded snapper or hussar, is a species of marine ray-finned fish, a snapper belonging to the family Lutjanidae. It is native to the southwestern Pacific Ocean. This species is of minor importance to local commercial fisheries and is sought after as a game fish.

== Taxonomy ==
Lutjanus adetii was first formally described in 1873 as Diacope adetii by the French naturalist François-Louis Laporte, comte de Castelnau with the type locality given as Nouméa on New Caledonia. Its specific name honours "Mr Adet" who collected the specimens of fishes that Castelnau described from New Caledonia, Castelnau did not give Adet's given names.

== Description ==
Lutjanus adetii has a relatively deep body, which has a standard length of 2.5 to 2.7 times its depth. The snout is rather pointed, the preorbital bone is wider than the diameter of the eye and there is a well developed preopercular protuberance and incision. The tongue has a patch of granular teeth while the vomerine teeth are arranged in a triangular patch. The dorsal fin has 10 spines and 14 soft rays while the anal fin contains 3 spines and 8 soft rays, these fins have a rounded posterior profile. The pectoral fins contain 17 rays while the caudal fin may be emarginate or slightly forked. The background colour is rosy-pink shading to silvery below with a dusky to golden stripe which runs from the middle of the operculum to the base of the caudal fin. There is a golden patch which surrounds the eye and runs onto the snout while the pectoral fin base has a yellow blotch, The dorsal and anal fins have white margins. The juveniles have a sizeable red spot on the caudal peduncle, which some retain while the mid lateral stripe appears. This species attains a maximum total length of 50 cm (20 in), although 30 cm (12 in) is more typical.

== Distribution and habitat ==
Lutjanus adetii has a restricted distribution in the southwest Pacific Ocean. It occurs in eastern Australia, eastern Papua New Guinea and New Caledonia. In Australia it occurs from the northern Great Barrier Reef in Queensland south to Sydney in New South Wales, with small juveniles being recorded further south, and Lord Howe Island in the Tasman Sea. This species occur from the surface down to 40 m (130 ft) living among rocky and coral reefs.

== Biology ==
Lutjanus adetii is a nocturnal hunter, the adults spend the day in large aggregations which disperse at night to forage Off New Caledonia the spawning season is from August to February, peaking in November to January.

== Fisheries ==
Lutjanus adetii is mainly of interest to recreational fisheries. Its flesh is considered to be of good quality and it is caught for markets in some localities, especially in New Caledonia. It is caught using hook and line and gill nets and the catch is normally sold fresh. The hussar is one of the species taken in the coral reef finfish fishery of Australia.
