= Truncation =

In mathematics, limiting the number of digits right of the decimal point

In mathematics and computer science, truncation is limiting the number of digits right of the decimal point.

== Truncation and floor function ==
Truncation of positive real numbers can be done using the floor function. Given a number $x \in \mathbb{R}_+$ to be truncated and $n \in \mathbb{N}_0$, the number of elements to be kept behind the decimal point, the truncated value of x is
$$\operatorname{trunc}(x,n) = \frac{\lfloor 10^n \cdot x \rfloor}{10^n}$$

However, for negative numbers truncation does not round in the same direction as the floor function: truncation always rounds toward zero, the $\operatorname{floor}$ function rounds towards negative infinity. For a given number $x \in \mathbb{R}_-$, the function $\operatorname{ceil}$ is used instead:
$$\operatorname{trunc}(x,n) = \frac{\lceil 10^n \cdot x \rceil}{10^n}$$

== Causes of truncation ==
With computers, truncation can occur when a decimal number is typecast as an integer; it is truncated to zero decimal digits because integers cannot store non-integer real numbers.

== In algebra ==
An analogue of truncation can be applied to polynomials. In this case, the truncation of a polynomial P to degree n can be defined as the sum of all terms of P of degree n or less. Polynomial truncations arise in the study of Taylor polynomials, for example.

== See also ==
- Rounding
- Arithmetic precision
- Quantization (signal processing)
- Precision (computer science)
- Truncation (statistics)
