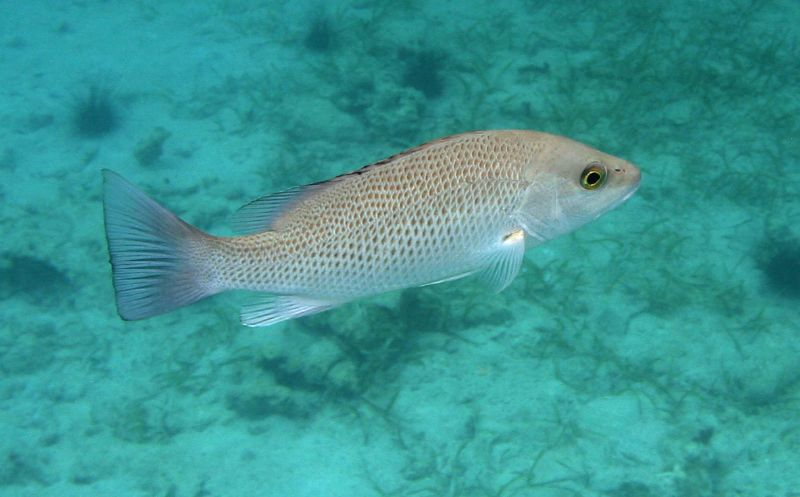

Conservation status
- Least Concern (IUCN 3.1)

Scientific classification
- Kingdom: Animalia
- Phylum: Chordata
- Class: Actinopterygii
- Division: Teleostei
- Order: Acanthuriformes
- Family: Lutjanidae
- Genus: Lutjanus
- Species: L. griseus

Binomial name
- Lutjanus griseus (Linnaeus, 1758)
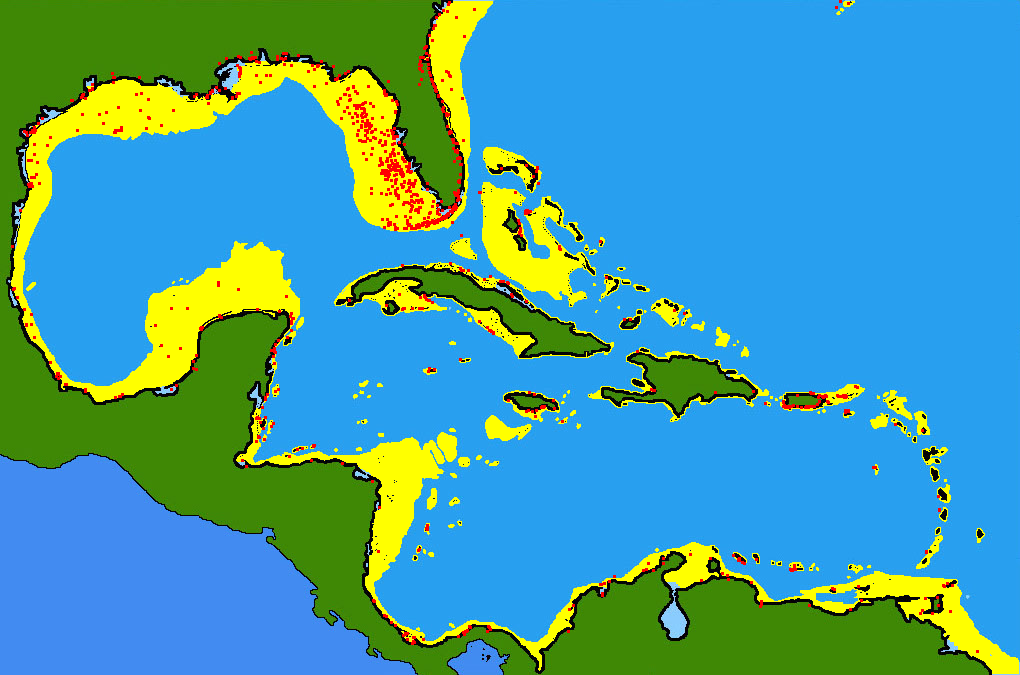

Synonyms
- Labrus griseus Linnaeus, 1758; Sparus tetracanthus Bloch, 1791; Anthias caballerote Bloch & J. G. Schneider, 1801; Lutjanus caballerote (Bloch & J. G. Schneider, 1801); Mesoprion caballeorte (Bloch & J. G. Schneider, 1801); Bodianus vivanetus Lacépède, 1802; Lobotes emarginatus Baird & Girard, 1855; Lutjanus stearnsii Goode & T.H. Bean, 1878

= Mangrove snapper =

Species of fish

The mangrove snapper or gray snapper (Lutjanus griseus) is a species of snapper native to the western Atlantic Ocean from Massachusetts to Brazil, the Gulf of Mexico, Bermuda, and the Caribbean Sea. The species can be found in a wide variety of habitats, including brackish and fresh waters. It is commercially important and is sought as a game fish. It can also be found in the aquarium trade.

== Description ==
Its color is typically greyish red, but can change color from bright red to copper red. It has a dark stripe running across its eye if observed from the top when it is under water. This species can reach a length of 89 cm (35 in), though most do not exceed 40 cm (16 in). The greatest recorded weight for this species is 20 kg (44 lb).

The mangrove snapper can be confused with the cubera snapper or black snapper, L. cyanopterus. Mangrove snapper are typically much smaller than cubera, but when they are of similar size, the two species can only be distinguished by examining the tooth patch on the inside roof of the mouth. Many specimens caught in Florida, specifically Punta Gorda, are actually misidentified dogtooth or dog snapper, L. jocu. The best way to distinguish between the two species is the dog snapper has a lighter triangle of color with a blue band under the eye and large, and sharp fangs in the front (canines), hence its common name. These fangs can deliver a painful bite, even in a small fish. The mangrove snapper feeds mostly on small fishes, crustaceans (such as crabs and shrimp), cephalopods, gastropods, polychaete worms and some planktonic items (including copepods and amphipods). It was also observed as systematically waiting under a maternal colony of buffy flower bats, for falling bats near the entrances of Lucayan cavern, Bahamas.

== Habitat ==
The mangrove snapper is one of the most common species of snapper in warmer regions. It can be found in many areas from canals to grass flats, as well as in open water. Mangrove snapper also prefer structure, such as docks, mangroves, shipwrecks, and debris. Most mangrove snapper in the open water are generally found near bottom structure or reefs. They can be found at depths from 5 to 180 m (16 to 591 ft), though are mostly found at less than 50 m (160 ft).

== Sport fishing ==
Mangrove snapper are common targets for anglers, and are highly prized for their light and flaky flesh. They can be found year around and are often found in the mangroves, and around docks or other structures. They are easy to catch, which makes fishing for them ideal for beginner anglers. In addition, they are usually found in schools, so catching many in a short time is not uncommon. They are relatively strong for their size, and they put up a good fight when hooked. They can be caught on a variety of baits, but are typically caught with live or frozen shrimp, squid, pilchards, mullet, ballyhoo, pinfish, and occasionally on artificial lures or baits. They can be spearfished, as well, but are sometimes a tough target, as they tend to be more wary of divers, rather than curious, and their wariness of baits and divers tends to increase as the fish grow larger. Most mangrove snapper are caught on light to medium tackle, and typical catches range from 8 to 14 in long (0.5-2.0 lb) in shallow or in-shore waters, and up to 20 in long (about 5 lb) in deeper waters. Larger fish are uncommon, but not rare.

== Farming ==
The species is farmed in offshore floating fish farms in Asia and Oceania; one example is the floating fish farms off Pulau Ubin Island, Singapore, and along the southwest side along the Singapore strait. Farmed for consumption, they are sold to restaurants and supermarkets in Singapore and around the world.
