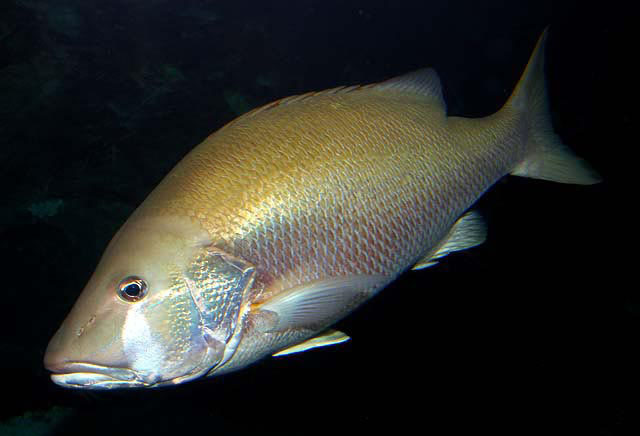

Conservation status
- Data Deficient (IUCN 3.1)

Scientific classification
- Kingdom: Animalia
- Phylum: Chordata
- Class: Actinopterygii
- Order: Acanthuriformes
- Family: Lutjanidae
- Genus: Lutjanus
- Species: L. jocu

Binomial name
- Lutjanus jocu (Bloch & J. G. Schneider, 1801)
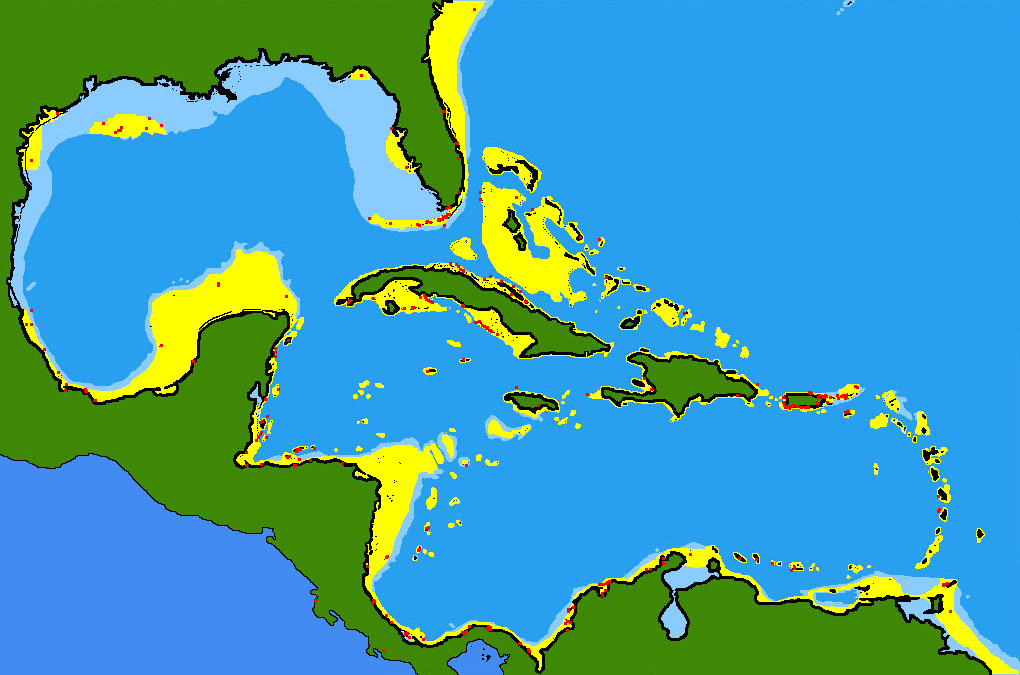

Synonyms
- Anthias jocu Bloch & J. G. Schneider, 1801; Mesoprion litura G. Cuvier, 1828

= Dog snapper =

Species of fish

The dog snapper (Lutjanus jocu), also known as the dogtooth snapper, pargue or snaggletooth snapper, is a species of marine ray-finned fish, a snapper belonging to the family Lutjanidae. It is native to the Atlantic Ocean. It is a commercially important species, and is popular for display in public aquaria.

== Taxonomy ==
The dog snapper was first formally described in 1801 as Anthias jocu by the German naturalists Marcus Elieser Bloch and Johann Gottlob Schneider with no type locality given, although this is thought to be Havana. The specific name jocu is the local name for this species in Cuba, according to the Portuguese naturalist Antonio Parra.

== Description ==
The dog snapper has a relatively deep, compressed body. It has long pectoral fins, an emarginate or slightly forked caudal fin, a rounded anal fin and a bilobed dorsal fin. Its nostrils are arranged in front and rear pairs and are simple tubes. It has a relatively large mouth which has a moderately protrusible upper jaw which slips under the cheekbone in the closed mouth. A pair of very enlarged canine-like teeth in the upper jaw stay visible when the mouth is closed. The vomerine teeth are arranged in a chevron or crescent shape with a long rearwards extension running from its middle, creating an anchor like shape. There is also a patch of teeth on each side of the roof of the mouth. The preoperculum has a weakly developed incision and knob. The dorsal fin has 10 spines and 14–15 soft rays while the anal fin contains 3 spines and 8 soft rays. The long perctoral fin extends as far as the anus and contains16-17 rays. This fish attains a maximum total length of 128 cm (50 in), although 60 cm (24 in) is more typical, and the maximum published weight is 28.6 kg (63 lb). The adults have olive green upper flanks and backs, which may be marked with slender light-coloured bars. The lower flanks and abdomen are pale red and copper. Beneath the eyes there is a white triangular bar. The pectoral, pelvic, anal fins and outer parts of the soft rayed part of the dorsal fin and the caudal fin are reddish, while the remainder of the dorsal and caudal fins are olive green in colour. The juveniles have a longitudinal blue line underneath the eye extending on to the gill cover, this breaks up into a line of spots in the adults.

== Distribution and habitat ==
Dog snapper is mainly found in the western Atlantic Ocean where their range extends from Massachusetts south to São Paulo in Brazil, including the Bermuda, the Caribbean Sea and Gulf of Mexico and from Saint Paul's Rocks south to Principe in the eastern Atlantic. A first single record was reported for the Mediterranean Sea in 2005 in Ligurian waters, Italy. Adults are generally found around rocky outcrops or coral reefs, while juveniles tend to remain primarily within estuaries and occasionally within rivers. Dog snappers are known to have occurred at depths in excess of 100 m (330 ft) in some areas but they are more frequent at depths of 5 to 30 m (16 to 98 ft).

== Biology ==
Dog snappers tend to be solitary, aggregating to spawn in the early spring.

=== Feeding ===
Dog snappers are nocturnal predators, and prey on smaller fish and benthic invertebrates, including crustaceans (including crabs and shrimps), gastropods, and cephalopods.

=== Breeding ===
Dog snappers have their main breeding grounds off Jamaica and in the northeastern Caribbean where they typically spawn during March. They do spawn elsewhere in their range but not to the same extents as in the early Spring in the Caribbean. They may form spawning aggregations, often mixed with Cubera snappers (L. cyanopterus). Off Brazil they spawn twice a year and the gonads are most developed between June and October. This species has planktonic eggs and larvae which are spread by the current. Little is known about the development of the larvae until the post-larval stage finally settles into suitable habitat where it gains a measure of protection from predators.

=== Predators and parasites ===
Dog snappers are preyed on by large predatory fish such as sharks and groupers as adults, smaller fish are prey to a number of different marine animals. monogenean worms from the genus Euryhaliotrema have been recorded living on the gills of different snapper species, including this species. Copepods of the genus Caligus, the Acanthocephalan worm Gorgorhynchus cablei, the digeneans in the genus Hamacreadium, Helicometrina and Metadena are also known to be parasites on dog snappers.

== Fisheries and conservation ==
The dog snapper has been known to be ciguatoxic, especially the larger specimens, and in areas where this is known there is little interest in fishing for this species. However, where ciguatoxicity is rare this species is a valued food fish and is pursued by commercial fisheries. They are caught using handlines, gill nets, traps, seines, and spears. The catch is sold as fresh and frozen fish. This species seems to be overexploited in some of its range and the juvenile mangrove habitat is threatened by coastal development. In most of its range no catch data is collected and as a result of the lack of data, the perceived decline and the habitat loss for juveniles the IUCN has classified this species as Data Deficient. It is sometimes display in public aquaria.
