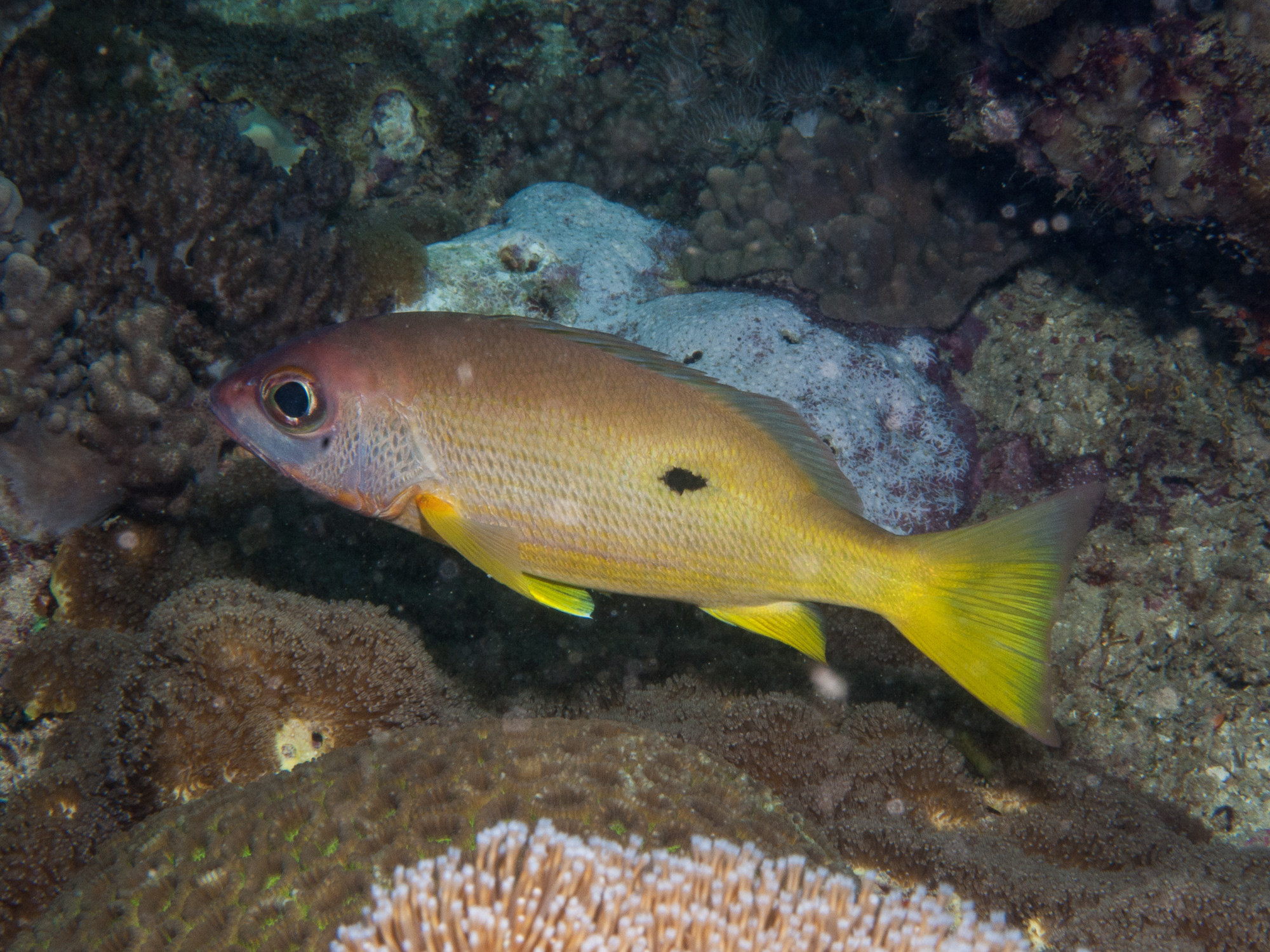
- adult
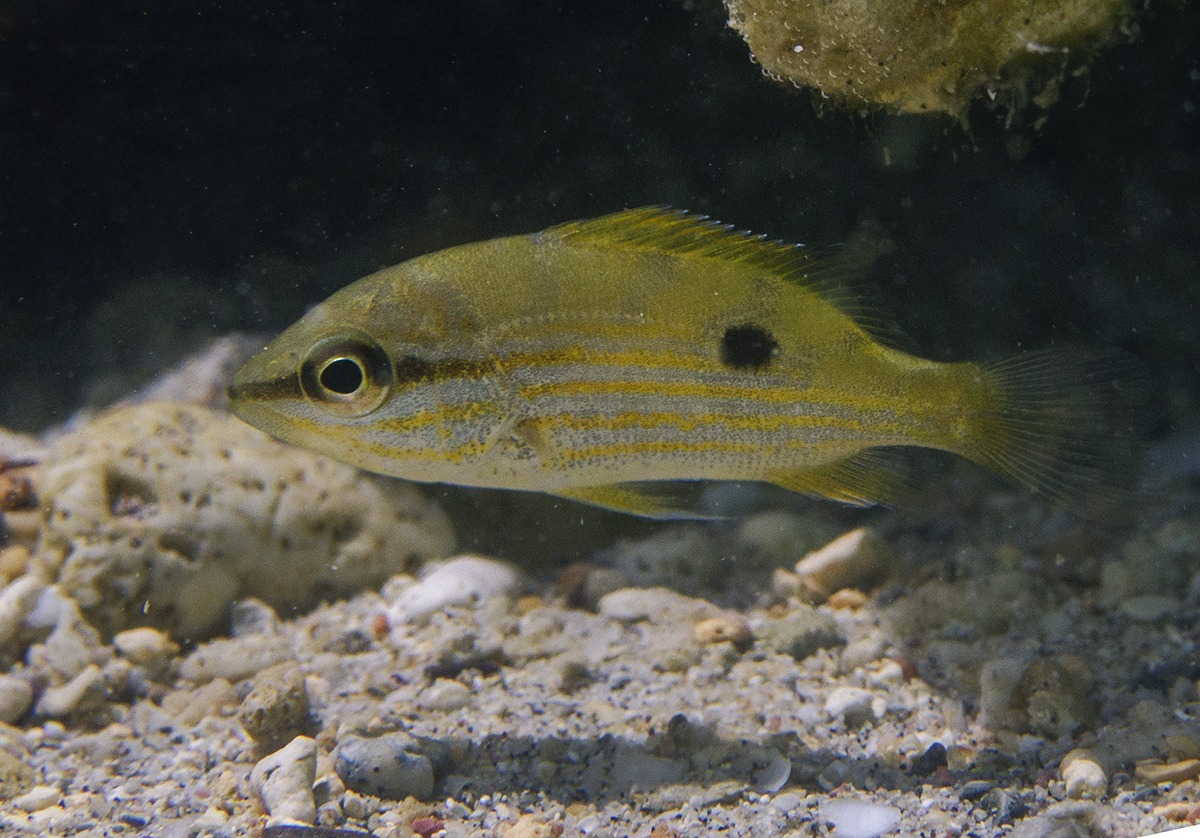
- juvenile

Conservation status
- Least Concern (IUCN 3.1)

Scientific classification
- Kingdom: Animalia
- Phylum: Chordata
- Class: Actinopterygii
- Order: Acanthuriformes
- Family: Lutjanidae
- Genus: Lutjanus
- Species: L. fulviflamma

Binomial name
- Lutjanus fulviflamma (Forsskål, 1775)

Synonyms
- Sciaena fulviflamma Forsskål, 1775; Lutjanus fulviflammus (Forsskål, 1775); Centropomus hober Lacépède, 1802; Lutjanus unimaculatus Quoy & Gaimard, 1824; Mesoprion aurolineatus Cuvier, 1829; Mesoprion terubuan Montrouzier, 1857; Mesoprion aureovittatus Macleay, 1879

= Lutjanus fulviflamma =

Species of fish

Lutjanus fulviflamma, the dory snapper, blackspot snapper, black-spot sea perch, finger-mark bream, long-spot snapper, Moses perch or red bream, is a species of marine ray-finned fish belonging to the family Lutjanidae, the snappers. It has a wide Indo-Pacific distribution.

== Taxonomy ==
Lutjanus fulviflamma was first formally described in 1775 as Sciaena fulviflamma by the Swedish speaking Finnish born explorer and naturalist Peter Forsskål with the type locality given as the Red Sea. The specific name, fulviflamma, is a compound of fulvus which means "brownish yellow", although it is frequently used to mean just yellow, and flamma which means "fire". The name was not explained but may be a reference to the vivid yellow upper body and tail which is visible on some individuals.

== Description ==
Lutjanus fulviflamma has a body which varies in shape from moderately deep to relatively slender with a standard length which is 2.5 to 2.9 times its depth, with a head which is not very steeply sloped. The incision and the knob on the preoperculum are not well developed. The vomerine teeth may be arranged in a triangular patch with a posterior extension or in a rhombus and there is a patch of grain-like teeth on the tongue. The dorsal fin has 10 spines and 12-14 soft rays while the anal fin contains 3 spines and 8 soft rays. The rear part of the dorsal and anal fins vary in shape from rounded to rather angular. The pectoral fins contain 15 to 17 rays and the caudal fin can be truncate or slightly emarginate. This fish attains a maximum total length of 35 cm (14 in), although 30 cm (12 in) is more typical. This snapper has a pale coloured body marked with 5-7 narrow yellow horizontal stripes of equal width on the flanks, the longest of these extends through the eye on to the snout. There is a quadrilateral black spot on the lateral line three-quarters of the distance between the head and the caudal fin.

== Distribution and habitat ==
Lutjanus fulviflamma has a wide Indo Pacific distribution. It occurs in the Red Sea from the Gulf of Suez and Gulf of Aqaba south along the eastern African coast as far south as eastern South Africa and eastwards through the Indian Ocean, including the Persian Gulf, into the Pacific Ocean as far easy as Samoa. They reach as far north as the Ryukyu Islands of southern Japan and south to northern Australia. There is also a single record from the Mediterranean Sea, from Malta, which had an eastern African origin as phylogenetic analysis showed.

They occur at depths between 0.5 and 35 m (1 ft 8 in and 114 ft 10 in) and in a number of different habitats with the juvenils occasionally frequenting in brackish lagoons and estuaries while the adults normally form schools over coral reefs and in deeper lagoons.

== Biology ==
Lutjanus fulviflamma frequently forms large mixed species schools with the bluestripe snapper (Lutjanus kasmira) and the bigeye snapper (Lutjanus lutjanus) as adults. They are predators which feed on fishes and crustaceans. Off eastern Africa and New Caledonia spawning takes place in the Spring and Summer from August to March. In the western Indian Ocean there is an extended spawning period from November and December to April and May. They are discontinuous spawners in which the females lay between 51,000 and 460,000 eggs in batches during a season, although batch sizes have yet to be ascertained.

== Fisheries ==
Lutjanus fulviflamma is a common target species for subsistence fisheries and frequently appears in fish markets, typically fresh. It is caught mostly with handlines, traps and gill nets. In the Persian Gulf this species is particularly important in Abu Dhabi as part of the Emirates coastal demersal fishery and is taken utilising intertidal fence nets and dome shaped wire traps. The dory snapper is also targeted as an important commercial quarry in the inshore waters of Tanzania.
