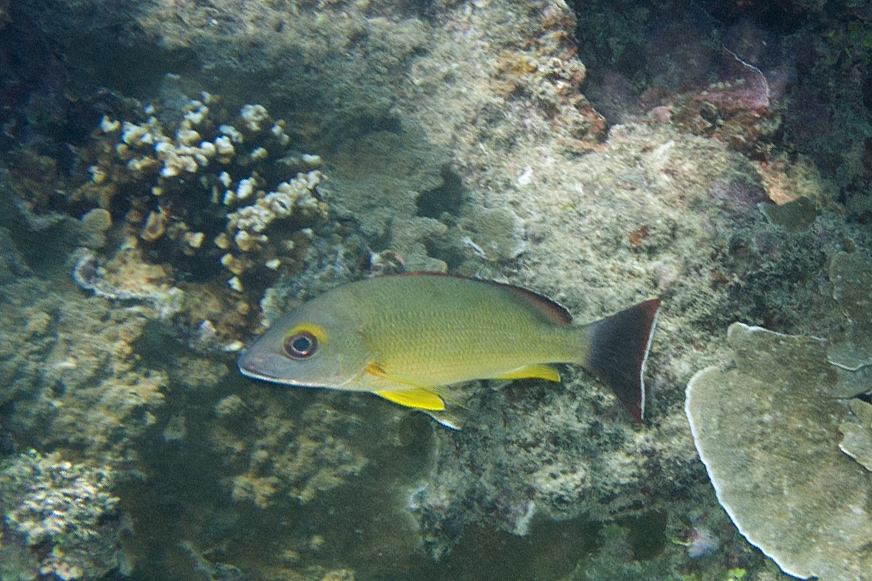

Conservation status
- Least Concern (IUCN 3.1)

Scientific classification
- Kingdom: Animalia
- Phylum: Chordata
- Class: Actinopterygii
- Order: Acanthuriformes
- Family: Lutjanidae
- Genus: Lutjanus
- Species: L. fulvus

Binomial name
- Lutjanus fulvus (Forster, 1801)

Synonyms
- Holocentrus fulvus Forster, 1801; Diacope vaigiensis Quoy & Gaimard, 1824; Lutjanus vaigiensis (Quoy & Gaimard, 1824); Diacope marginata Cuvier, 1828; Lutjanus marginatus (Cuvier, 1828); Diacope immaculata Cuvier, 1828; Serranus limbatus Valenciennes, 1828; Diacope xanthopus Cuvier, 1829; Diacope flavipes Valenciennes, 1830; Diacope aurantiaca Valenciennes, 1830; Diacope analis Valenciennes, 1830; Mesoprion argenteus Hombron & Jacquinot, 1853; Mesoprion maus Montrouzier, 1857; Mesoprion gaimardi Bleeker, 1859; Mesoprion kagoshimana Döderlein, 1883; Mesoprion marginipinnis Macleay, 1883; Genyoroge nigricauda De Vis, 1884; Lutianus marginatoides Kendall & Goldsborough, 1911

= Lutjanus fulvus =

Species of fish

Lutjanus fulvus, the blacktail snapper, flametail snapper, redmargined seaperch, Waigeu snapper or yellowmargined sea perch, is a species of marine ray-finned fish, a snapper belonging to the family Lutjanidae. It is native to the Indo-West Pacific region. It is an important species for fisheries within its range.

== Taxonomy ==
Lutjanus fulvus was first formally described in 1801 as Holocentrus fulvus by the German speaking Polish born naturalist Johan Reinhold Forster with the type locality given as Ota-haitee, which is Tahiti. Forster's description was published in Systema Ichthyologiae by Marcus Elieser Bloch and Johann Gottlob Schneider, and the description is sometimes attributed to either Bloch & Scheider or to Schneider. The specific name, fulvus which means "brownish yellow", a reference to the overall tan or brownish to pale yellow-white colour of the body.

== Description ==
Lutjanus filvus has a body which has a standard length that is around four times its depth. It has a steeply sloped forehead and a well developed known and notch in the preoperculum. The vomerine teeth are arranged in a crescent shaped patch with no rearwards extension and the tongue is smooth, lacking any teeth. The dorsal fin has 10 spines and 14 soft rays while the anal fin has 3 spines and 8 soft rays, the rear profile of both these fins is rounded. The pectoral fins contain 16 rays and the caudal fin is slightly emarginate. This fish attains a maximum total length of 40 cm (16 in), although 25 cm (9.8 in) is more typical. This species has an overall colour which ranges from orange-brown or brownish to pale yellowish or whitish. The dark reddish to blackish dorsal and caudal fins have a white margin, the anal fin, pectoral and pelvic fins are yellow. The scales have brownish to yellow margins, and there is a yellow patch over the eye. The juveniles are marked with yellowish horizontal stripes and have a black band just underneath the margin of the dorsal fin.

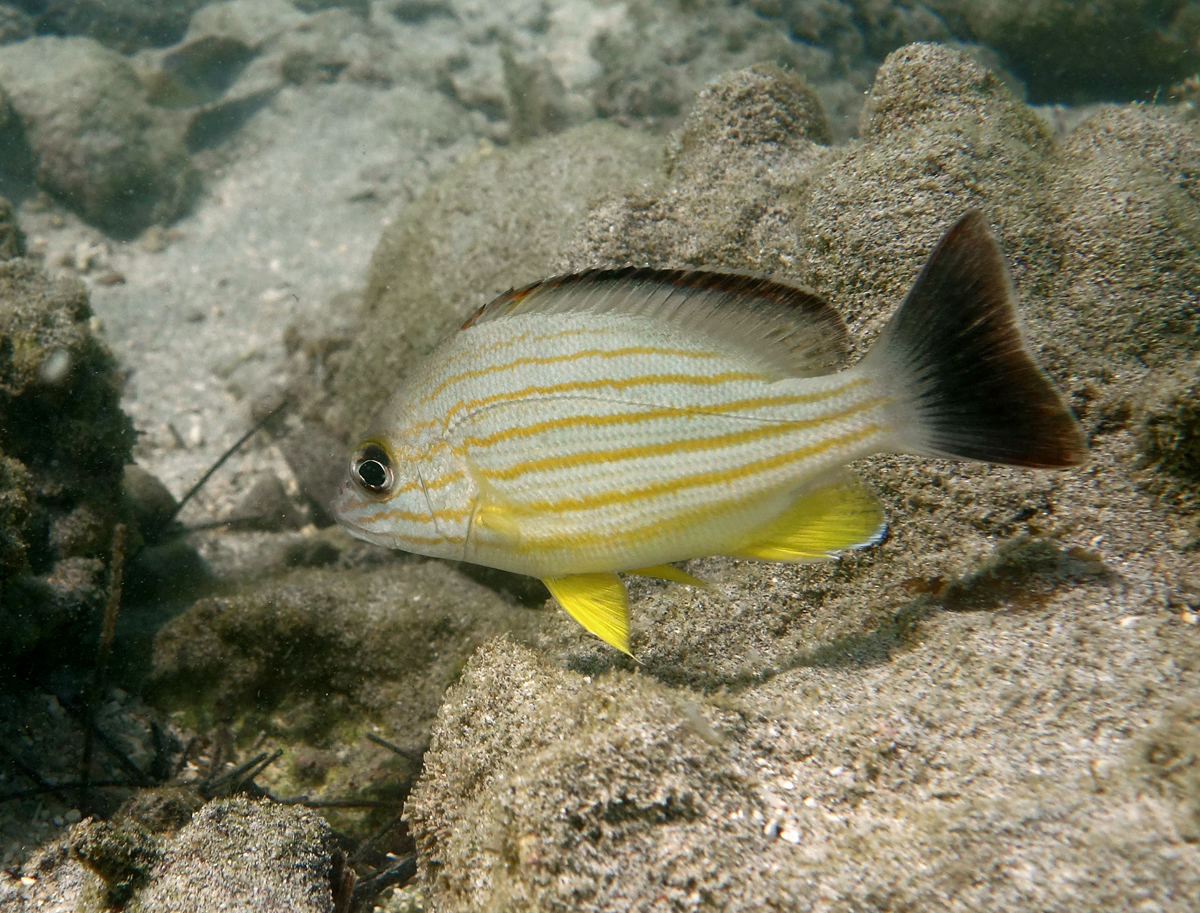
Juvenile in Réunion

== Distribution and habitat ==
Lutjanus fulvus has a wide Indo Pacific distribution. It is found from the Gulf of Aden and East Africa south to South Africa through the Indian Ocean but it is absent from the Persian Gulf, east as far as the Marquesas and the Line Islands. It occurs north to southern Japan and south to Australia. In Australia it is found from the Scott Reef of Western Australia, and the Ashmore Reef in the Timor Sea to Sydney, they also occur at Christmas Island and Cocos (Keeling) Islands, as well as Norfolk Island in the Tasman Sea. During the 1950s the Hawaiian Division of Fish and Game released blacktail snappers into Pearl Harbor and off Oahu and it is now found throughout the Hawaiian archipelago but it is nowhere abundant. They have a depth range of 2 to 75 m (6 ft 7 in to 246 ft 1 in) and can be found in lagoons and semi-sheltered seaward reefs. This species was one of the first to re-colonise an area of reef which had been recently dredged off Pohnpei. It shows a preference for sheltered areas where there are deep holes or large boulders. The juveniles are occasionally recorded in shallow mangrove swamps and in the lower reaches of freshwater streams.

== Biology ==
Lutjanus fulvus is a nocturnal predator of fishes, crustaceans, holothurians and cephalopods. A study in the Yaeyama Islands of Japan found that the oldest individual was 34 years old and most of the population were older than 3 years old. The mean length at sexual maturity was 22.5 cm (8.9 in), around 4 years old for females and 20.7 cm (8.1 in), around 3 years old, for males. They were thought to spawn there between April and October.

== Fisheries ==
Lutjanus fulvus is commonly recorded in markets, normally as fresh fish. Fishers catch it using handlines, traps and gillnets. Consumption of this species has been known to cause ciguatera poisoning, especially in the Pacific. The blacktail snapper is among the most important fishes which are taken by gill netting and handlining in Kiribati and it is regarded as a commercial species in the Ryukyu Islands of Japan. The introduction of this species to Hawaii was intended to supplement the commercially exploited reef fish there.
