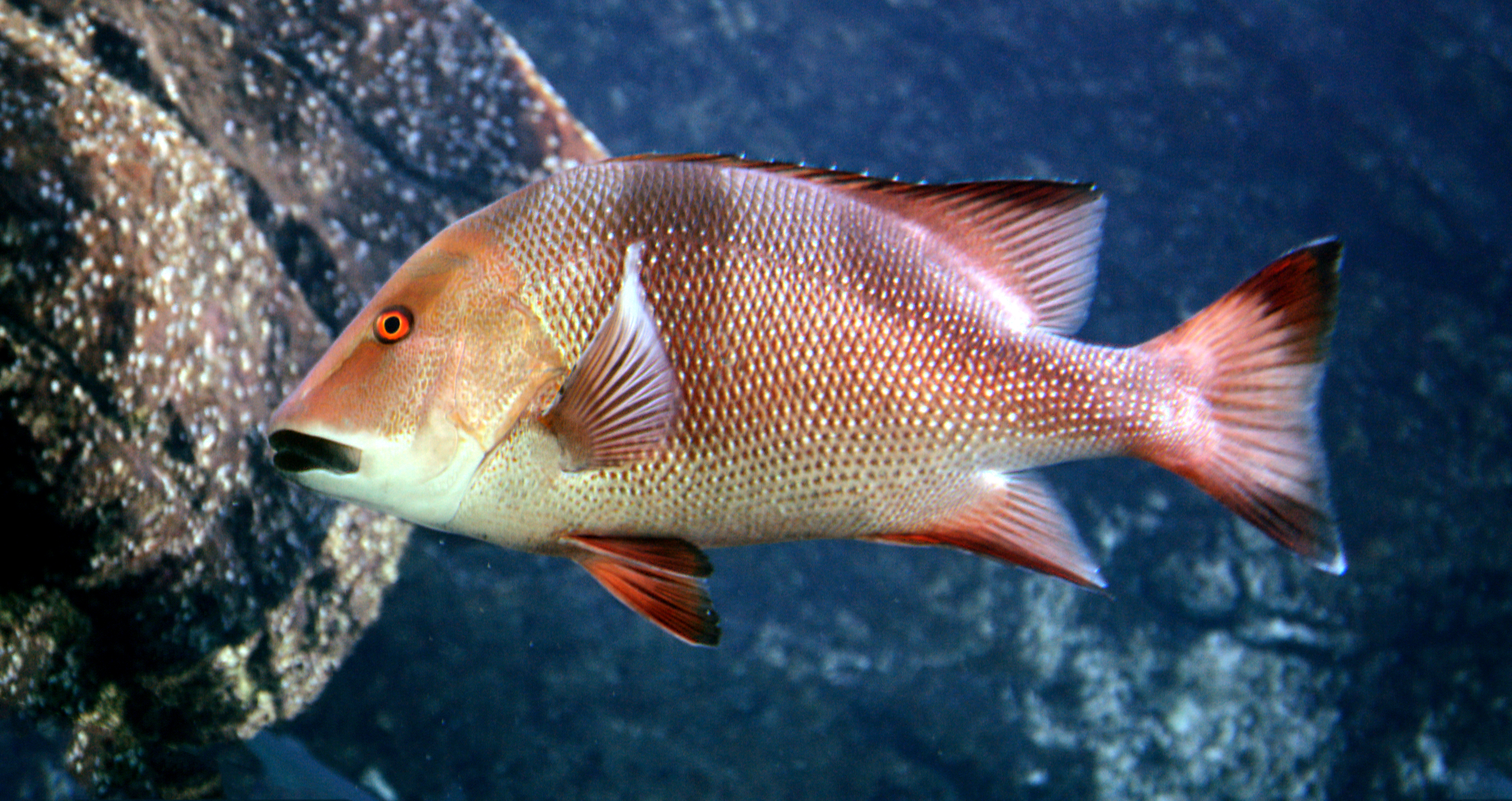
- At uShaka Marine World, Durban

Conservation status
- Least Concern (IUCN 3.1)

Scientific classification
- Kingdom: Animalia
- Phylum: Chordata
- Class: Actinopterygii
- Order: Acanthuriformes
- Family: Lutjanidae
- Genus: Lutjanus
- Species: L. sebae

Binomial name
- Lutjanus sebae (G. Cuvier, 1816)

Synonyms
- Diacope sebae G. Cuvier, 1816; Diacope siamensis Valenciennes, 1830; Diacope civis Valenciennes, 1831; Genyoroge regia De Vis, 1884

= Lutjanus sebae =

Species of fish

Lutjanus sebae, also known as red emperor, emperor red snapper, emperor snapper, government bream, king snapper, queenfish or red kelp, is a species of marine ray-finned fish, a snapper belonging to the family Lutjanidae. It is native to the Indian Ocean and the western Pacific Ocean.

== Taxonomy ==
Lutjanus sebae was first formally described in 1816 as Diacope sebae by the French zoologist Georges Cuvier, Cuvier did not give a type locality but it is thought to be either the Coromandel Coast of India or so where in Indonesia. The specific name honours Albertus Seba, a Dutch pharmacist, zoologist and natural history collector, who published a Thesaurus of animal specimens with beautiful engravings in 1734. This included examples of marine life from the Indo-Pacific, including an illustration of the emperor red snapper.

== Description ==
Lutjanus sebae has a very deep body, its standard length being just over twice its depth. The forehead is steeply sloped, the snout has a straight or convex upper profile and the knob and incision on the preopercle are moderately developed. The vomerine teeth are arranged in a crescent shaped or triangular patch with no rearwards extension and there no teeth on the smooth tongue. The dorsal fin has 11 spines and 15-16 soft rays and the anal fin has 3 spines and 10 soft rays, the rear of the dorsal and anal fins is very pointed. The pectoral fins contain 17 rays and the caudal fin is weakly forked. This species attains a maximum total length of 116 cm (46 in), although 60 cm (24 in) is more typical, and the maximum published weight is 32.7 kg (72 lb). The overall colour of this fish is reddish to pink with red fins. Juveniles and subadults show a band of dark red band starting at the snout tip running through the eye up to the anteriormost spine in the dorsal fin, a wide band then runs from the middle of the spiny part of the dorsal fin to the pelvic fin, and an oblique band runs from the tip of the rearmost dorsal fin spine to the ventral lobe of the caudal fin.

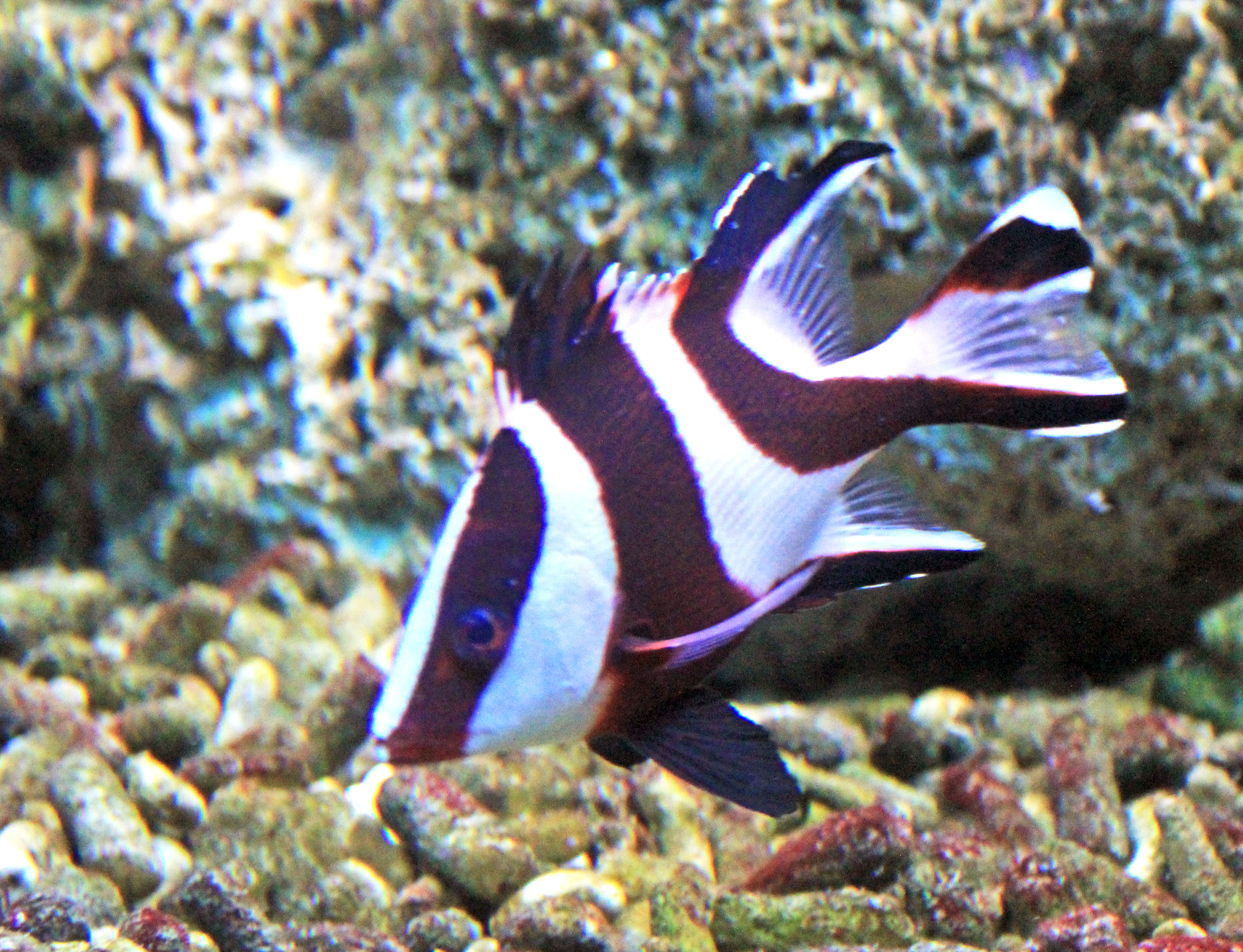
Juvenile

== Distribution and habitat ==
Lutjanus sebae has a wide Indo-Pacific distribution from Eastern Africa where its range extends from the southern Red Sea to South Africa east into the Pacific Ocean as far as New Caledonia, south to Australia and north to southern Japan. In Australian waters this species can be found from Bunbury, Western Australia around the coast to Sydney. It has been reported twice recently in the Mediterranean Sea, near Athens, Greece, and Palermo, Sicily.

This species is an inhabitant of both rocky and coral reefs, preferring flat areas with either a sandy or gravel substrate.

== Biology ==
Lutjanus sebae is a predatory fish which feeds on different fish, benthic crustaceans and cephalopods. It aggregates into schools with similar sized individuals or they will be solitary. This is a slow growing species, off the Seychelles, the mean age of first sexual maturity for both males and females was estimated at 9 year old. The size at which 50% of fishes are sexually mature was between fork lengths of 61 and 63 cm (24 and 25 in). Once they are sexually mature the females growth rate decreases compared to the males, and adult males grow larger than females. Red emperor snappers form spawning aggregations between October and April, eggs and milt are broadcast in these aggregations. They are long lived, maximum longevity is as much as 40 years. Juveniles have been observed swimming among the spines of sea urchins. The larger adults move to deeper waters but frequently return to shallower water in the winter.

== Fisheries ==
Lutjanus sebae is commercially important and is also farmed. It is sought as a game fish and is found in the aquarium trade.

== In culture ==
Lutjanus sebae is also known as the government bream in Australasia, for the red bars on the juvenile form suggesting the fish is wrapped in red tape.

== Gallery ==
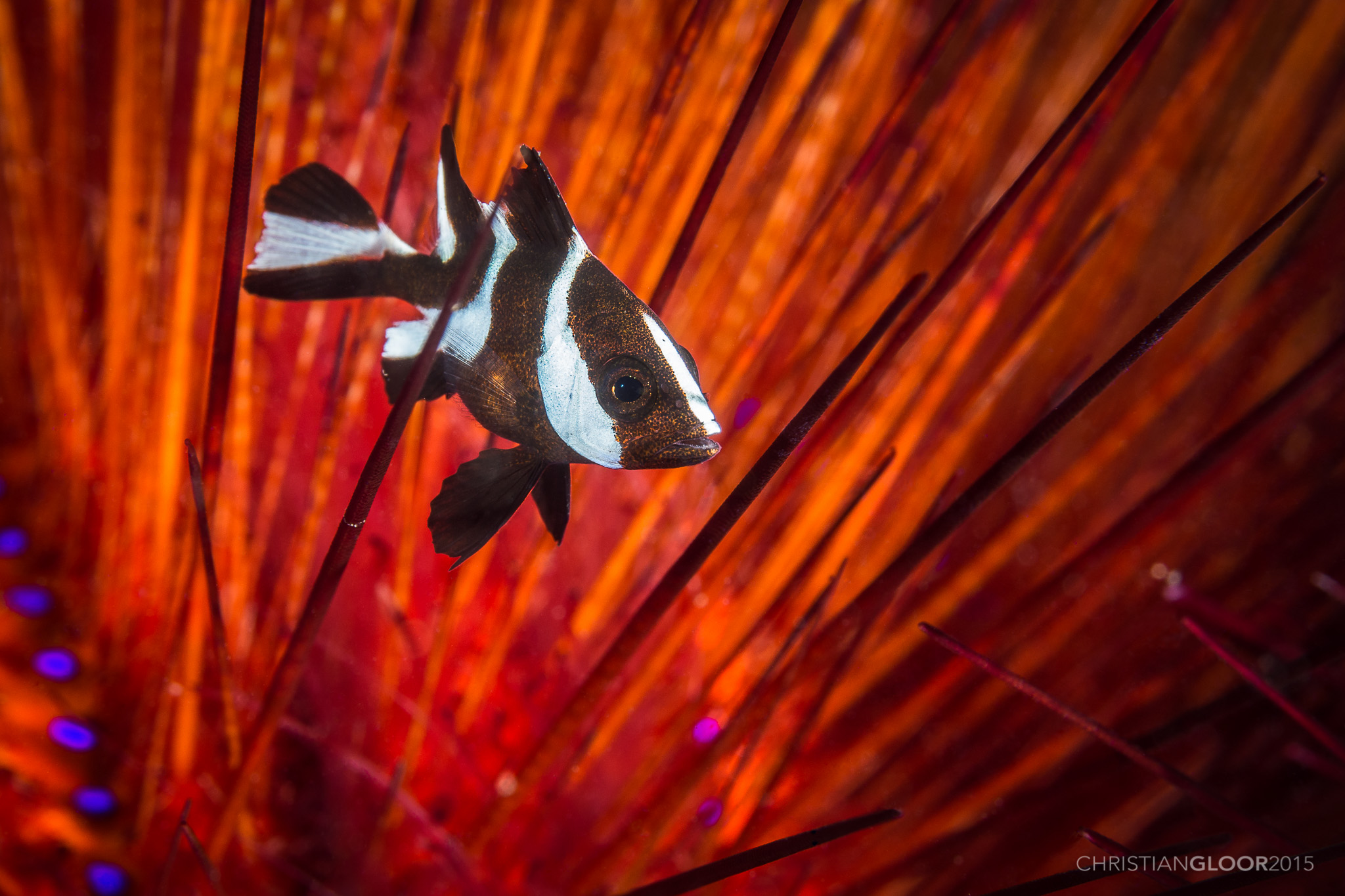
Lutjanus sebae at Wakatobi National Park Sulawesi, 2015

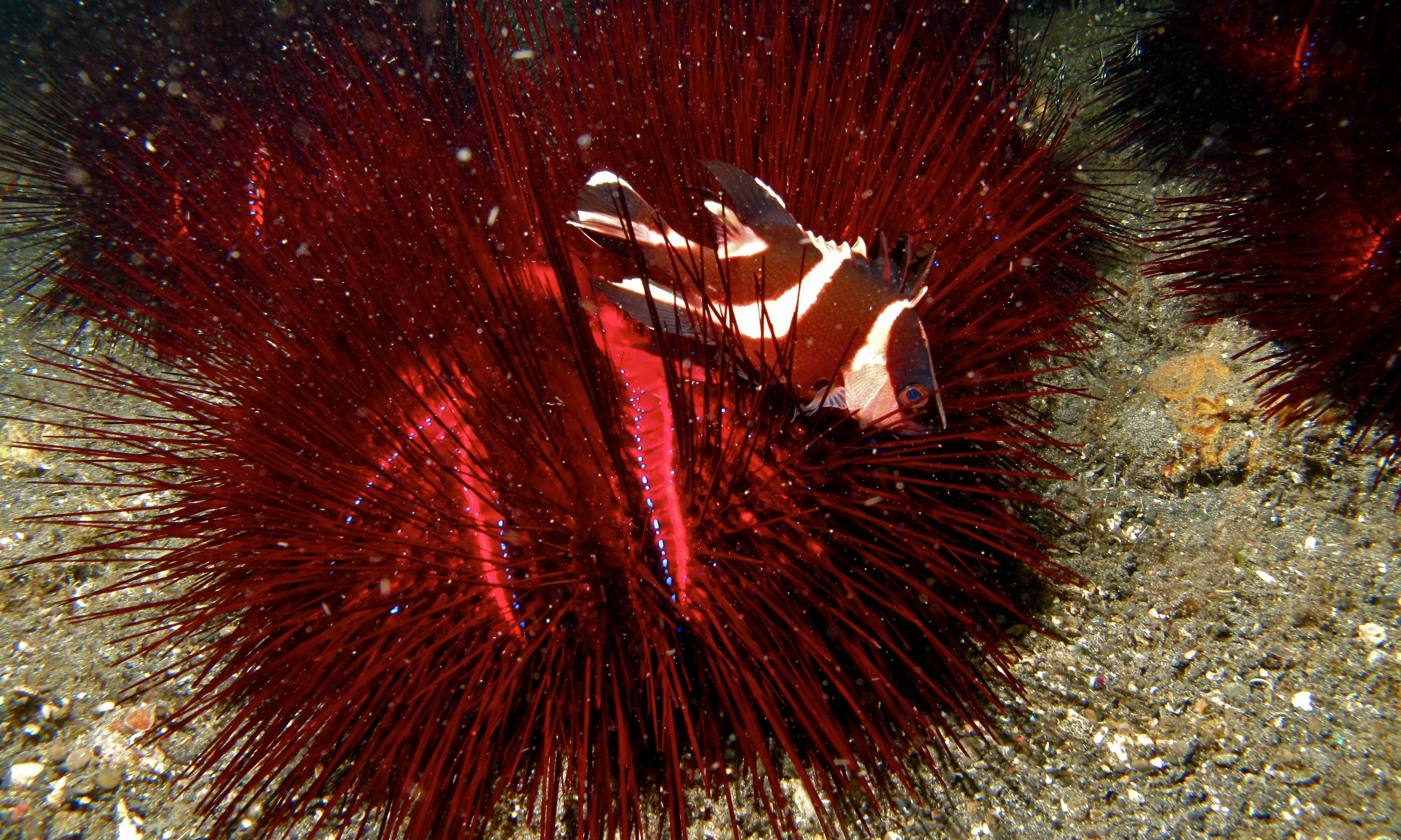
Lutjanus sebae at Lembeh Strait Sulawesi, 2009

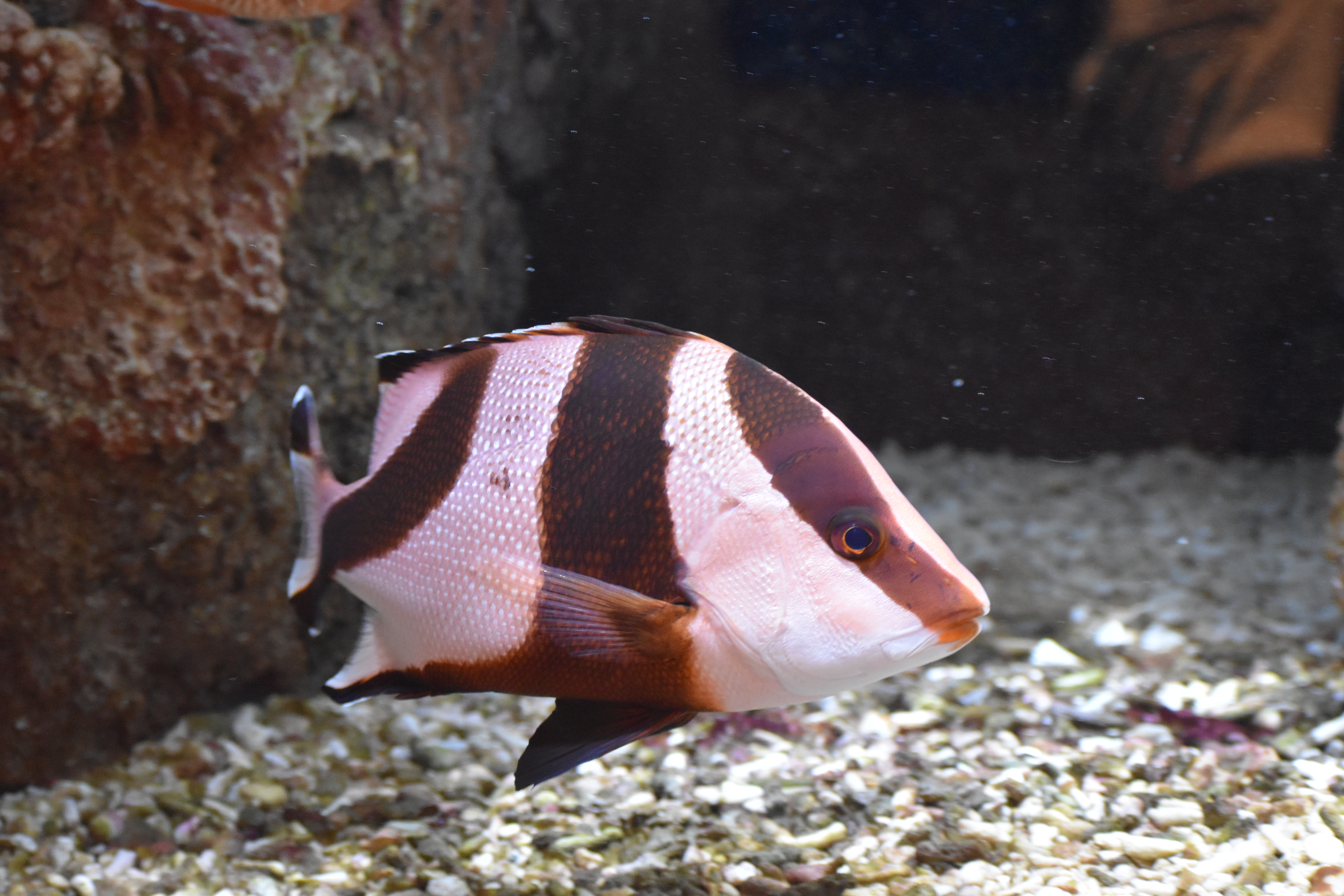
Lutjanus sebae

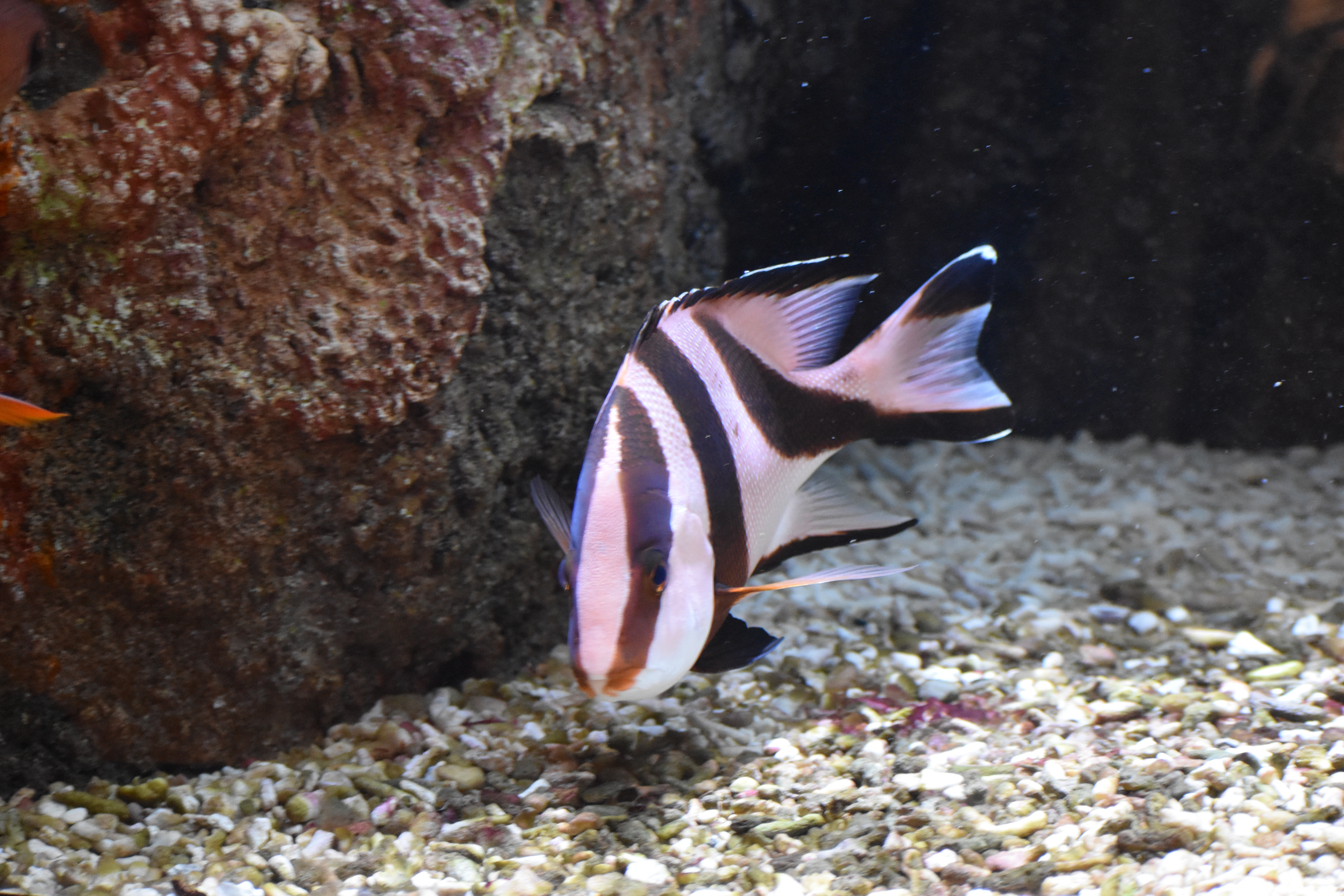
Lutjanus sebae

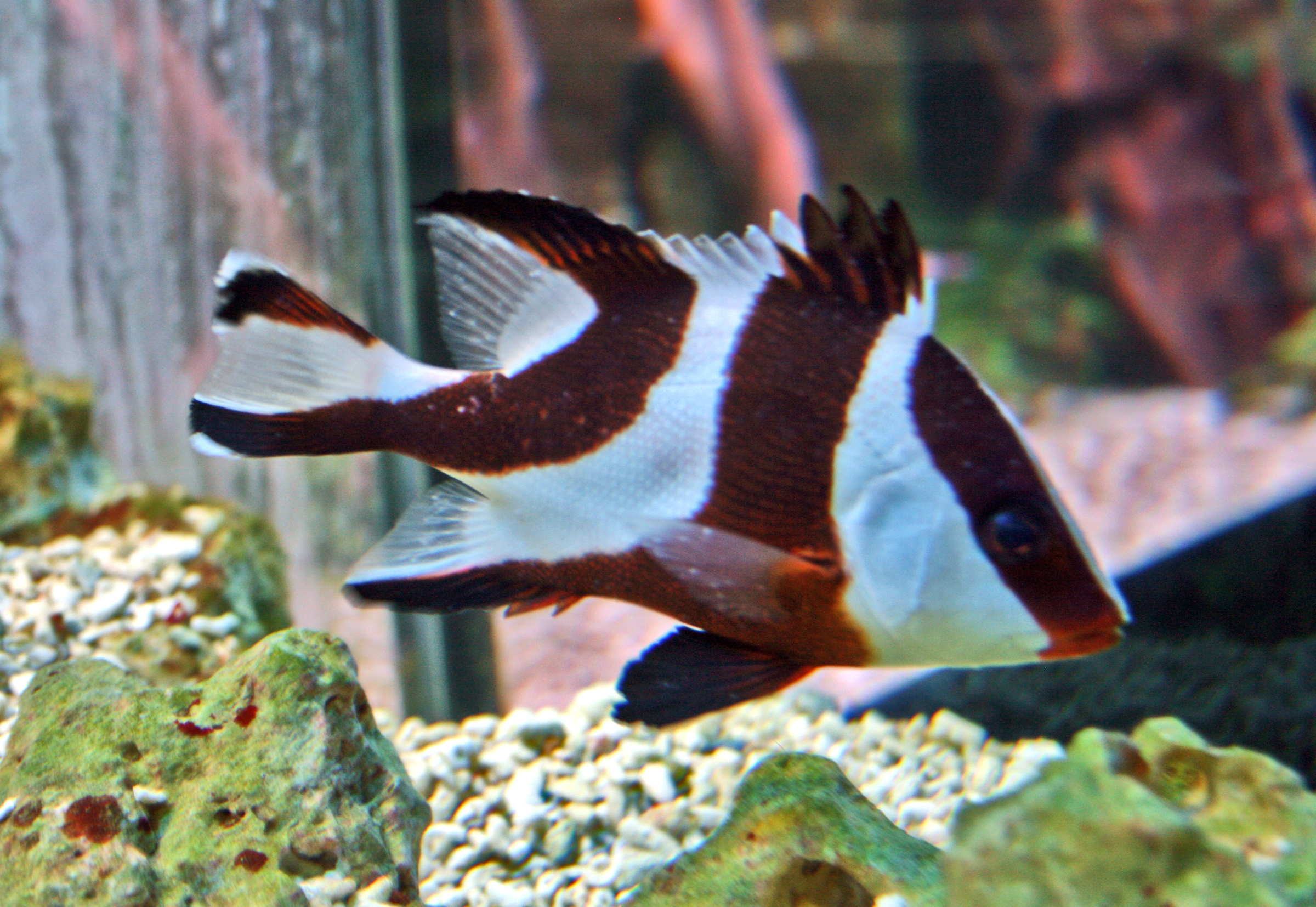
Lutjanus sebae in Prague sea aquarium "Sea world", Czech Republic
