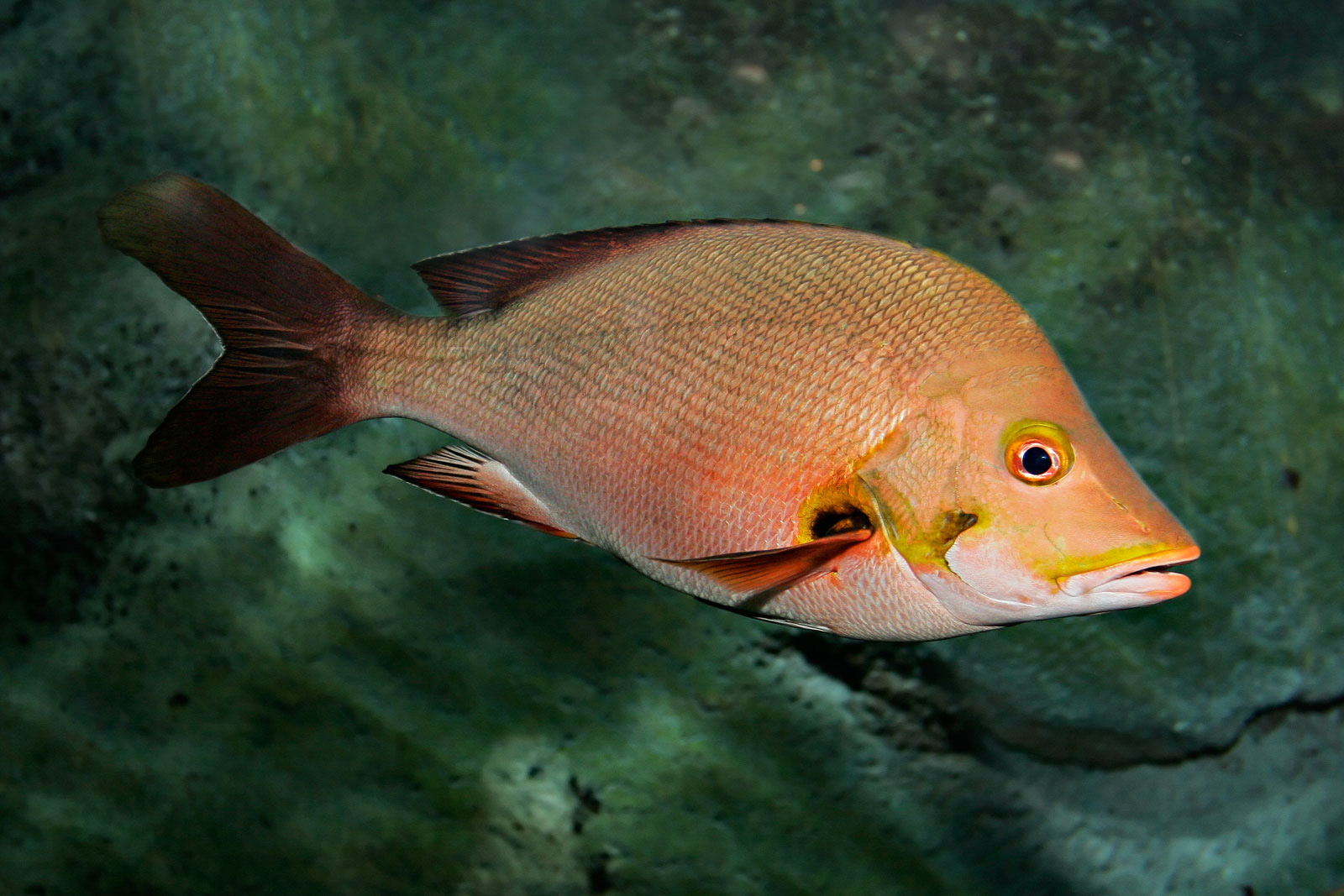
- Adult at Sea Life Melbourne Aquarium
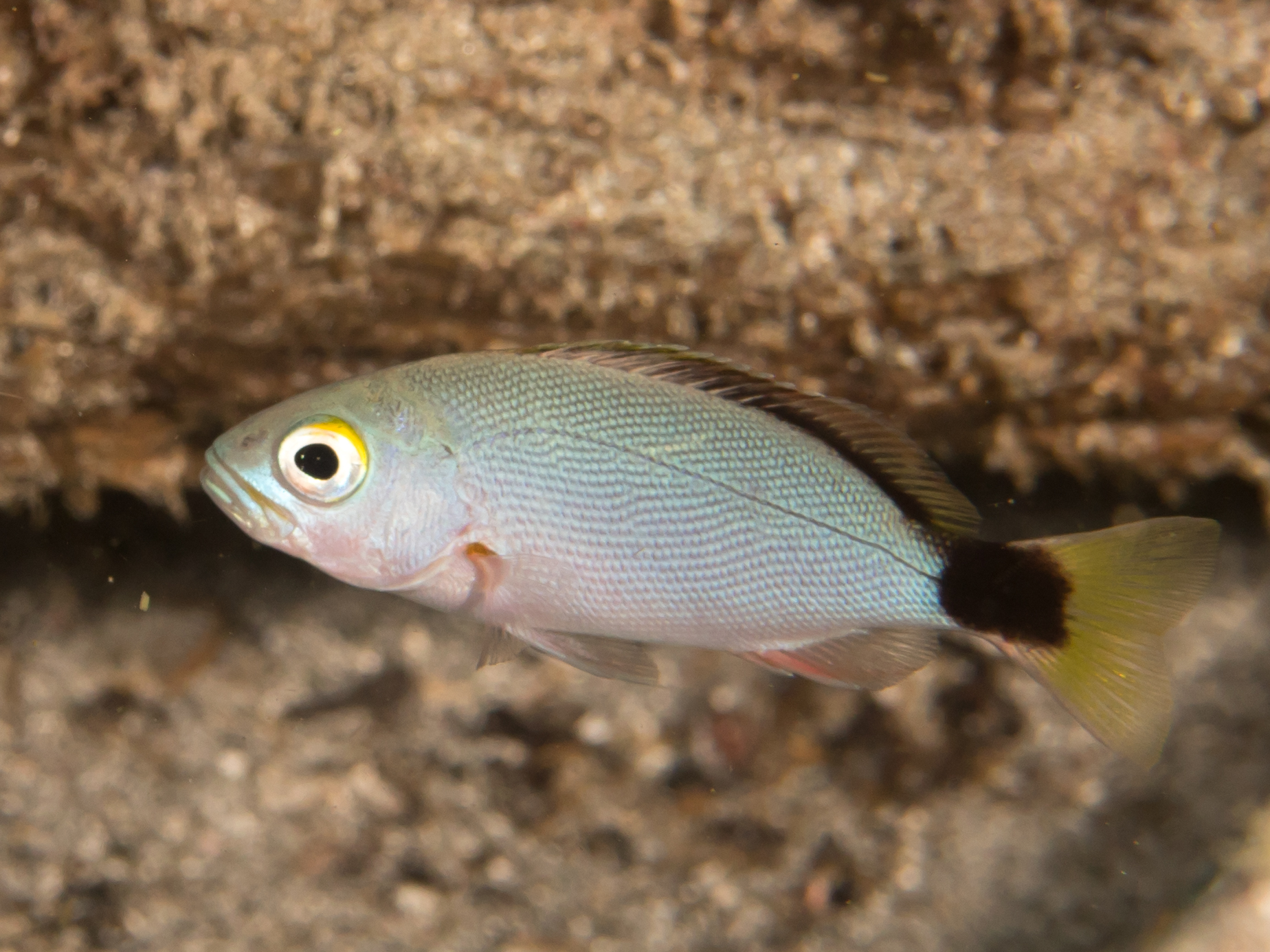
- Juvenile at Morotai, Indonesia

Conservation status
- Least Concern (IUCN 3.1)

Scientific classification
- Kingdom: Animalia
- Phylum: Chordata
- Class: Actinopterygii
- Order: Acanthuriformes
- Family: Lutjanidae
- Genus: Lutjanus
- Species: L. gibbus

Binomial name
- Lutjanus gibbus (Forsskål, 1775)

Synonyms
- Sciaena gibba Forsskål, 1775; Diacope lineata Quoy & Gaimard, 1824; Diacope borensis G. Cuvier, 1828; Diacope coccinea G. Cuvier, 1828; Lutjanus coccineus (G. Cuvier, 1828); Diacope striata G. Cuvier, 1828; Diacope rosea Valenciennes, 1830; Diacope axillaris Valenciennes, 1830; Diacope tiea Lesson, 1831; Diacope melanura Rüppell, 1838; Mesoprion janthinurus Bleeker, 1854; Genyoroge bidens W. J. Macleay, 1882; Lutianus tahitiensis Seale, 1906; Anthias heraldi L. P. Schultz, 1953; Lutjanus comoriensis Fourmanoir, 1957

= Humpback red snapper =

Species of fish

The humpback red snapper (Lutjanus gibbus), the paddletail, paddletail snapper or hunchback snapper, is a species of marine ray-finned fish, a snapper belonging to the family Lutjanidae. It has a wide Indo-West Pacific distribution. It is a commercially important species, as well as being sought after as a game fish. It is also a popular species for display in public aquaria. It has been reported to cause ciguatera poisoning.

== Taxonomy ==
The Humpback red snapper was first formally described in 1775 as Sciaena gibba by the Swedish speaking Finnish born explorer and naturalist Peter Forsskål with the type locality given as the Red Sea. The specific name, gibbus means "humpbacked", a reference to high, steep dorsal profile on the head of the adults.

== Description ==
Humpback red snapper has a body which is relatively with a standard length which is 2.2 to 2.5 times its depth, with a head which has a very steeply sloped forehead a well developed known and notch in the preoperculum. The vomerine teeth are arranged in a crescent shaped patch with no rearwards extension and the tongue is smooth, lacking any teeth. The dorsal fin has 10 spines and 13–14 soft rays while the anal fin contains 3 spines and 8 soft rays. The rear part of the dorsal and anal fins are pointed in shape. The pectoral fins contain 16 to 17 rays and the caudal fin is forked with rounded lobes. This fish attains a maximum total length of 50 cm (20 in), although 45 cm (18 in) is more typical. The overall colour of this snapper is red or grey, darker on back and upper head. There is an orange tint on the lower part of gill cover and on the axil of the pectoral fin. The fins may be red but the median fins are normally dark brown to blackish with the soft-rayed part of the dorsal fin, the anal fin and the caudal fin having a thin white margin. The juveniles have a sizeable circular black spot at base of caudal fin.

== Distribution and habitat ==
Lutjanus gibbus ha a wide Indo-West Pacific distribution. It ranges from the eastern African coast and the Red Sea to the Society and Line islands and from Australia in the south to southern Japan in the north. It has also been recorded from the Marquesas and south to Rapa Iti. In Australia it is found from Houtman Abrolhos to the Dampier Archipelago and reefs off the northern coast of Western Australia, the Ashmore Reef in the Timor Sea the on the eastern coast from the outer Great Barrier Reef and Coral Sea reefs south to Moreton Bay in Queensland with juveniles occurring south to Sydney. The humpback red snapper occurs at depths from 1 to 150 m (3 ft 3 in to 492 ft 2 in). It is associated with reefs and during the day gathers in large, mostly stationary aggregations on coral reefs. The juveniles shelter in beds of sea grass in protected areas of sandy and muddy substrates, while the aggregations are dominated by subadults. The larger adults inhabit deeper waters on coastal slopes.

== Biology ==
The humpback red snapper feeds on fishes and invertebrates, such as shrimps, crabs, lobsters, stomatopods, cephalopods, echinoderms and ophiuroids. Off East Africa most spawning takes place during the spring and summer. Sexual maturity occurs at two and a half years old and they form spawning aggregations.

== Fisheries ==
The humpback red snapper catch in 2010 was estimated at 3,100 t (3,100 long tons; 3,400 short tons), of which 2,500 t (2,500 long tons; 2,800 short tons) are unreported. It is an important species for fisheries in Japan. It is taken mostly using handlines, traps, spearfishing, and gill nets. It is a common item in fish markets, normally being sold as fresh fish. In the Pacific part of its range consumption of this species has been linked to ciguatera poisoning.
