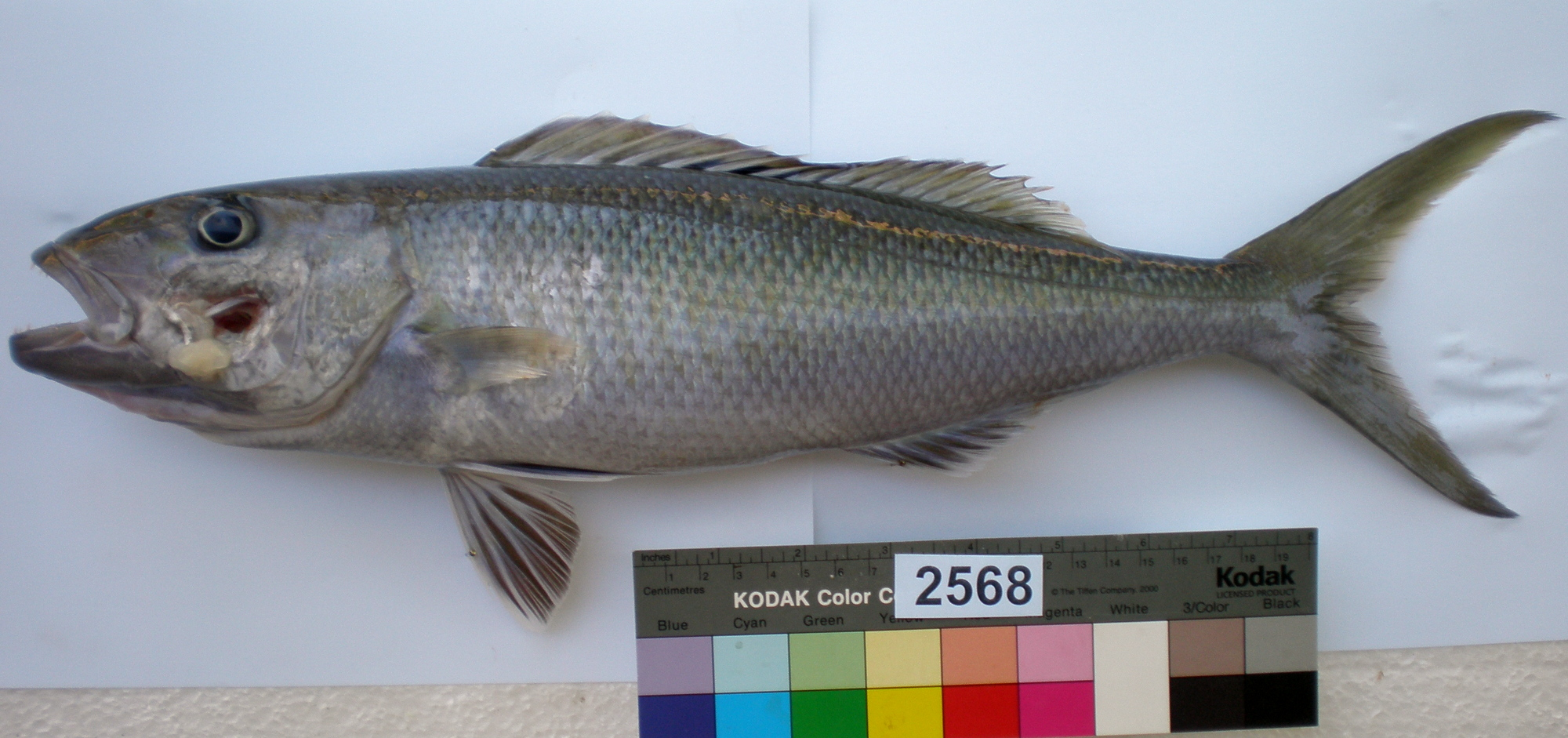

Conservation status
- Least Concern (IUCN 3.1)

Scientific classification
- Kingdom: Animalia
- Phylum: Chordata
- Class: Actinopterygii
- Order: Acanthuriformes
- Family: Lutjanidae
- Subfamily: Etelinae
- Genus: Aprion; Valenciennes, 1830
- Species: A. virescens

Binomial name
- Aprion virescens Valenciennes, 1830

Synonyms
- Aphareus virescens (Valenciennes, 1830); Mesoprion microchir Bleeker, 1853; Sparopsis latifrons Kner, 1868; Sparopsis elongatus Kner, 1868; Aprion kanekonis S. Tanaka, 1914

= Green jobfish =

Species of fish

The green jobfish (Aprion virescens), also known as the gray jobfish, gray snapper, or slender snapper, and in Hawaiian as uku, is a species of marine ray-finned fish, a snapper belonging to the family Lutjanidae. It is found in the Indo-Pacific region. This species inhabits various reef environments at depths from near the surface to 120 metres (390 ft). It is a very important species for local commercial fisheries and is popular as a game fish, though it has been reported to cause ciguatera poisoning. This species is the only known member of its genus.

== Description ==
The green jobfish is a robust fish with has an elongate body which is cylindrical in cross-section. The head is also elongate with a blunt snout, with an obvious longitudinal groove running from the snout to the eye and it has a deeply forked caudal fin. The teeth in the jaws are arranged in bands with 2 distinct canines at the front. The vomerine teeth are set out in a crescent shaped patch. The dorsal fin contains 10 spines and 11 soft rays while the anal fin has 3 spines and 8 soft rays. The overall colour of the body is dark green to bluish, fading towards the abdomen. The spiny part of the dorsal fin has black spots at the base of the five rearmost spines. This species attains a maximum total length of 112 cm (44 in), although 90 cm (35 in) is more typical, and a maximum published weight of 15.4 kg (34 lb).

== Distribution ==
The green jobfish has a wide Indo-Pacific distribution. It extends from the Red Sea and the eastern coast of Africa as far south as northeastern South Africa and across the Indian Ocean into the Pacific Ocean where it is found north to southern Japan, south to Australia and Rapa Iti and east to Hawaii. In Australia it occurs from Australian waters from northwestern Australia the Ningaloo Reef to Rowley Shoals, Scott Reef and Ashmore and Cartier Islands in the Timor Sea and from the northern Great Barrier Reef of Queensland south to Wooli in New South Wales. It is also found at Lord Howe Island, Middleton Reef, Christmas Island and Cocos (Keeling) Island.

== Habitat and biology ==
The green jobfish is a benthopelagic fish of open waters of deep lagoons, channels, or seaward reefs at depths from the surface down to 120 m (390 ft). It is typically encountered singly but they may aggregate into small schools. It diet is dominated by fishes but it is also known to feed on crustaceans, cephalopods and zooplankton. This species has been observed to spawn in May to October off Hawaii and it is known that they are multiple spawners. They reach sexual maturity at 4.5 years, when the females are around 40 cm (16 in) in length.

== Taxonomy ==
The green jobfish was first formally described in 1830 by the French zoologist Achille Valenciennes with the type locality given as the Seychelles. It is the only species in the genus Aprion. The generic name Aprion is a compound of a meaning "without" and prion meaning " saw", a reference to the unserrated preoperculum. The specific name virescens means "greenish" referring to the overall colour of the body.

== Fisheries ==
The green jobfish is considered to have good quality flesh and is an important part of some subsistence fisheries. It is commonly sold fresh in many fish markets, but also preserved by drying and salting. In Hawaii it is one of the four most important species of snapper for fisheries, one of the prime quarry fish for the handlines bottom fishery and it is managed as part of the bottom fish management unit. It is one of the most important quarry species throughout its range and in 2010 the catch was 2,350 t (2,310 long tons; 2,590 short tons). Larger individuals can be dangerous to eat because they are known to be a cause of ciguatera poisoning in humans. it is also a popular quarry in sports fishing and is sometimes found in the aquarium trade.
