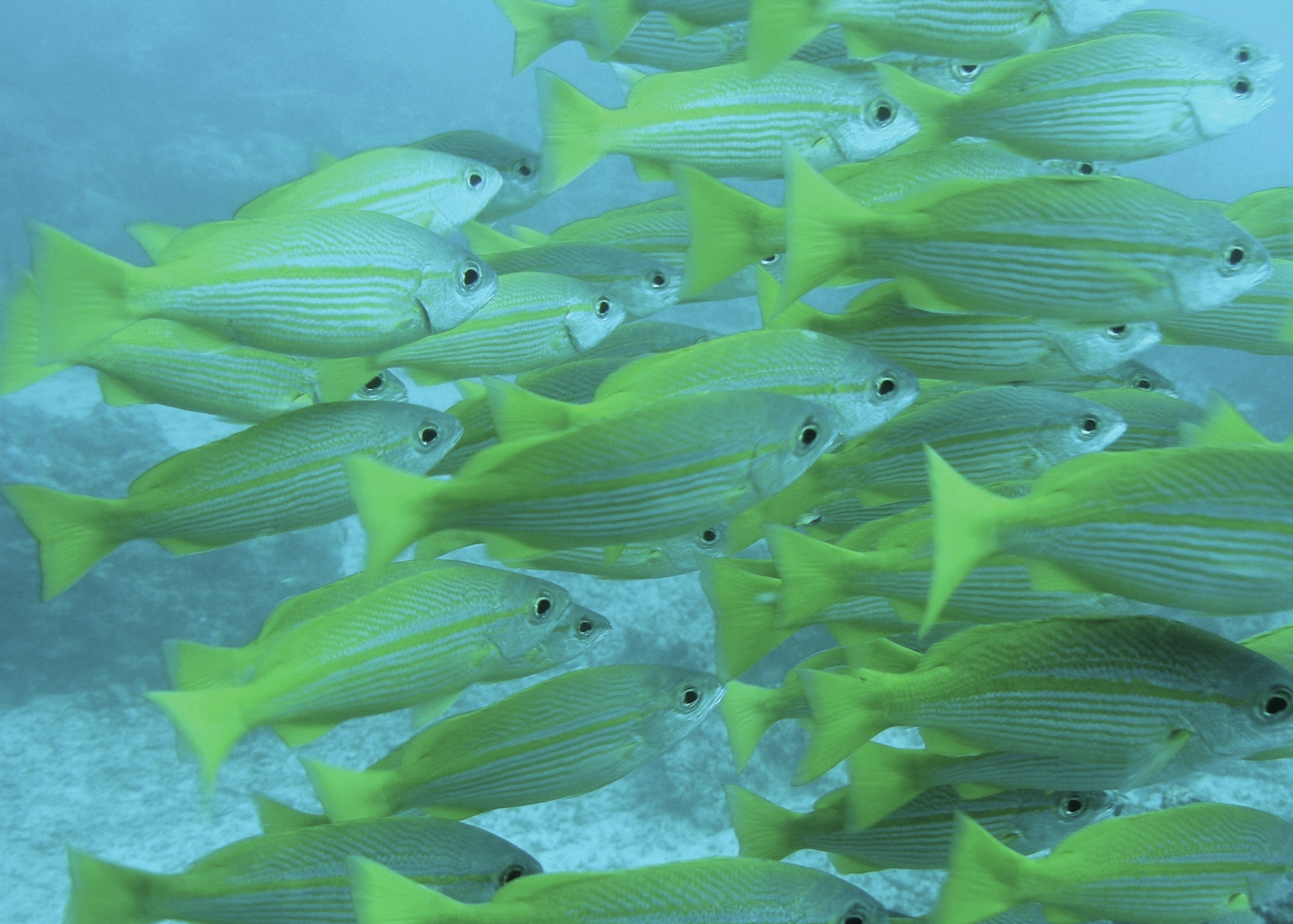

Conservation status
- Least Concern (IUCN 3.1)

Scientific classification
- Kingdom: Animalia
- Phylum: Chordata
- Class: Actinopterygii
- Order: Acanthuriformes
- Family: Lutjanidae
- Genus: Lutjanus
- Species: L. lutjanus

Binomial name
- Lutjanus lutjanus Bloch, 1790

Synonyms
- Lutjanus blochii Lacépède, 1802; Mesoprion caroui G. Cuvier, 1828; Serranus nouleny Valenciennes, 1828; Diacope lineolata Rüppell, 1829; Lutianus lineolatus (Rüppell, 1829); Lutjanus lineolatus (Rüppell, 1829); Mesoprion erythrognathus Valenciennes, 1831; Mesoprion xanthopterygius Bleeker, 1849; Rhomboplitoides megalops Fowler, 1918

= Bigeye snapper =

Species of fish

The bigeye snapper (Lutjanus lutjanus), also known as the bigeye seaperch, red sea lined snapper, golden striped snapper, rosy snapper, yellow snapper, or simply snapper, is a species of marine ray-finned fish, a snapper belonging to the family Lutjanidae. It is native to the Indian Ocean and the western Pacific Ocean. It is the type species of the genus Lutjanus.

== Taxonomy ==
The bigeye snapper was first formally described in 1790 by the German physician and zoologist Marcus Elieser Bloch with the type locality given as Japan, although this is thought to be erroneous and is actually Indonesia. Bloch named the genus Lutjanus when he described this species and it is the type species of that genus by tautonymy. The name, lutjanus, is derived from a local Indonesian name for snappers, ikhan Lutjang.

== Description ==
The bigeye snapper has a fusiform, slender body which has a standard length that is 2.9 to 3.3 as long as the body's deepest points. It has a gently sloped forehead and the preopercular incision and knob are weakly developed. The vomerine teeth are arranged in a triangular patch with a central rearwards extension and the tongue has a patch of grain-like teeth. The dorsal fin has 10-12 spines and 12 soft rays while the anal fin contains 3 spines and 8 soft rays. The rear of the dorsal fin and the anal fin have an angular profile, the pectoral fins have 16-17 rays and the caudal fin is truncate or weakly emarginate. This fish attains a maximum total length of 35 cm (14 in). The upper back is golden-brown in colour with silvery-white flanks with a brown to yellow stripe running from the snout to the dorsal caudal peduncle. It has oblique golden lines above the lateral line and horizontal stripes below it. The dorsal, anal and caudal fins are vivid yellow.

== Distribution and habitat ==
The bigeye snapper has a wide Indo-West Pacific distribution. It is found from the Red Sea and the eastern African coast as far south as South Africa and Madagascar east along the southern Asian coast, including the Seychelles, into the Pacific where it has been recorded from Tonga and Wallis Island. It extends north to Japan and south to Australia. In Australian waters it has been recorded from the coasts north-western Western Australia around the tropical northern coast to the northern coast of Queensland. It is found at depths between 1 and 96 m (3 ft 3 in and 315 ft 0 in) in areas of coral reef and inshore waters with soft substrates.

== Biology ==
The bigeye snapper is often observed in large aggregations with congeners. It is a predatory species which hunts fishes and crustaceans. They have been reported spawning in the Gulf of Aden in March, off eastern Africa in November and between January and June in the Gulf of Suez.

== Fisheries and conservation ==
The bigeye snapper caught using handlines and bottom trawls in some parts of its range, it is also caught as a bycatch in shrimp fisheries. The catch is sold fresh and it can be a common species in fish markets. Between 1979 and 1982 2,286 tonnes was reported to the FAO as being taken in the Gulf of Suez representing 10-20% of the annual snapper landings in that region. However, this species remains locally abundant and has stable populations so the IUCN have assessed it as Least Concern.
