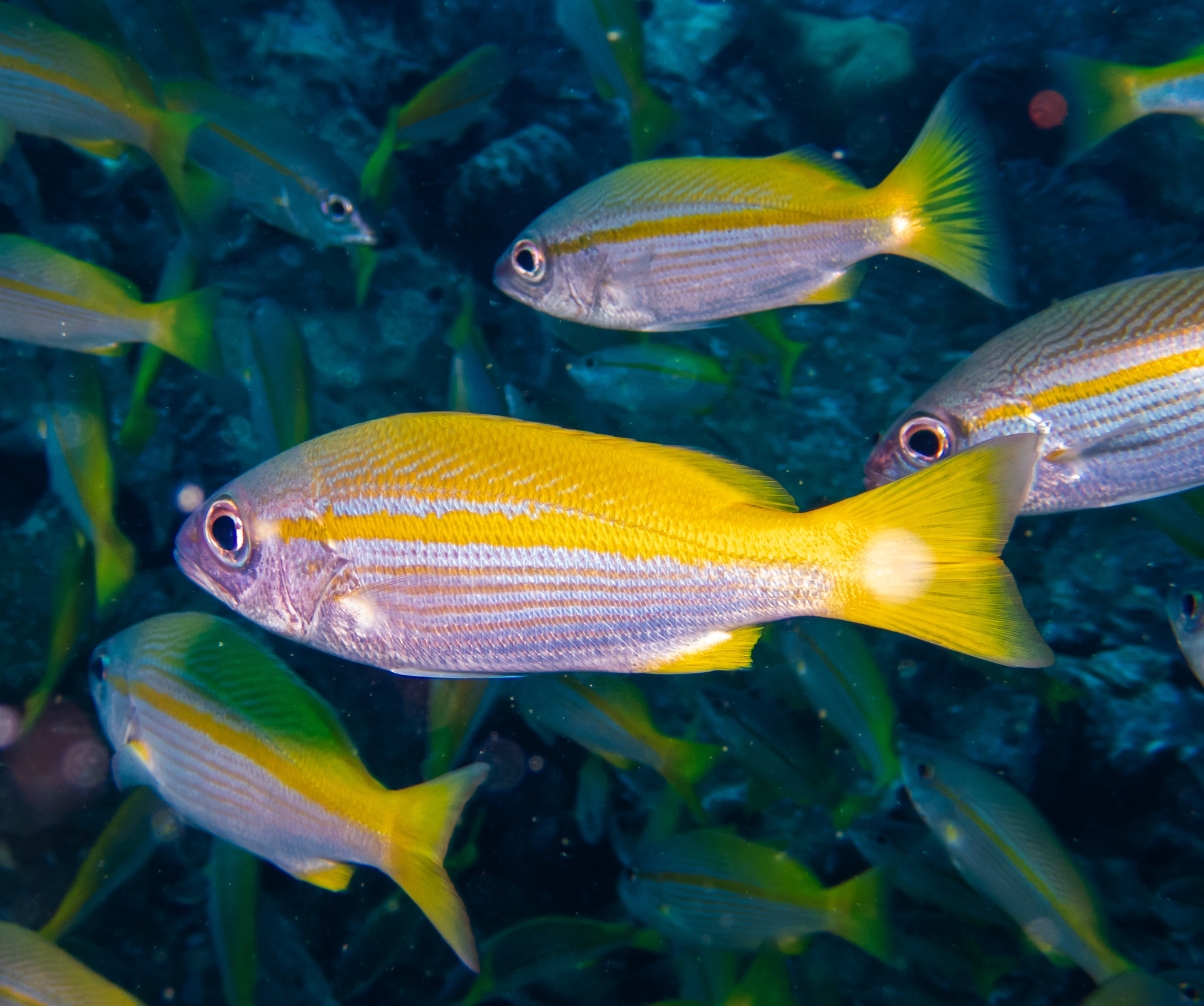
- Bigeye snapper (Lutjanus lutjanus)

Scientific classification
- Kingdom: Animalia
- Phylum: Chordata
- Class: Actinopterygii
- Division: Teleostei
- Order: Acanthuriformes
- Family: Lutjanidae; T. N. Gill, 1861

Subfamilies
- See text

= Lutjanidae =

Lutjanidae Temporal range: Early Eocene–present

Family of fishes

Lutjanidae, the snappers and fusiliers, are a family of percomorph fishes, mainly marine but with some members inhabiting estuaries and, in some cases, fresh water (e.g., Lutjanus goldiei). The family includes about 113 species. Most species are used for food and many are of high economic importance. Many species around the world are known in local languages as red snapper, including species from different genera (including Lutjanus and Pristipomoides)

Snappers inhabit tropical, subtropical, and warm-temperate regions of all oceans. Some snappers grow up to about 1 m (3.3 ft) in length, and one species, the cubera snapper, grows up to 1.52 m (5 ft 0 in) in length. Most are active carnivores, feeding on crustaceans or other fishes, though a few are plankton-feeders. They can be kept in aquaria, but commonly grow too fast to be popular aquarium fish. Most species live at depths reaching 100 m (330 ft) near coral reefs, but some species are found up to 500 m (1,600 ft) deep.

As with other fishes, some snapper species host parasites. A detailed study conducted in New Caledonia has shown that coral reef-associated snappers host about nine species of parasites per fish species.

== Systematics ==
The following classification is based on Eschmeyer's Catalog of Fishes:

- subfamily Apsilinae Johnson, 1980
  - genus Apsilus Valenciennes, 1830
  - genus Lipocheilus Anderson, Talwar & Johnson, 1977
  - genus Paracaesio Bleeker, 1875
  - genus Parapristipomoides Kami, 1963
- subfamily Etelinae Gill, 1893
  - genus Aphareus Cuvier, 1870
  - genus Aprion Valenciennes, 1830
  - genus Etelis Cuvier, 1828
  - genus Pristipomoides Bleeker, 2020
  - genus Randallichthys Anderson, Kami & Johnson, 1977
- subfamily Lutjaninae Gill, 1861
  - genus Caesio Lacépède, 1801
  - genus Dipterygonotus Bleeker, 1849
  - genus Gymnocaesio Bleeker, 1876
  - genus Hoplopagrus Gill, 1861
  - genus Lutjanus Bloch, 1790
  - genus Macolor Bleeker, 1860
  - genus Ocyurus Gill, 1862
  - genus Pinjalo Bleeker, 1873
  - genus Pterocaesio Bleeker, 1876
  - genus Rhomboplites Gill, 1862
- subfamily Paradicichthyinae Whitley, 1930
  - genus Symphorichthys Munro, 1967
  - genus Symphorus Günther, 1872

The following fossil genera are also known:

- genus †Goujetia Bannikov, 2006 (Early Eocene of Italy)
- genus †Hypsocephalus Swift & Ellwood, 1972 (Late Eocene of Florida, US)
- genus †Lessinia Bannikov & Sorbini, 2014 (Early Eocene of Italy)
- genus †Ottaviania Sorbini, 1983 (Early Eocene of Italy)
- genus †Veranichthys Bannikov, 2006 (Early Eocene of Italy)
- species †"Caesio" breviuscula Bannikov, 2000 (earliest Eocene of Turkmenistan)

The genus †Parapelates Bannikov, 2008 is likely also closely related to the snappers, though its taxonomic classification at the family level remains indeterminate. A well-preserved skeleton of a potential fossil lutjanid or cichlid is known from the Middle Eocene of Cuba, representing one of the earliest records of the group from the Caribbean.

The former family Caesionidae, the fusiliers, was previously treated as distinct due to their distinctive morphology. However, it is now known to be paraphyletic with respect to the Lutjanidae, and its genera are now classified within the Lutjaninae.

The following cladogram is based on the phylogenetic tree from a 2007 study using Bayesian Inference to analyze a combined dataset of 16S and cyt b:

- Nemipteridae
  - Nemipterus marginatus
  - Scolopsis ciliata
- - Sparidae
    - - Acanthopagrus berda
      - Sparidentex hasta
    - - Rhabdosargus thorpei
      - Sparodon durbanensis
  - - Haemulidae
      - - Diagramma labiosum
        - Plectorhinchus chrysotaenia
      - - Haemulon sciurus
        - Pomadasys maculatus
    - - Lethrinidae
        - Lethrinus ornatus
        - Lethrinus rubrioperculatus
      - Lutjanidae
        - - Etelinae
            - Aphareus furca
            - Aprion virescens
          - Paradicichthyinae
            - Symphorus nematophorus
            - Symphorichthys spilurus
        - ⊞Lutjaninae & Caesioninae (Paraphyletic)
          ⊟
          - Lutjaninae
            - - Lutjanus johnii
              - Lutjanus erythropterus
            - - Lutjanus adetii
              - Lutjanus sebae
          - - - Lutjaninae
                - Lutjanus bohar
                - Lutjanus gibbus
              - - Lutjaninae
                  Macolor niger
                - Caesioninae
                  - - Pterocaesio tile
                    - Caesio caerulaurea
                  - - Caesio cuning
                    - - Pterocaesio marri
                      - Pterocaesio pisang
            - Lutjaninae
              - - - Lutjanus decussatus
                  - Lutjanus vitta
                - - Lutjanus fulviflamma
                  - - Lutjanus monostigma
                    - - Lutjanus carponotatus
                      - Lutjanus russellii
              - - Lutjanus argentimaculatus
                - - - Lutjanus synagris
                    - - Rhomboplites aurorubens
                      - Lutjanus campechanus
                  - - Lutjanus stellatus
                    - - Lutjanus fulvus
                      - - Lutjanus kasmira
                        - Lutjanus quinquelineatus

== Gallery ==
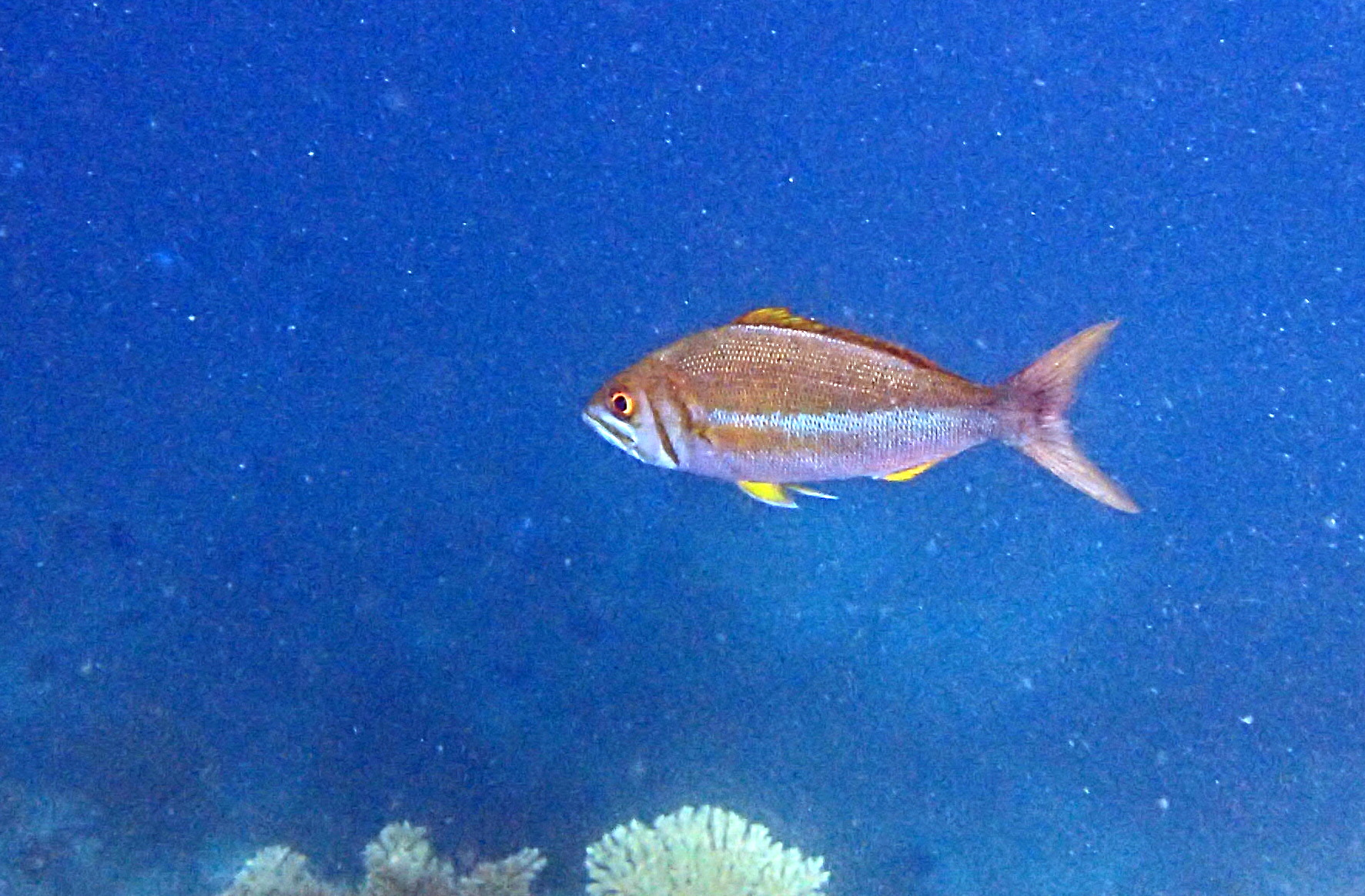
Aphareus furca

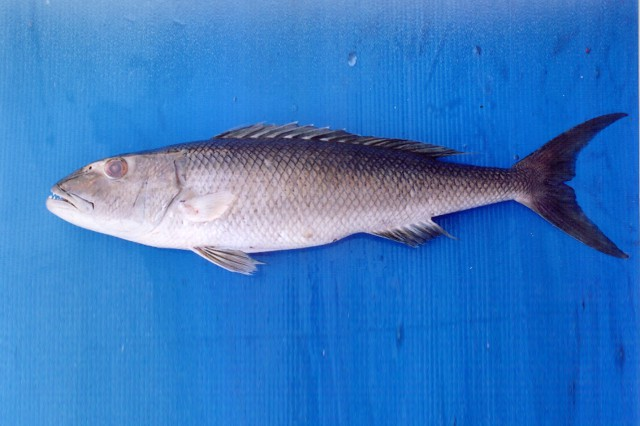
Aprion virescens

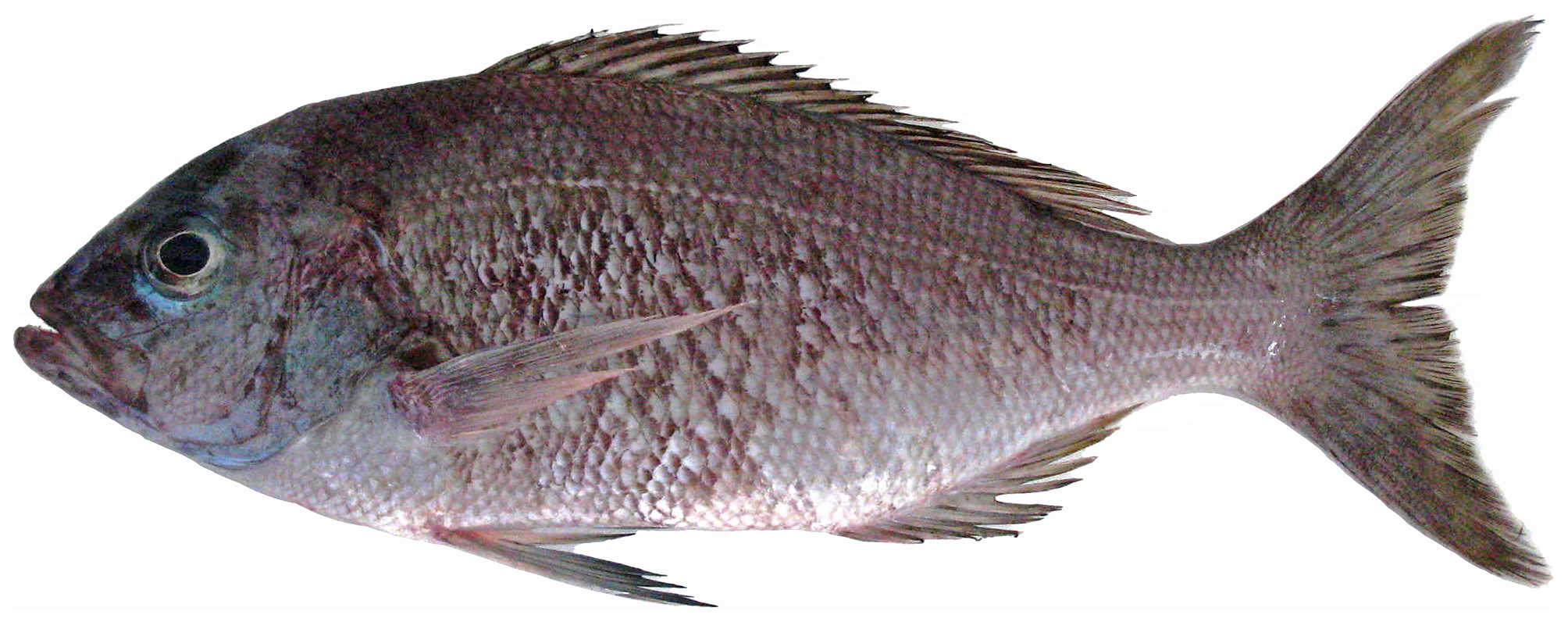
Apsilus dentatus

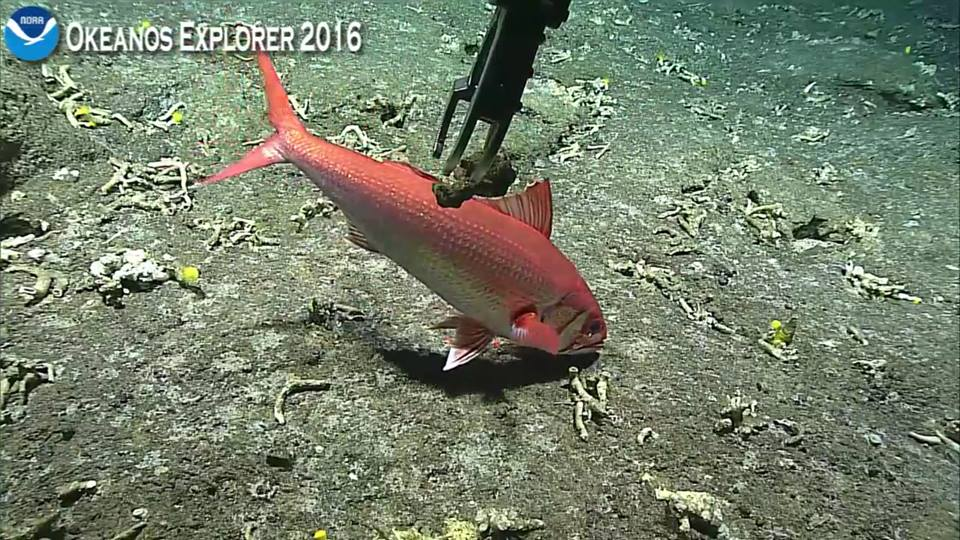
Etelis radiosus

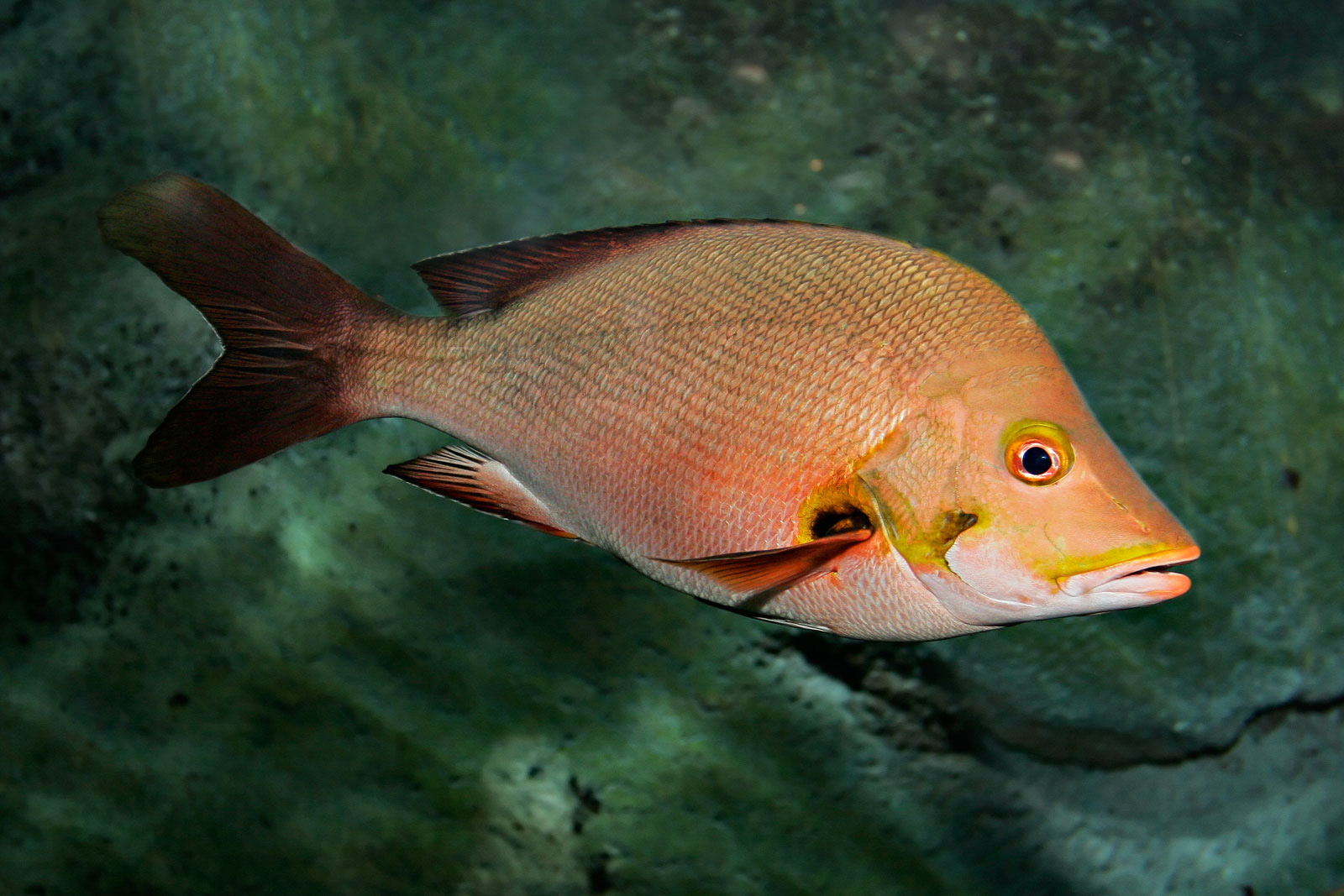
Lutjanus gibbus

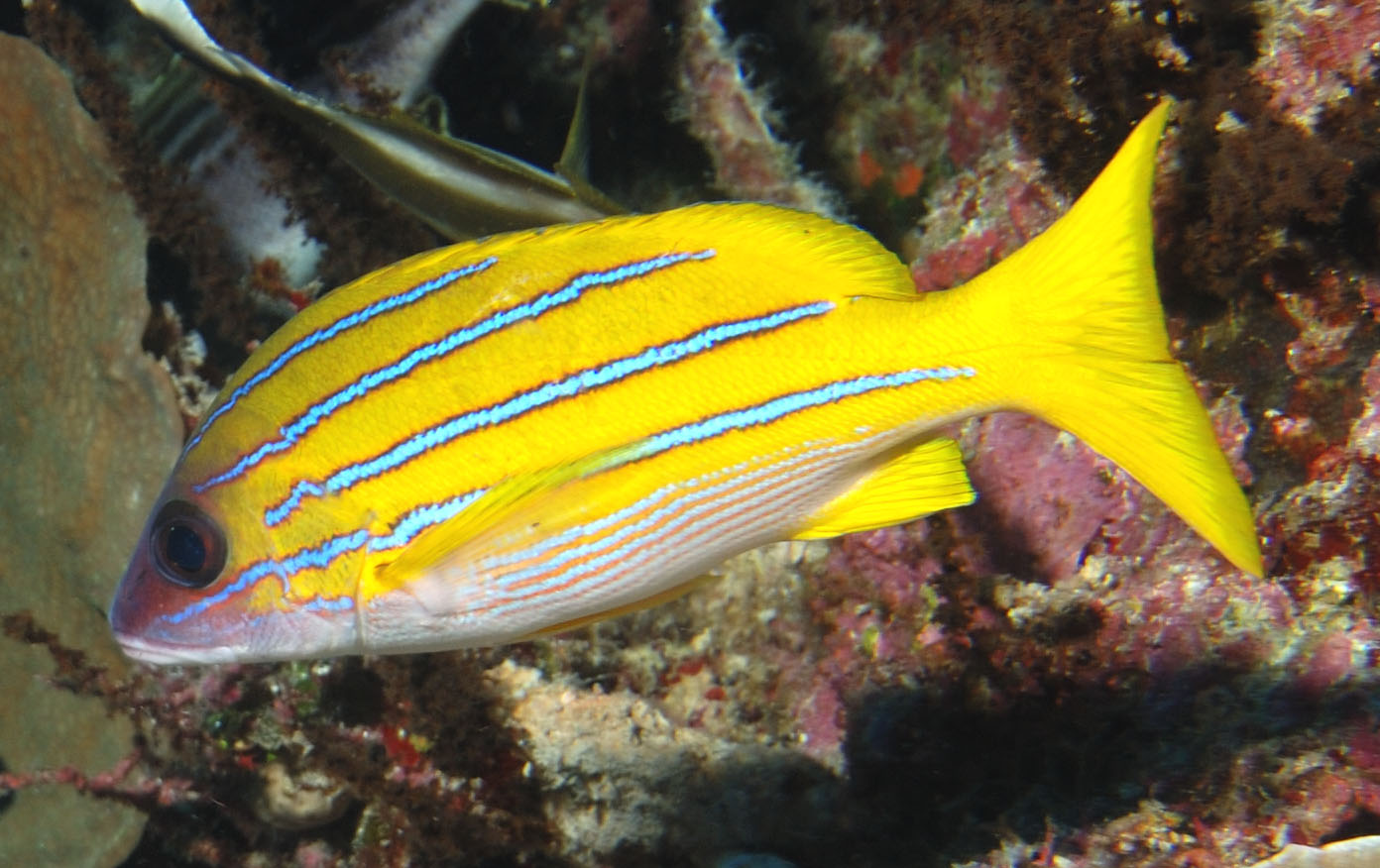
Lutjanus kasmira

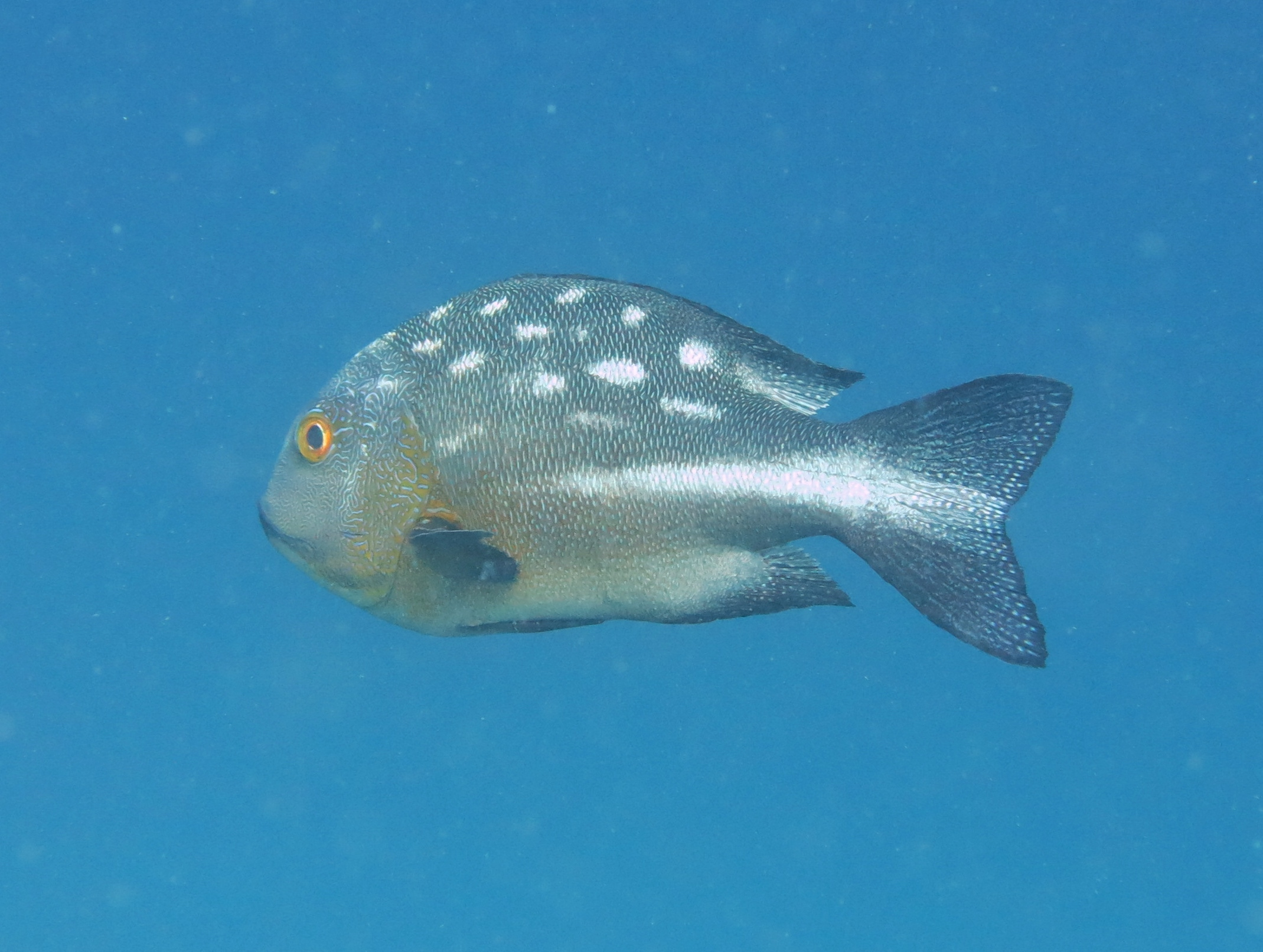
Macolor macularis

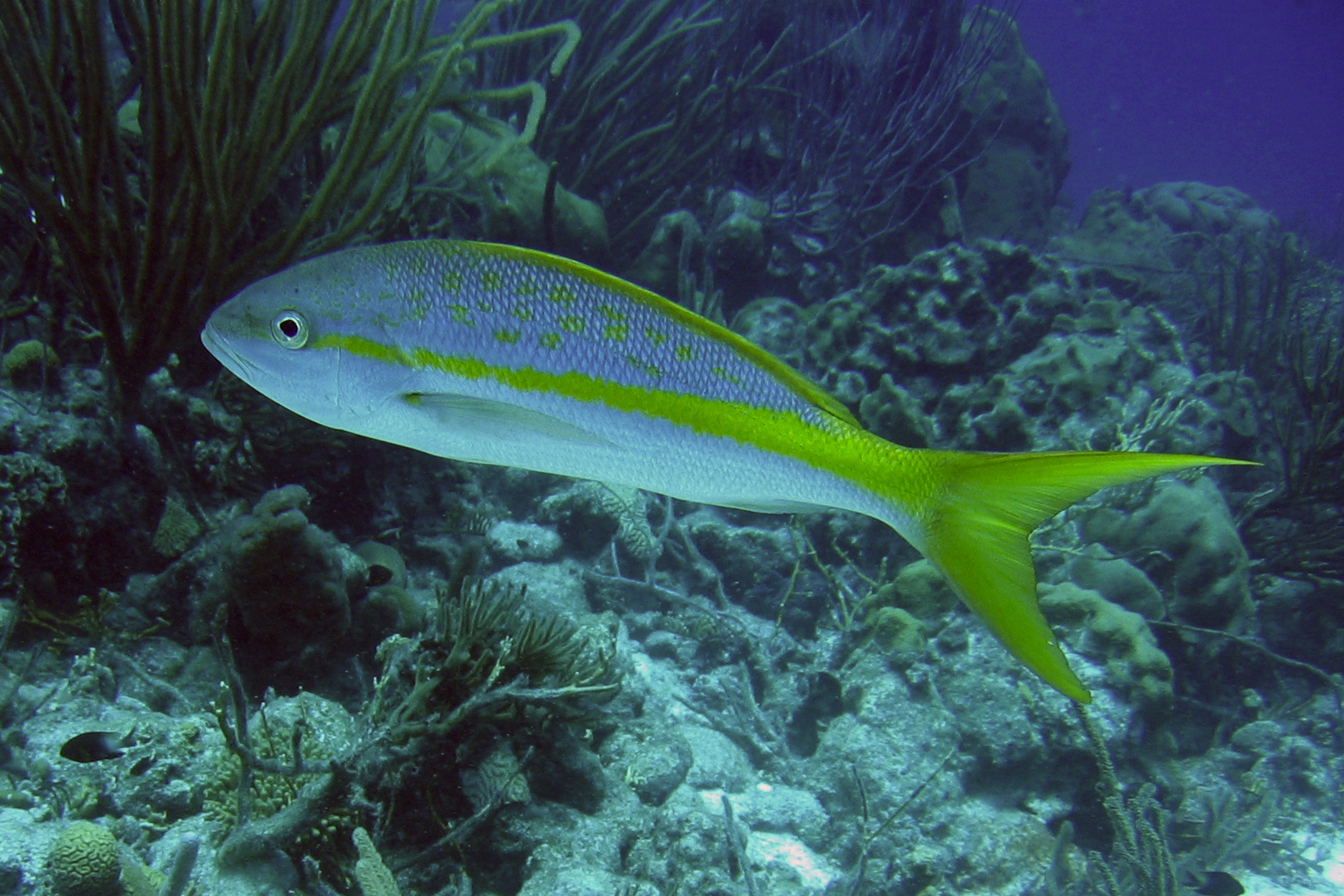
Ocyurus chrysurus

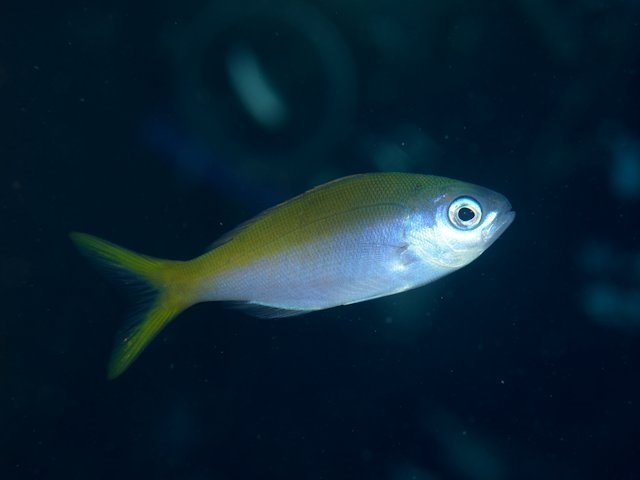
Paracaesio xanthura

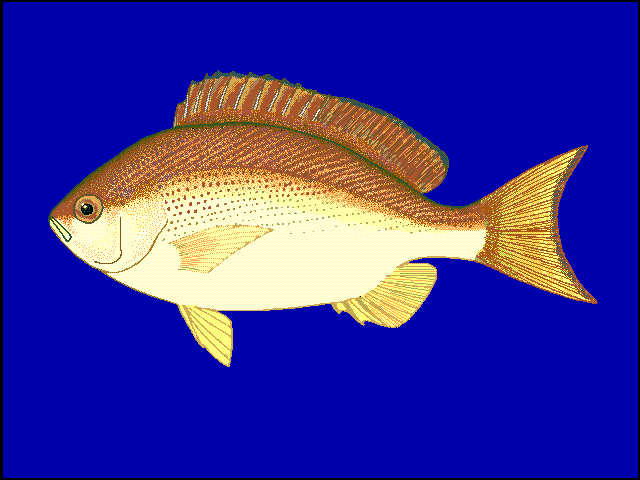
Pinjalo pinjalo

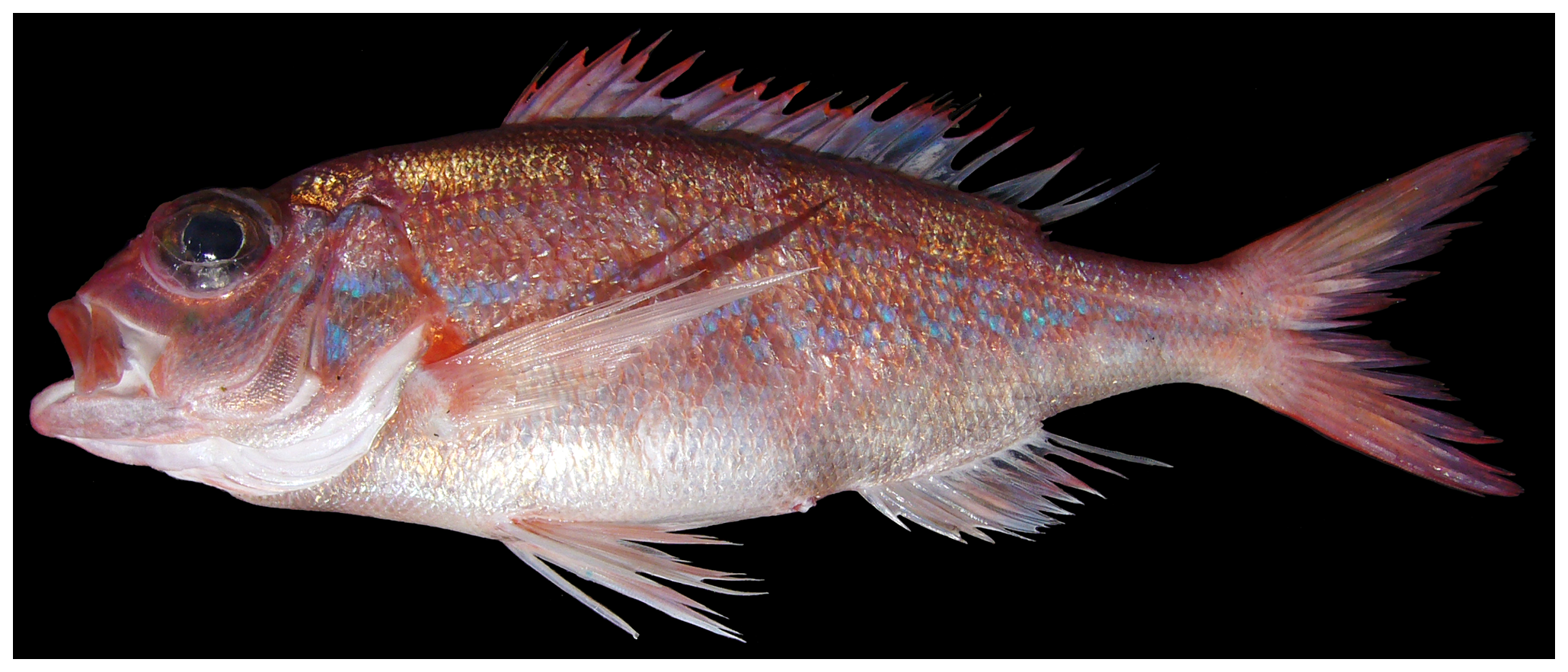
Pristipomoides aquilonaris

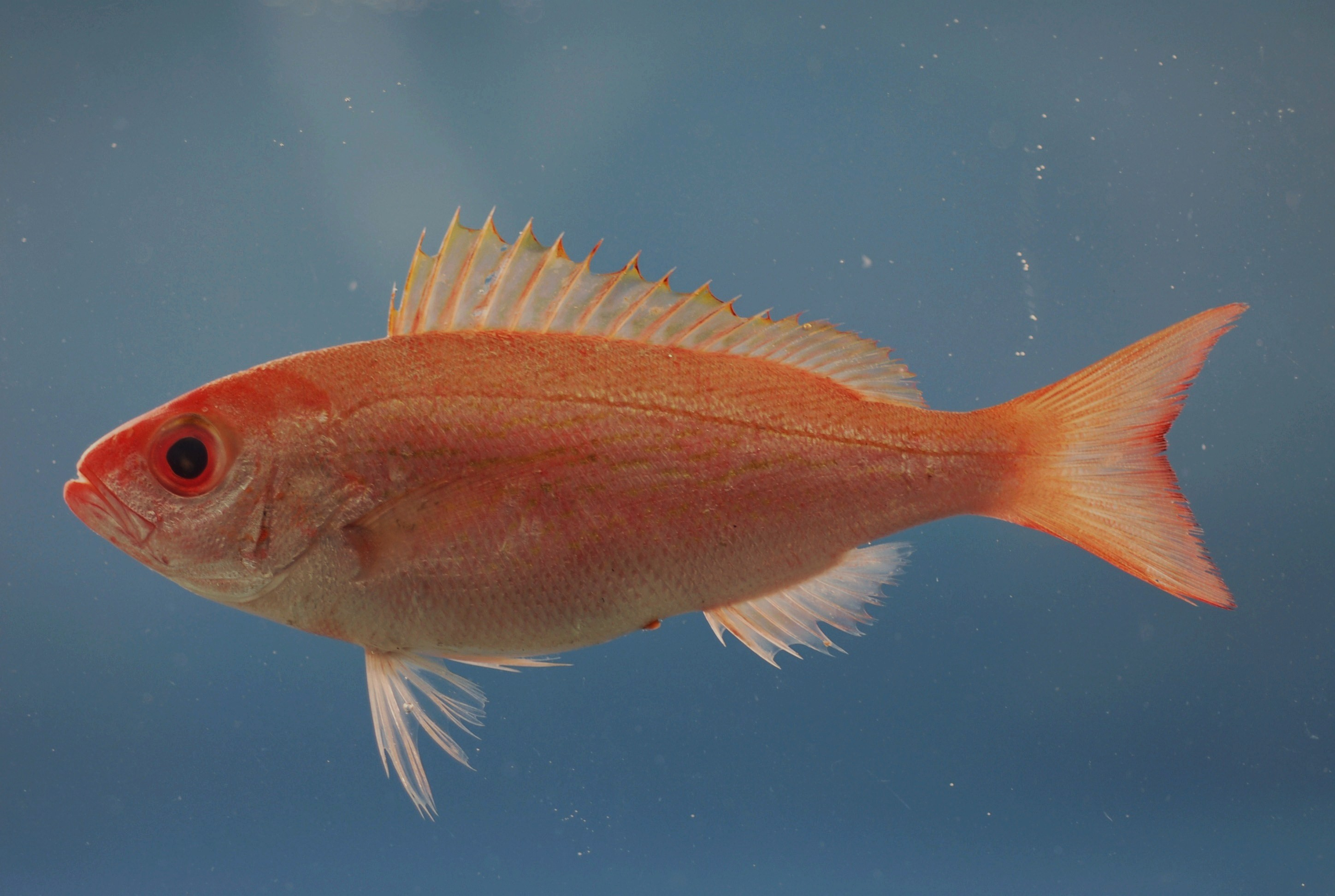
Rhomboplites aurorubens

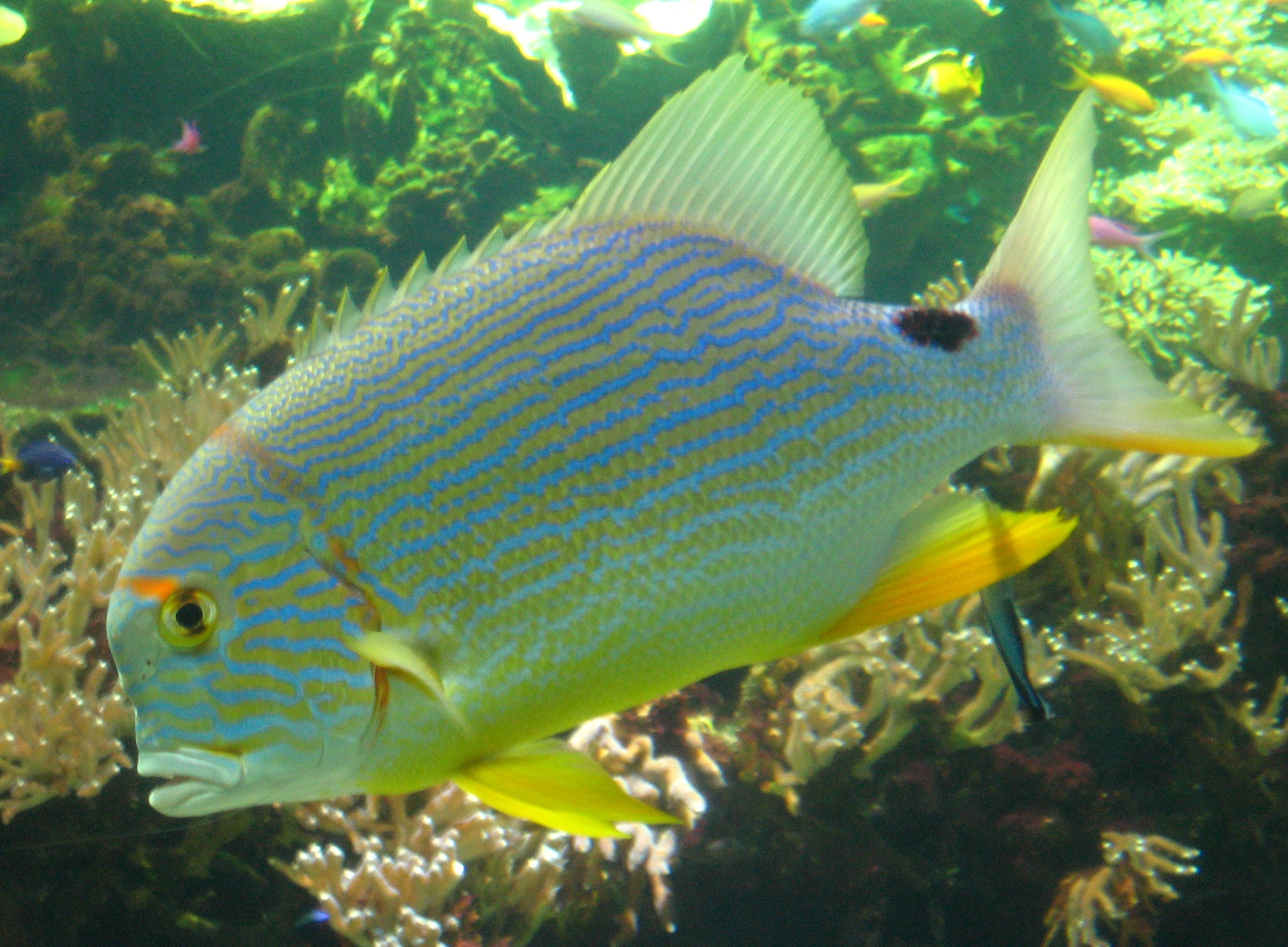
Symphorichthys spilurus
