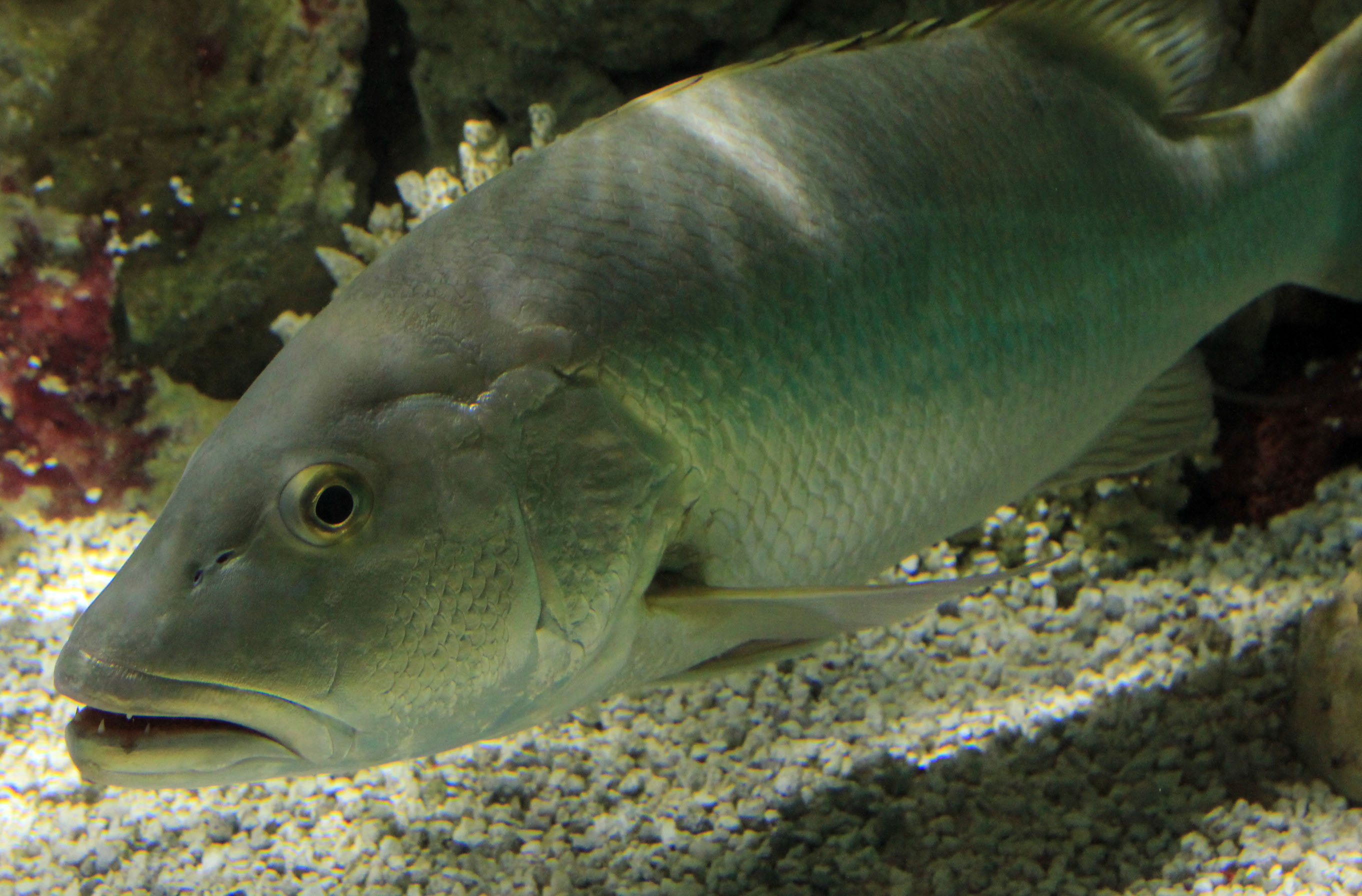

Conservation status
- Vulnerable (IUCN 3.1)

Scientific classification
- Kingdom: Animalia
- Phylum: Chordata
- Class: Actinopterygii
- Order: Acanthuriformes
- Family: Lutjanidae
- Genus: Lutjanus
- Species: L. cyanopterus

Binomial name
- Lutjanus cyanopterus (G. Cuvier, 1828)
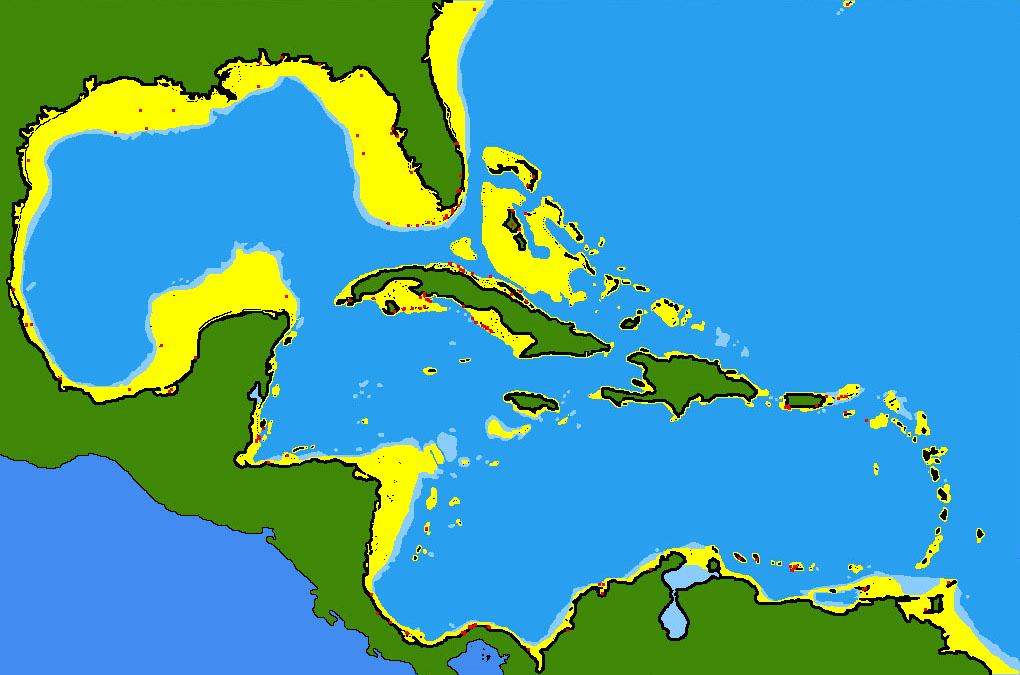

Synonyms
- Mesoprion cyanopterus G. Cuvier, 1828; Mesoprion pargus G. Cuvier, 1828; Lutjanus cubera Poey, 1871

= Cubera snapper =

Species of fish

The cubera snapper (Lutjanus cyanopterus), also known as the Cuban snapper, is a species of marine ray-finned fish, a snapper belonging to the family Lutjanidae. It is native to the western Atlantic Ocean. It is a commercially important species and is a sought-after game fish, though it has been reported to cause ciguatera poisoning.

== Taxonomy ==
The cubera snapper was first formally described as Mesoprion cyanopterus in 1828 by the French zoologist Georges Cuvier with the type locality given as Brazil. The specific name is a compound of cyano meaning "blue" and pterus which means "fin" as Cuvier described it as having bluish-black membranes on its median fins.

== Description ==
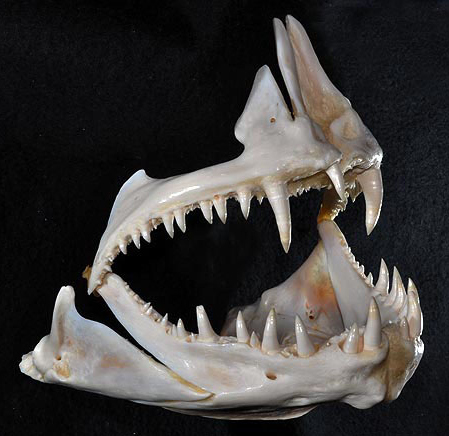
Jawbones of the cubera snapper

The cubera snapper has an oval-shaped, rather streamlined, elongate body, which is less deep than many other snapper species. It has a pair of front nostrils and a pair of rear nostrils that are simple holes in its snout. The mouth is relatively large with thick lips. The jaws are equipped with canine teeth, one enlarged pair being visible when the mouth is closed. The vomerine teeth are arranged in a crescent-shaped or triangular patch with no central posterior extension, with a tooth patch on each side of the roof of the mouth.

The preoperculum has a weakly developed knob and notch. This species has long pectoral fins, a continuous dorsal fin, and a truncated caudal fin. The dorsal fin contains 10 spines and 14 soft rays, while the anal fin has three spines and seven or eight soft rays, sometimes, a notch is seen behind the spiny part of the dorsal fin. The maximum total length recorded for this species is 160 cm (63 in), although a length of 90 cm (35 in) is more typical; the maximum published weight is 57 kg (126 lb). The overall colour of this species is grey to dark brown with pale to dark-grey flanks with some individuals showing a slight reddish hue on the body. The caudal fin is light grey, the pectoral fins may be translucent to pale grey, and a bluish hue is seen on the anal, pectoral, and pelvic fins. The juveniles show an indistinct barred pattern on their flanks.

== Distribution and habitat ==
The cubera snapper is found in the western Atlantic Ocean, from as far north as Nova Scotia to as far south as Santa Catarina in Brazil, and throughout the Caribbean Sea and the Gulf of Mexico and around Bermuda. It has been recorded from the Flores Islands in the Azores. It occurs at depths between 1 and 85 m (3 ft 3 in and 278 ft 10 in). The juveniles shelter within beds of sea grass in in-shore waters or in mangroves, and have been recorded entering fresh water. The adults move off-shore, where they inhabit rocky ledge and reef habitats.

== Biology ==
Cubera snapper adults are solitary fish that have a maximum longevity of 55 years.

=== Feeding ===
The cubera snapper is the largest species of snapper and is a predatory fish, its main prey being other fishes, with some crustaceans. The large canine teeth allow this species to feed on large crustaceans such as lobsters and crabs. They forage near the bottom or in the vicinity of hard structures. The whale shark (Rhincodon typus) feeds on the newly laid pelagic spawn of cubera snappers, while the larger fish are prey to moray eels, barracudas, groupers, other snappers, and large sharks.

=== Reproduction ===
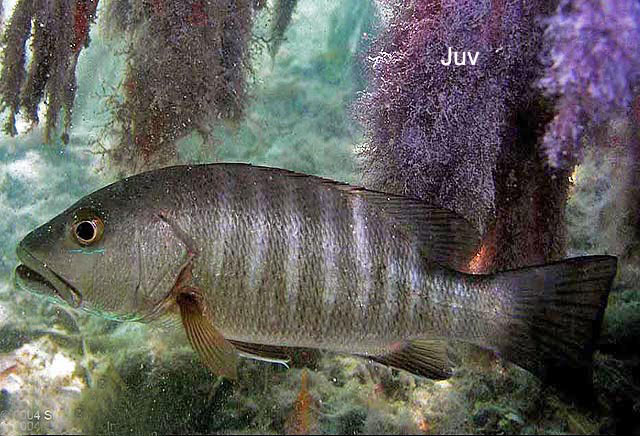
Juvenile

The cubera snapper spawns from May until August, when their gathering into large spawning aggregations is determined by the lunar cycles. They gather in large numbers, up to 10,000 fish over shallow spawning sites in off-shore waters at places such as outer reef slopes and sandy drop-offs. The eggs hatch within a day of fertilisation and the larvae are pelagic, drifting with the currents until they settle.

== Fisheries and conservation ==
The cubera snapper is considered to be a good-quality food fish, although larger fish in some areas are known to cause ciguatera poisoning in humans who consume their flesh. It is caught using hook-and-line with bottom longlines, gill nets, and bottom trawls, and occasionally by spearfishing. In areas where the larger fish are ciguatoxic, no fishery exists, as in Puerto Rico and the Lesser Antilles, or only smaller fish are consumed, as happens in the Florida Keys. In the United States, this species is subject to bag and size limits for both commercial and recreational fisheries. The predictable and accessible spawning aggregations of this species make it vulnerable to overfishing, and the catch decreased by over 60% off the Atlantic coast of the United States in the 20 years up to 2015; the numbers spawning off Cuba and Brazil had also decreased. In Brazil, some stocks have declined so much that they are commercially extinct. The IUCN predict further declines unless aggregations are protected, so listed the species as vulnerable.
