= Pinjalo =

Pinjalo may refer to:

- Pinjalo (genus), a genus of fishes in the family Lutjanidae
  - Pinjalo pinjalo, the fish species with the common name pinjalo
  - Pinjalo lewisi, the fish species with the common name slender or red pinjalo
