= Staveleya =

Scientific classification
- Kingdom: Animalia
- Phylum: Arthropoda
- Subphylum: Chelicerata
- Class: Arachnida
- Order: Araneae
- Infraorder: Araneomorphae
- Family: Linyphiidae
- Genus: Staveleya; Sherwood, 2021

Type species
- Cnephalocotes dahli (Menge, 1869)

Species
- 4, see text

Synonyms
- Hypsocephalus Millidge, 1978

Genus of spiders

Staveleya is a genus of European sheet weavers. Its current name is a replacement for Hypsocephalus, already a genus in the snapper family of fish. The type species was originally described under the name "Microneta pusilla", but the type species is designated one of the junior synonyms, "Cnephalocotes dahli" because it has a physical specimen. The genus is named in honour of Eliza Fanny Staveley, the first woman to publish research on arachnology in the United Kingdom.

== Species ==
As of December 2021 it contains four species:

- S. huberti (Millidge, 1975) – France (Corsica)
- S. nesiotes (Simon, 1915) – France (Corsica)
- S. paulae (Simon, 1918) – France, Switzerland, Italy
- S. pusilla (Menge, 1869) (type) – Central Europe and Italy to Greece and Ukraine

== See also ==
- Mecopisthes
- Cnephalocotes
- Microneta
