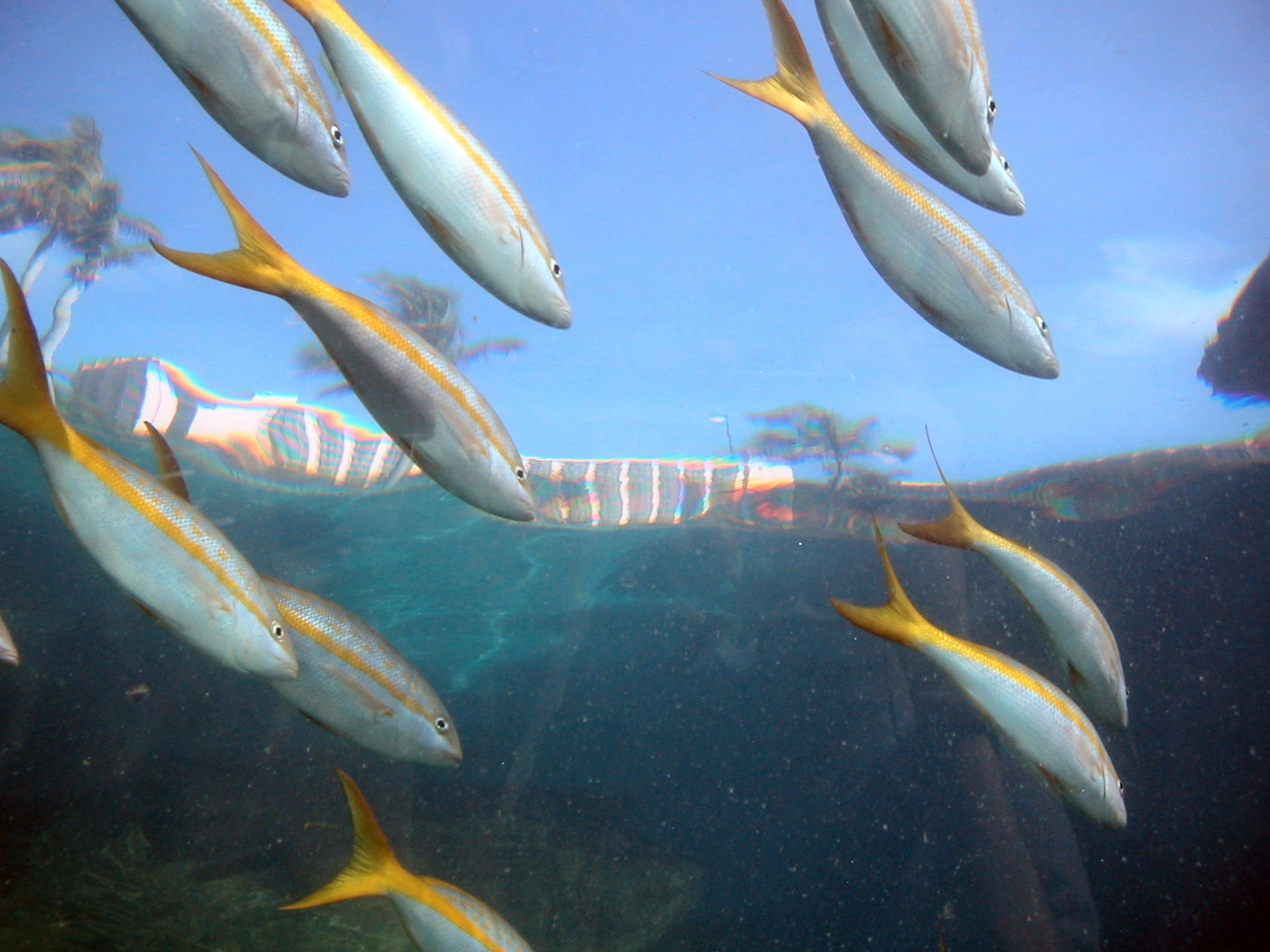

Conservation status
- Data Deficient (IUCN 3.1)

Scientific classification
- Kingdom: Animalia
- Phylum: Chordata
- Class: Actinopterygii
- Order: Acanthuriformes
- Family: Lutjanidae
- Subfamily: Lutjaninae
- Genus: Ocyurus; T. N. Gill, 1862
- Species: O. chrysurus

Binomial name
- Ocyurus chrysurus (Bloch, 1791)

Synonyms
- Sparus chrysurus Bloch, 1791; Lutjanus chrysurus (Bloch, 1791); Mesoprion chrysurus (Bloch, 1791); Anthias rabirrubia Bloch & J. G. Schneider, 1801; Sparus semiluna Lacépède, 1802; Mesoprion aurovittatus Agassiz, 1831; Ocyurus aurovittatus (Agassiz, 1831); Ocyurus rijgersmaei Cope, 1871

= Yellowtail snapper =

Species of fish

The yellowtail snapper (Ocyurus chrysurus) is an abundant species of snapper native to the western Atlantic Ocean including the Gulf of Mexico and the Caribbean Sea. Although they have been found as far north as Massachusetts, their normal range is along Florida south to the West Indies and Brazil. This species is mostly found around coral reefs, but may be found in other habitats. They occur at depths of from near the surface to 180 meters (590 ft), though mostly between 10 and 70 m (33 and 230 ft). This species can reach a length of 86.3 cm (34.0 in), though most do not exceed 40 cm (16 in). The greatest weight recorded for this species is 4.98 kg (11.0 lb). Yellowtail snapper is a commercially important species and has been farmed. It is sought as a game fish by recreational anglers and is a popular species for display in public aquaria. This species is the only known member of its genus.

In certain reefs, most notably in the Florida Keys, this beautifully colored fish is commonly spotted among divers and snorkelers.

== Taxonomy and naming ==
The yellowtail snapper was first formally described in 1791 as Sparus chrysurus by the German physician and naturalist Marcus Elieser Bloch with the type locality given as "Brazilian seas".

It is the sole member of the monotypic genus Ocyurus, the name of which is derived from the Greek words okys, meaning "swift", as in the bird, and oura, meaning "tail", a reference to the tail being forked like that of a swift. Chrysurus is derived from the Greek word chryso, meaning "golden".

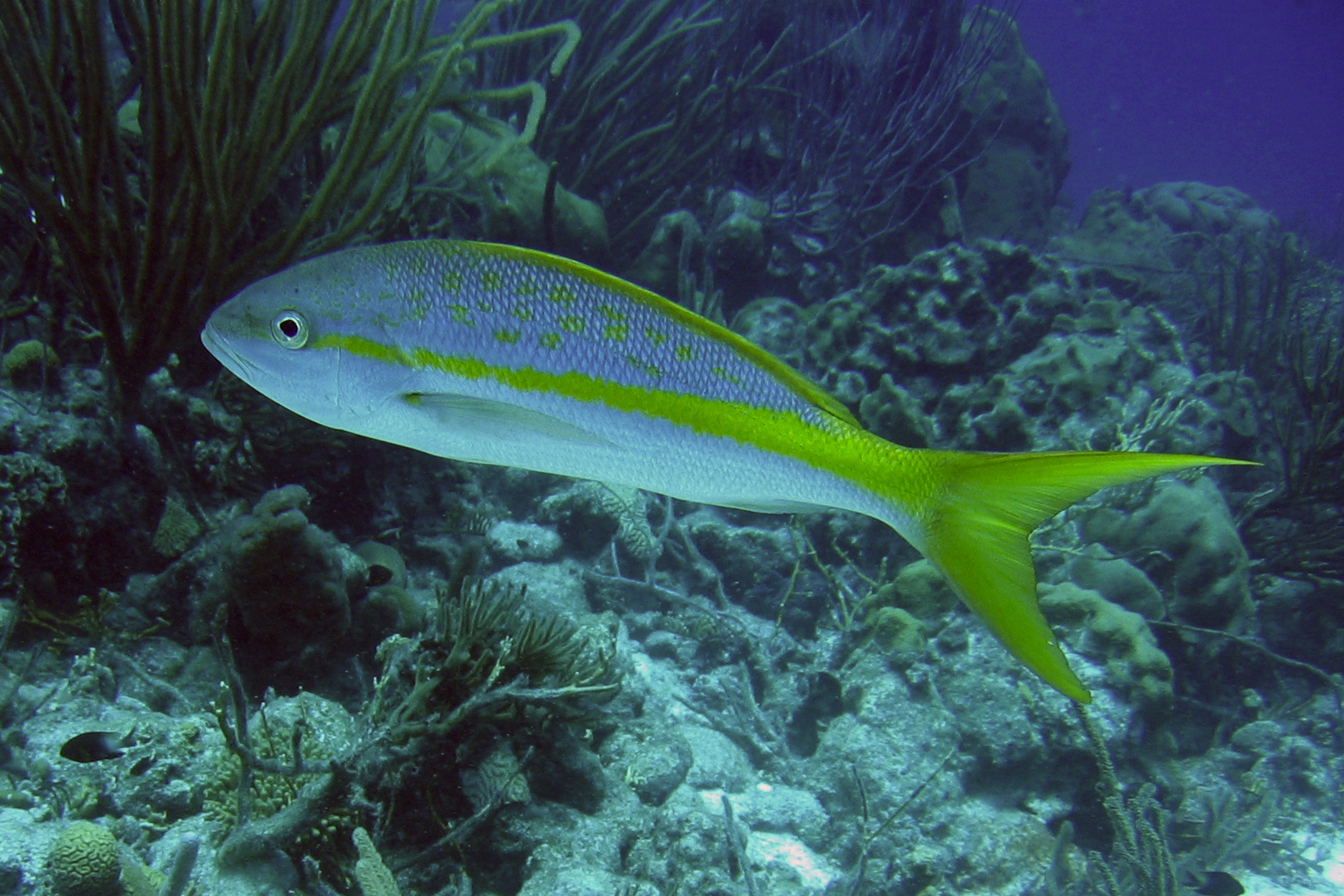
Underwater photo of a yellowtail snapper (Ocyurus chrysurus)

A taxonomic study of snappers within the subfamily Lutjaninae in the tropical western Atlantic Ocean indicated that the at monotypic genera Ocyurus and Rhomboplites sit within the genus Lutjanus. Lutjanus ambiguus is considered by some authorities to most likely to be a hybrid between L. synagris and O. chrysurus, supporting the close relation between the two genera.

== Description ==
Yellowtail snapper have a distinct yellow lateral band beginning at the snout that gets wider towards the forked tail, which is completely yellow. The rest of the fish is an olive to bluish black color with yellow spots above the lateral band. The dorsal fin is yellow while the anal and pelvic fins are whitish.

The species has one dorsal fin and one anal fin, which are partially supported by bony spines. The dorsal fin consists of ten spines and between twelve and fourteen soft rays, while the anal fin has three spines and eight or nine soft rays. Scales are found on the bases of the soft portions of the dorsal and anal fins. The pectoral fin is long, and its tip reaches the level of the vent.

In contrast to other snapper species, the head and mouth of Ocyurus chrysurus are small and the species does not have a dark lateral spot below its dorsal fin. Like other snappers, canine teeth are present in the upper jaw of O. chrysurus. Most teeth in the upper and lower jaws are villiform, however. A distinctive characteristic is the presence of teeth on the ectopterygoid bones.

== Ecology ==
Yellowtail snapper are native to the Western Atlantic Ocean. Though their range extends as far north as Massachusetts and as far south as southeastern Brazil, the species is most common in the Bahamas, off the coast of south Florida and throughout the Caribbean.

Natural predators of adult yellowtail snapper include large fishes such as barracuda, mackerel, grouper, sharks, and even other snapper species. Yellowtails feed on shrimp, crabs, worms, and smaller fish. They spawn in groups off the edges of reefs from spring to fall, but heavily in midsummer.

== Fishing ==
Yellowtail snapper are typically caught in 30–120 ft of water on and around reefs and other structures. The most common method of catching them is with hook and line, and the use of frozen chum, typically leftover ground fish parts, to attract the fish. The chum is placed into a mesh bag or metal basket in the water, and as the chum slowly melts, small pieces of fish drift out and down towards the bottom, where the yellowtails typically feed. The chum keeps them near the boat for extended periods of time, as well.

Light tackle is the generally accepted means of catching yellowtail snapper. Typically, the fish are relatively wary of higher-test or thicker line, and larger hooks. Most fish caught by anglers range from eight to 14 in, although catches to 16 in are not uncommon. Larger fish are often called "flags" in the United States, as their tails resemble flags fluttering in the wind. Yellowtail snapper can be caught on a variety of baits, including both live and frozen shrimp, squid, and a variety of live and frozen minnows or smaller baitfish. Yellowtail tend to be wary fish, and the appearance of larger predators, such as dolphins or sharks, can scare off schools until the predator leaves the area.

Most anglers pursue yellowtail snapper during the warmer months, but they can be caught throughout the year. Yellowtail snapper is highly prized for its light, flaky meat and is considered by some to be one of the best of the snapper family.

Normally, yellowtail are caught and sold to eat, especially in American cuisine.

== Conservation and management ==
Yellowtail snapper is not overfished and the stock is not currently experiencing overfishing in the United States. However, yellowtail stocks in Cuba and Brazil are overfished and the species is listed as highly vulnerable to overfishing in Mexico. Management of the stock is extremely limited in this region.
