= Nunuk =

Nunuk can refer to:

== Places ==
=== Settlements ===
- Nunuk, West Java, a village in Indramayu Regency, West Java, Indonesia
- Nunuk, North Sulawesi , a village in South Bolaang Mongondow Regency, North Sulawesi, Indonesia
- Nunuk Baru, a village in Majalengka Regency, West Java, Indonesia
- Nunuk Ragang the location of the original home of the ancestors of the Kadazan-Dusun
- Nunuk Tanah Kibang, a village in Malinau Regency, North Kalimantan, Indonesia
- Kampung Lok Nunuk, a village in Kota Belud, Sabah

=== Rivers ===
- Tapa Nunuk, a river in Indonesia
- Kuala Nunuk, a river in Indonesia

== People ==
- Nunuk Niraini (1961–2021), also known as Bu Nunuk, food scientist who invented Indomie brand mi goreng flavor instant noodles
- Nunuk Nuswardani, an employee at the Ministry of Research, Technology, and Higher Education
- Anik Nunuk Wulyani, associate Professor at State University of Malang
- Hesti Nunuk Andriyan (b. 1963, Lumajang), an Indonesian politician
- Agustina Nunuk Prasetyo Murniati, a catholic theologian

== Other uses ==
- Nunuk, the Indonesian language word for the fish Pinjalo lewisi
- Nunuk, the Kadazan Dusun-language word for banyan
