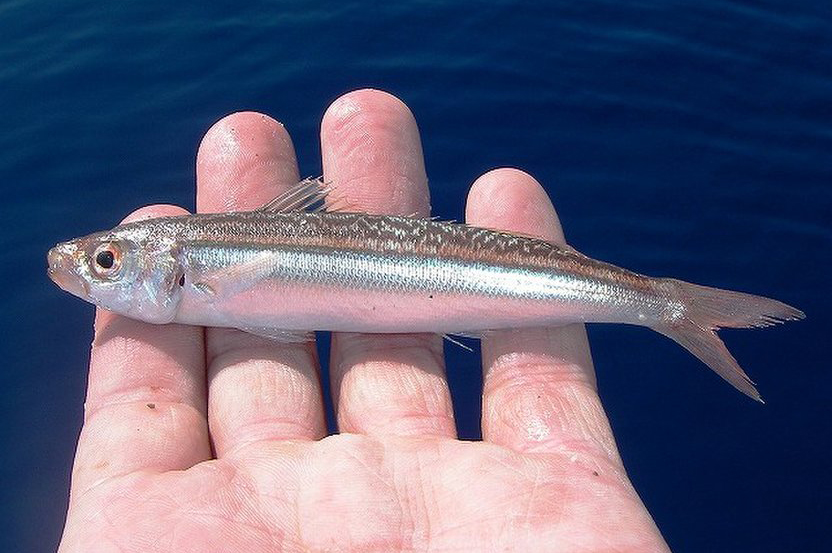

Conservation status
- Least Concern (IUCN 3.1)

Scientific classification
- Kingdom: Animalia
- Phylum: Chordata
- Class: Actinopterygii
- Order: Acanthuriformes
- Family: Lutjanidae
- Genus: Dipterygonotus; Bleeker, 1849
- Species: D. balteatus

Binomial name
- Dipterygonotus balteatus (Valenciennes, 1830)

Synonyms
- Smaris balteatus Valenciennes, 1830; Dipterygonotus leucogrammicus Bleeker, 1849; Dipterygonotus gruveli Chabanaud, 1924

= Mottled fusilier =

Species of ray-finned fish

The mottled fusilier (Dipterygonotus balteatus) is a species of marine ray-finned fish, a fusilier belonging to the family Lutjanidae. It has a broad Indo-Pacific distribution. Once thought to be a monotypic genus, until a second species Dipterygonotus marisrubri was transferred in 2024.

== Taxonomy ==
The mottled fusilier was first formally described in 1830 as Smaris balteatus by the French zoologist Achille Valenciennes with the type locality being given as Sri Lanka. In 1849, the Dutch ichthyologist Pieter Bleeker described a new species, Dipterygonotus leucogrammicus. placing it in a new monotypic genus. Bleeker's species was later shown to be a synonym of Smaris balteatus but the genus is considered to be valid. The genus name is a compound of di meaning "two" and pterygion which means fin and notus meaning "back", at the time Valenciennes thought that this species was porgy belonging to the family Sparidae but one which had the spiny dorsal fin obviously different, and occasionally apart, from the soft rayed part. The specific name balteatus means "belted" or "banded", a reference to the stripe on the upper flanks.

== Description ==
The mottled fusilier has a slender, fusiform body which is elongate and shows moderate lateral compression. There are small conical teeth on maxillae and the vomer but there are none on the premaxilla and palatines. The dorsal fin has 14 spines and 8 to 11 soft rays while the anal fin contains 3 spines and normally 9 or 10 soft rays. There are 16–19 pectoral fin rays. This species grows to a maximum total length of 14 cm (5.5 in). The overall colour is silvery darkening to brownish or bronze on the back. There is a silvery stripe along the flank from the upper operculum to the caudal peduncle, and there are 3–4 light sinuous thin stripes on the back.

== Distribution and habitat ==
The mottled fusilier has a wide Indo-Pacific range. It occurs along the eastern coast of Africa from the Gulf of Aden to South Africa, east across the Indian Ocean to the Solomon Islands, south as far as Australia and northwards to southern Japan. In addition, the mottled fusilier has also been recorded from New Caledonia. In Australian waters it is distributed from north of Port Hedland in Western Australia extending north around the tropical coast to the east coast where it reaches as far south as Hat Head in New South Wales and off the reefs of the Coral Sea. Several individuals were reported in 2017 in the eastern Mediterranean Sea off Lebanon, likely introduced via the Suez Canal.

It is found at depths between 37 and 91 m (120 and 300 ft). The adults are mainly pelagic over the continental shelf comparatively distant from reefs. They may form mixed species schools with other inshore small pelagic species. The juveniles are frequently found around reefs.

== Biology ==
The mottled fusilier forms mixed species schools with other pelagic fish such as sardines and anchovies. It feeds on zooplankton. It is an oviparous species which lays large numbers of small, pelagic eggs.

== Fisheries ==
The mottled fusilier is subject to heavy fishing pressure in southeast Asia and may make up a significant proportion of landings of small pelagic fishes. It is sometimes caught to be used as bait in fisheries for larger species such as tuna. They are taken at night, lights being used to attract them and dip nets the used to capture the fish. It can be sold fresh alongside sardines and anchovies in the Philippines.
