= Starfish Island =

Island in Puerto Princesa, Philippines

Coordinates: 9°54′06″N 118°47′49″E

Starfish Island is a snorkeling location near Puerto Princesa, Philippines. The island has a small number of stilt huts as accommodation. The rocks NE of Starfish Island Depth have schools of snappers, fusiliers and some puffers.
