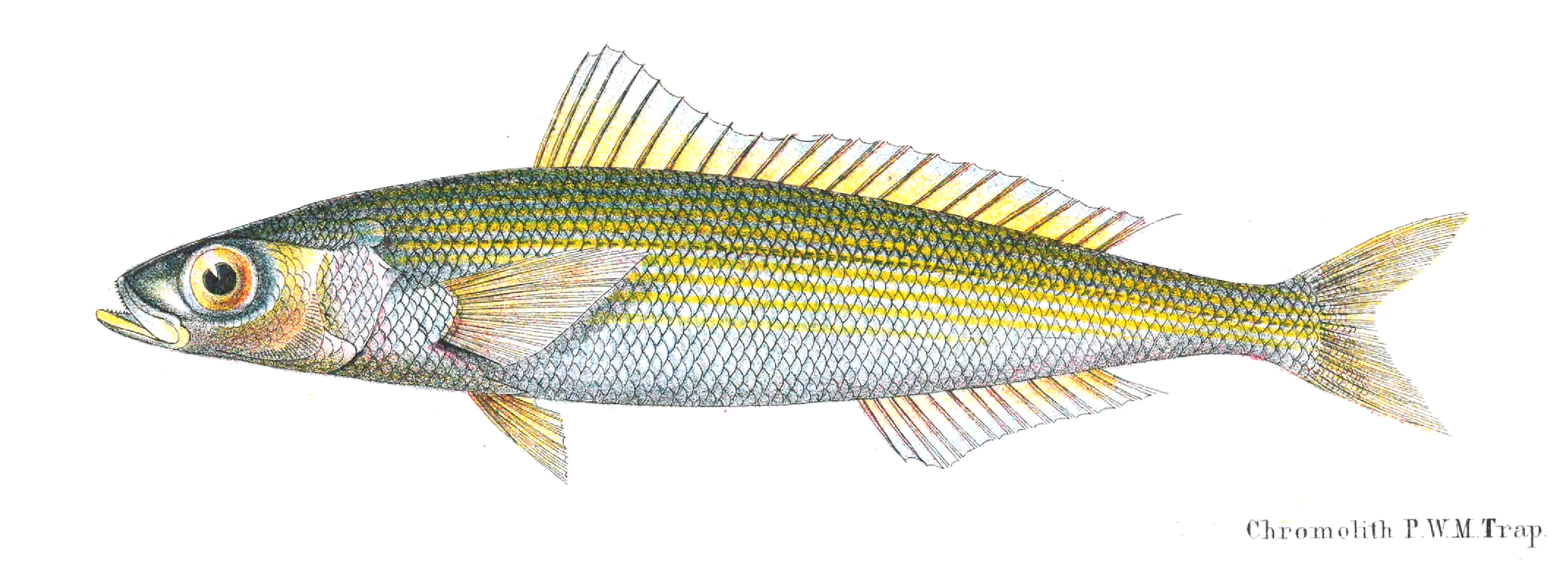

Conservation status
- Least Concern (IUCN 3.1)

Scientific classification
- Kingdom: Animalia
- Phylum: Chordata
- Class: Actinopterygii
- Order: Acanthuriformes
- Family: Lutjanidae
- Subfamily: Lutjaninae
- Genus: Gymnocaesio; Bleeker, 1876
- Species: G. gymnoptera

Binomial name
- Gymnocaesio gymnoptera (Bleeker, 1856)

Synonyms
- Caesio gymnopterus Bleeker, 1856

= Slender fusilier =

Species of ray-finned fish

The slender fusilier (Gymnocaesio gymnoptera) is a species of marine ray-finned fish, a fusilier belonging to the family Lutjanidae. It is native to tropical reefs in the Indian Ocean and the western Pacific Ocean, it is of minor importance to local commercial fisheries. This species is the only known member of its genus.

== Taxonomy ==
The slender fusilier was first formally described in 1856 as Caesio gymnopterus by the Dutch ichthyologist Pieter Bleeker with the type locality being given as Ternate. In 1876, Bleeker described a new genus, Gymnocaesio with C. gymnopterus as its type species by montypy, it is still the only species in that genus. The genus name is a compound of gymno meaning "naked" and caesio as in the related genus Caesio in which this species was originally placed. The specific name also uses gymno as a prefix for pterus which means fin, a reference to the lack of scales on the dorsal and anal fins, these are scaled in Caesio.

== Description ==
The slender fusilier has a slender, fusiform, elongated and moderately laterally compressed body. There are small conical teeth on the maxillae and the vomer while the premaxilla and palatines lack any teeth. The dorsal fin has 10–11 spines and 14–16 soft rays while the anal fin has 3 spines and 11–13 soft rays. There are 20–22 pectoral fin rays. The back and upper flanks are bluish green in colour, with centres of scales paler, creating a striped appearance. There is a yellow or brown stripe its widtrgh being roughly equal to a single scale over the lateral line, running for much of the later line's length but running above the lateral line on the caudal peduncle. There is frequently a vivid blue horizontal band directly underneath the lateral line stripe taking up as much as one third of the flanks. The rest of the body is silvery white. The axil of pectoral fin is black and there are black tips to the lobes of the otherwise dusky caudal fin, the rest of the fins are white. This species attains a maximum total length of 18 cm (7.1 in).

== Distribution and habitat ==
The slender fusilier is found in the Indian Ocean from the southern Red Sea to South Africa, eastwards through the Seychelles and Mascarenes to the Maldives and Laccadives, Sri Lanka and southern India eastwards as far as Fiji in the Pacific Ocean. It extends as far north as Japan and as far south as Papua New Guinea and New Caledonia. It occurs in coastal waters in the vicinity of coral reefs at depths down to 500 m (1,600 ft).

== Biology ==
The slender fusilier has a diet of zooplankton which it forages for in large midwater aggregations. It frequently joins in mixed species schools with members of the genus Pterocaesio. It is an oviparous species which lays large numbers of small, pelagic eggs.

== Fisheries ==
The slender fusilier has minor importance as a target species for fisheries. It is sometimes caught using fish traps and drive-in nets. In the Philippines the fish landed are sold as fresh fish while in the Maldives, Laccadives and the Western Pacific it is caught to be used as bait for tuna fishing. In some parts of its range it is overfished.
