= Hypsocephalus =

Hypsocephalus Temporal range: Late Eocene, 37–33.9 Ma

Scientific classification
- Kingdom: Animalia
- Phylum: Chordata
- Class: Actinopterygii
- Order: Acanthuriformes
- Family: Lutjanidae
- Subfamily: Lutjaninae
- Genus: †Hypsocephalus; Swift & Ellwood, 1972
- Species: †H. atlanticus

Binomial name
- †Hypsocephalus atlanticus Swift & Ellwood, 1972

Extinct genus of fishes

Hypsocephalus (Greek for "elevated head") is an extinct genus of prehistoric marine ray-finned fish, a snapper belonging to the family Lutjanidae. It contains a single species, H. atlanticus, from the latest Eocene-aged Crystal River Formation of northern Florida, US. It is the earliest known crown-group snapper, as it is thought to be closely related to the modern Mexican barred snapper (Hoplopagrus guentheri) from the eastern Pacific Ocean.

It is known from a single well-preserved neurocranium, jawbone, and some other associated skull bones. The highly elevated neurocranium closely resembles that of the extant Hoplopagrus, and the two are thus assumed to be sister genera. It is assumed that relatives of Hoplopagrus were widespread throughout tropical American waters until dramatic cooling and sea level falls occurred during the Oligocene and Neogene, restricting it to just the Pacific coast.

The genus name Hypsocephalus was also used for a genus of modern sheetweaver spider a few years after the description of H. atlanticus. Due to the genus name already being preoccupied by H. atlanticus, the genus name of the spiders was changed to Staveleya in 2021.
