= Dipterygonotus =

Scientific classification
- Kingdom: Animalia
- Phylum: Chordata
- Class: Actinopterygii
- Order: Acanthuriformes
- Family: Lutjanidae
- Subfamily: Lutjaninae
- Genus: Dipterygonotus; Bleeker, 1849

Genus of fishes

Dipterygonotus is a genus of fusiliers. It contains the following species:

- Dipterygonotus balteatus (Valenciennes, 1830)
- Dipterygonotus marisrubri (Fricke, Golani & Appelbaum-Golani, 2014)
