= Dipterygonotus marisrubri =

Conservation status
- Data Deficient (IUCN 3.1)

Scientific classification
- Kingdom: Animalia
- Phylum: Chordata
- Class: Actinopterygii
- Order: Acanthuriformes
- Family: Lutjanidae
- Genus: Dipterygonotus
- Species: D. marisrubri

Binomial name
- Dipterygonotus marisrubri (R. Fricke, Golani & Appelbaum-Golani, 2014)

Synonyms
- Emmelichthys marisrubri

Species of ray-finned fish

Dipterygonotus marisrubri is a species of marine ray-finned fish, first described in 2014. It is endemic to the waters of the Red Sea. This species can reach a standard length of 7.4 cm (2.9 in). Until 2024, it was classified as Emmelichthys marisrubri until a phylogenetic analysis suggested a transfer.

== Etymology ==
The specific name marisrubri refers to the Latin maris, sea; and rubrus, red, alluding to its type locality of the Red Sea.
