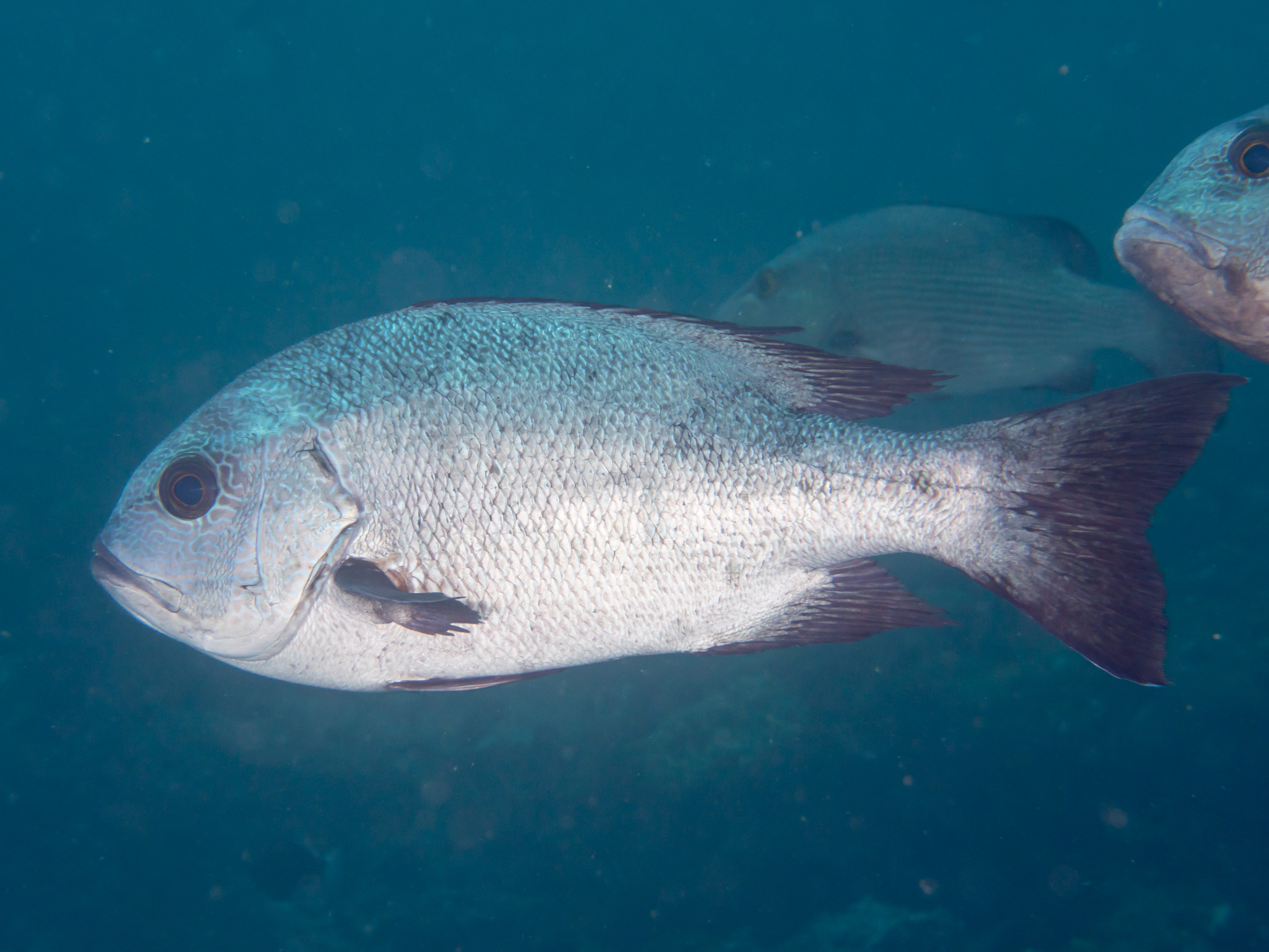
- Black and white snapper (M. niger)
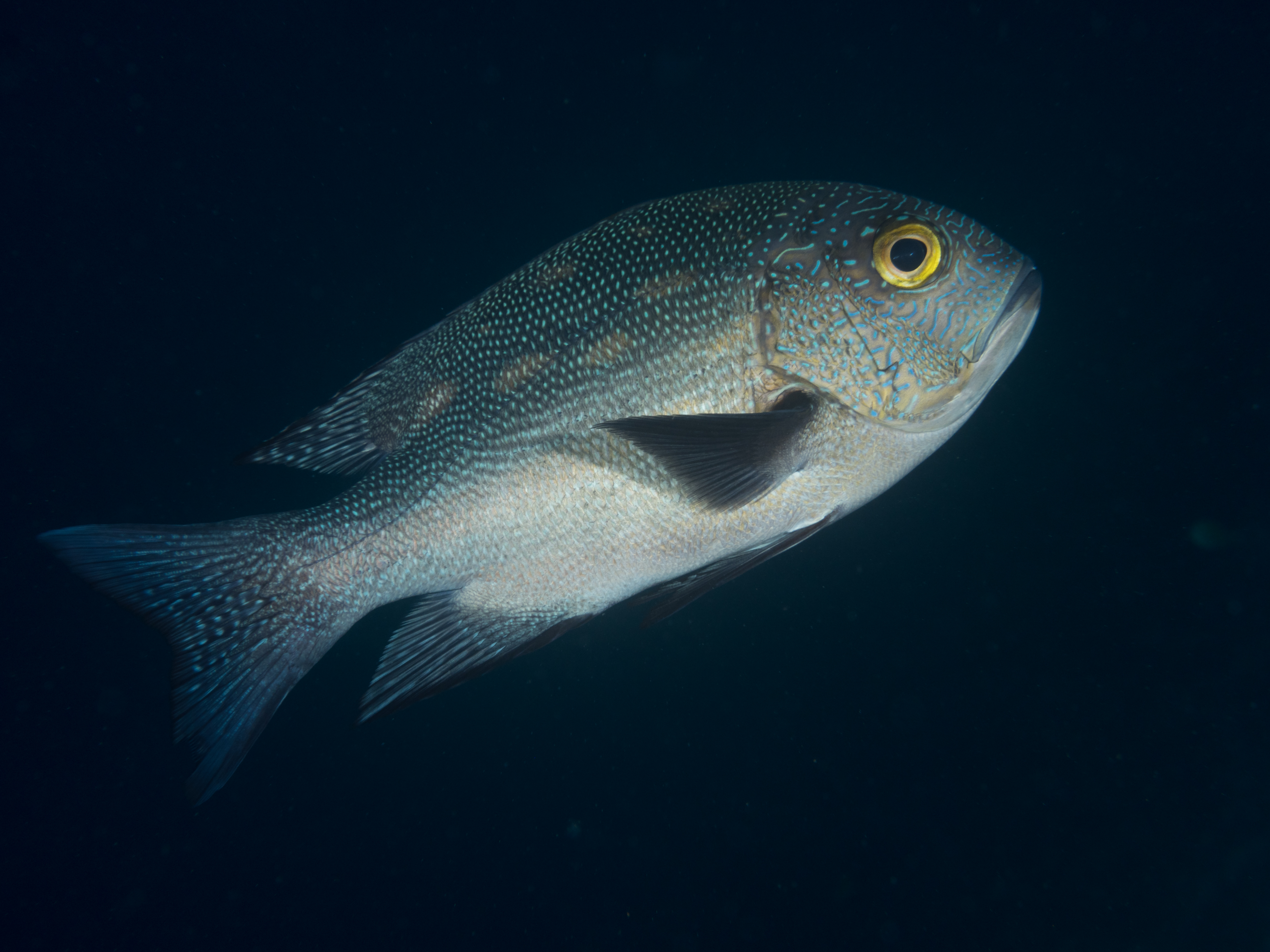
- Midnight snapper (M. macularis)

Scientific classification
- Kingdom: Animalia
- Phylum: Chordata
- Class: Actinopterygii
- Order: Acanthuriformes
- Family: Lutjanidae
- Subfamily: Lutjaninae
- Genus: Macolor; Bleeker, 1860

Type species
- Macolor typus Bleeker, 1860

Synonyms
- Proamblys T. N. Gill, 1862

= Macolor =

Genus of ray-finned fishes

Macolor is a genus of marine ray-finned fish, snappers belonging to the family Lutjanidae. They are native to the Indian Ocean and the western Pacific Ocean.

== Taxonomy ==
Macolor was described as a genus in 1860 by the Dutch physician, herpetologist and ichthyologist Pieter Bleeker. Bleeker used the name Macolor tautonymously as the type species was Cuvier’s Diacope macolor which Bleeker renamed, needlessly, Macolor typus. The name may be derived from macula, Latin for “spot” a reference to the white spotting on the otherwise black body of the juveniles of M. niger. The genus is placed within the subfamily Lutjaninae.

=== Species ===
The currently recognized species in this genus are:

Species	Common name	Adult colouration	Juvenile colouration
Macolor macularis Fowler, 1931	midnight snapper		
Macolor niger (Forsskål, 1775)	black and white snapper		

== Characteristics ==
Macolor snappers are medium-sized with a relatively deep, oblong body. They have quite a large mouth which can be ptrotracted. Each jaw has an outer band of conical teeth which are enlarged into canine-like teeth at the front, on the inside of these are bands of bristle-like teeth, at the side in the upper jaw and set anteriorly in the lower jaw. The vomerine teeth are arranged a rough chevron there is no a median posterior extension. There is a deep incision on the lower edge of preopercle. The dorsal fin is continuous, there is no incision where the spiny and soft rayed part of the fin meet. The spiny part has 10 spines while the soft rayed part has 13 or 14 rays. The anal fin has 3 spines and 10 or 11 soft rays. Both the dorsal and anal fins are scaled. The pectoral fins are relatively elongate, roughly equal to the length of the head in adults The caudal fin is emarginate. The overall colour of the adults is largely blackish with a paler abdomen. They may have wavy dark lines on the head. The juveniles show a contrasting pattern of black with white spots on the back and flanks with a white underside and there is a black bar running through the eye.

== Distribution and habitat ==
Macolor snappers are found in the Indian and Western Pacific Oceans from the eastern coast of Africa east to Samoa, north to the Ryukyu Islands and south to Australia. They are an obvious part of the coral reefs within their range. These fish have a depth range of 5 to 40 m (16 to 131 ft), although they have been recorded as deep as 90 m (300 ft).

== Biology ==
Macolor snappers occur as adults as both solitary individuals and in schools while the juveniles are frequently observed near crinoids. Like other snappers they are predatory and their prey is mostly fishes and crustaceans.

== Fisheries ==
Macolor snappers are considered to be good eating and are frequently encountered in fish markets but in small numbers. They are typically sold fresh.
