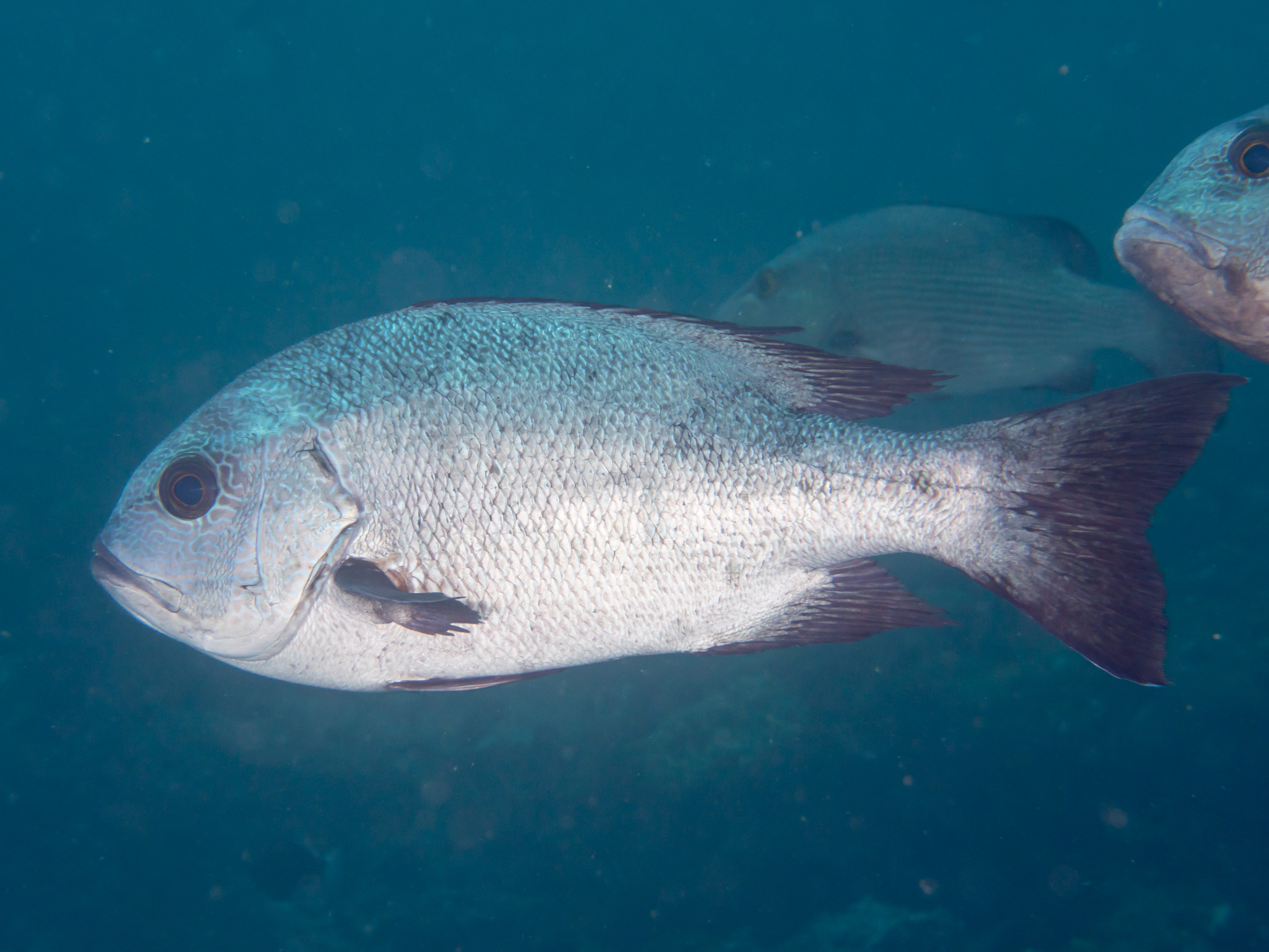

Conservation status
- Least Concern (IUCN 3.1)

Scientific classification
- Kingdom: Animalia
- Phylum: Chordata
- Class: Actinopterygii
- Order: Acanthuriformes
- Family: Lutjanidae
- Genus: Macolor
- Species: M. niger

Binomial name
- Macolor niger (Forsskål, 1775)

Synonyms
- Sciaena nigra Forsskål, 1775; Diacope macolor Lesson, 1827; Macolor macolor (Lesson, 1827); Macolor typus Bleeker, 1860

= Black and white snapper =

Species of fish

The black and white snapper (Macolor niger), the black and white seaperch or black snapper, is a species of marine ray-finned fish, a snapper belonging to the family Lutjanidae. It is native to the Indian Ocean and the western Pacific Ocean.

== Taxonomy ==
The black and white snapper was first formally described in 1775 as Sciaena nigra by the Swedish speaking Finnish-born explorer and naturalist Peter Forsskål with the type locality given as Jeddah. The specific name niger means "black", a reference to the blackish colour of the adults. When the genus Macolor was described in 1860, by the Dutch physician, herpetologist and ichthyologist, Pieter Bleeker, he used the name Macolor tautonymously, for the type species which was Cuvier's Diacope macolor. Bleeker needlessly renamed D. macolor, Macolor typus.

== Distribution and habitat ==
The black and white snapper has a wide Indo-Pacific range. It occurs along the eastern coastline of Africa from the Red Sea south as far as South Africa, the Seychelles, islands in the Mozambique Channel, Madagascar and western Mascarenes, east to the Maldives, Laccadives, the Chagos Islands, Cocos (Keeling) Islands and Christmas Island and Sri Lanka. In the Pacific it occurs from western Malaysia, western Indonesia and the Andaman Sea east to the Marshall Islands, Samoa and Tonga south to Australia north to central Japan. It has also recorded from Niue and the Cook Islands. It is found at depths between 2 and 90 m (6 ft 7 in and 295 ft 3 in) around the steep outer slopes of lagoon reefs, channels and on the seaward slopes.

== Description ==
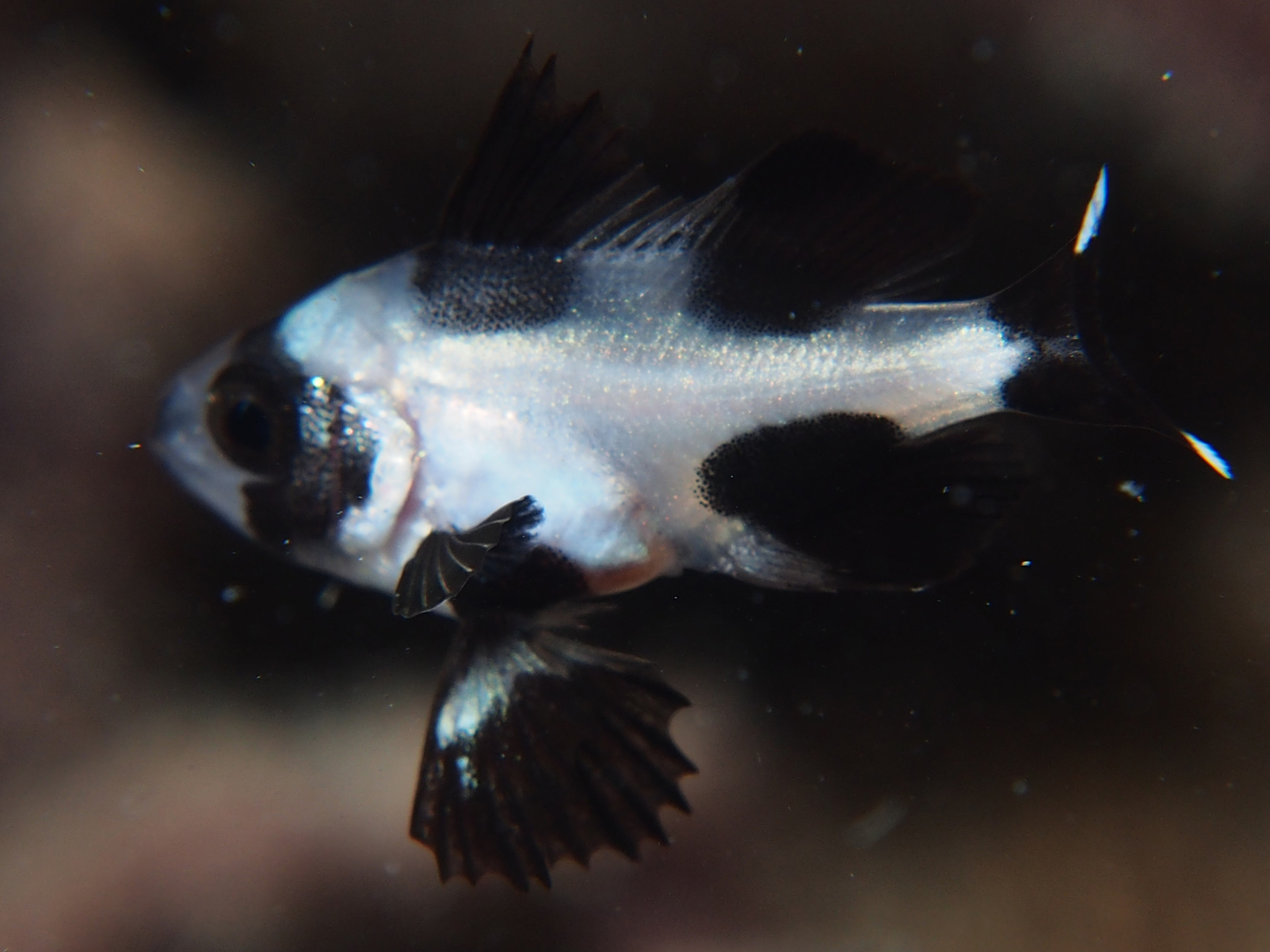
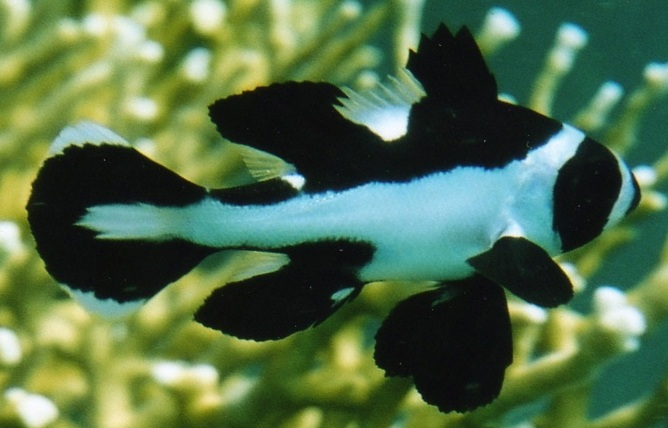
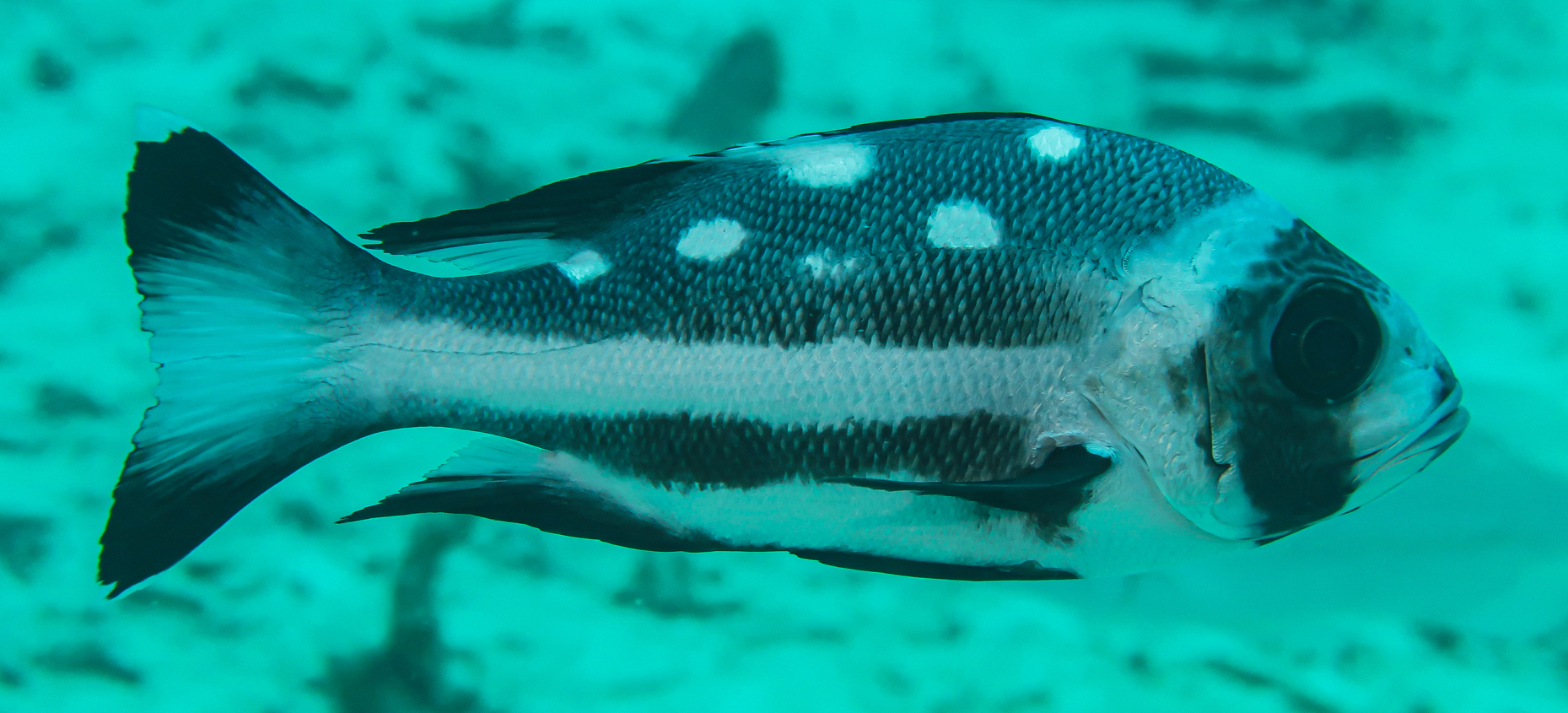
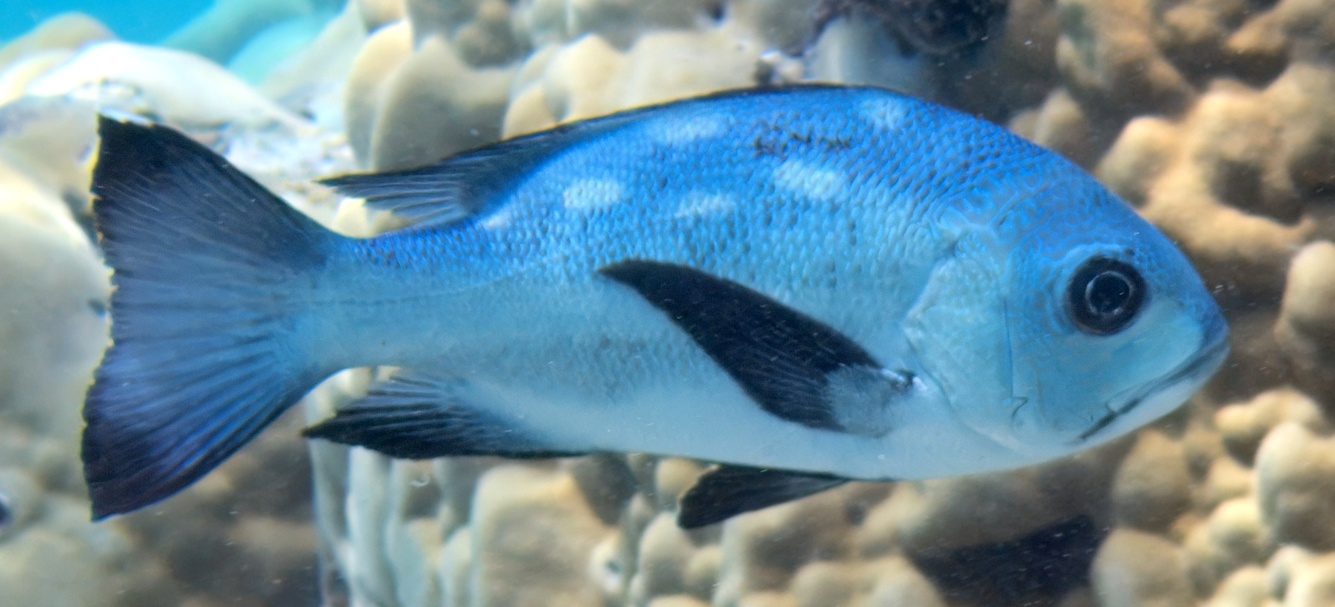
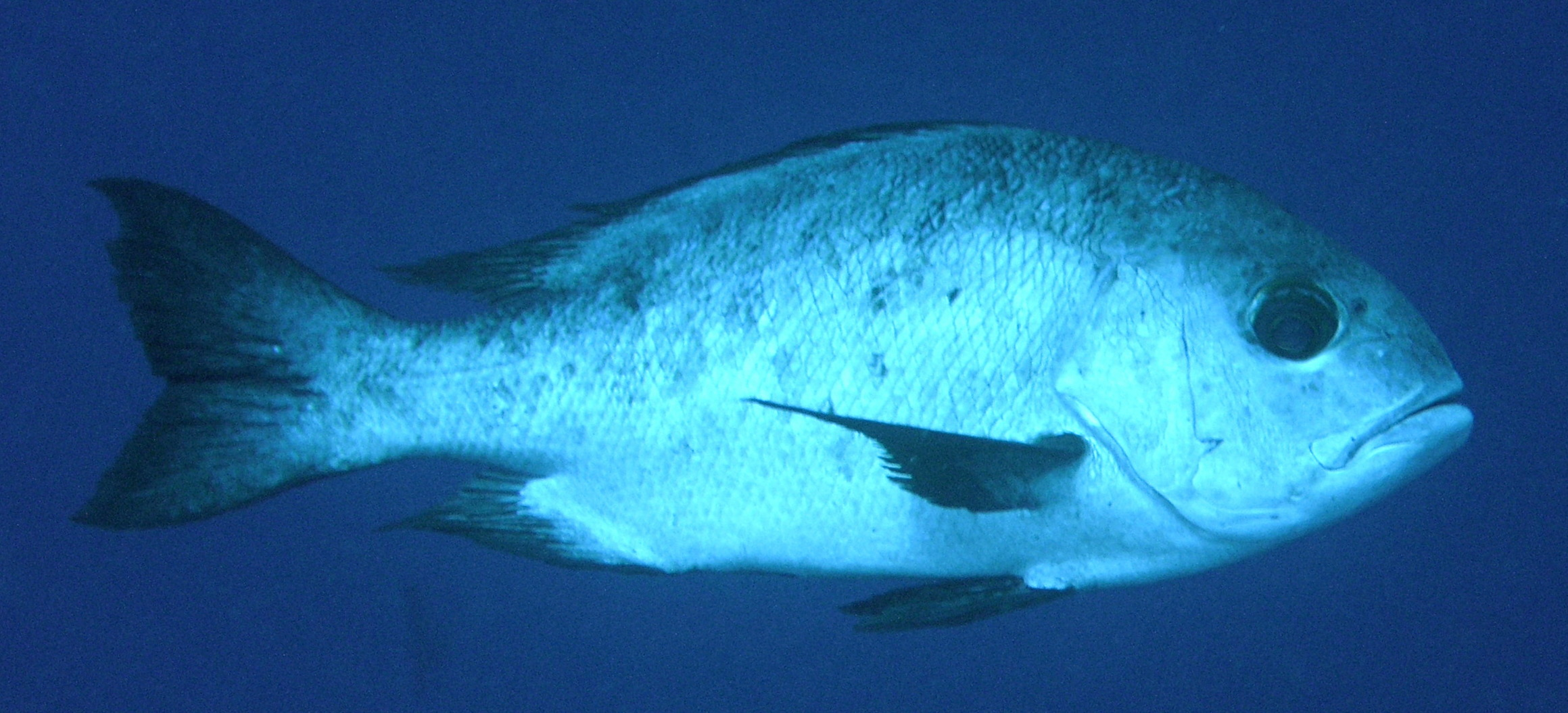
Growth series (from youngest juvenile to adult)

The black and white snapper can reach a maximum total length of 75 cm (30 in), though most do not exceed 35 cm (14 in). Its fins and eyes are black and its body varies in color from light grey to black depending on age. Juveniles are typically striped, changing in complete black when adult.

The black and white snapper has a relatively deep body. It has a convex dorsal profile of the head and a large mouth which extends back to the front of the eye. Each jaw has an outer band of conical teeth which are enlarged into canine-like teeth at the front, on the inside of these are bands of bristle-like teeth, at the side in the upper jaw and set anteriorly in the lower jaw. The vomerine teeth are arranged a rough chevron with no a median posterior extension. There is a deep incision on the lower margin of the preoperculum. The dorsal fin contains 10 spines and 13–15 soft rays while the anal fin has 3 spines and 10–11 soft rays. The rear tips of both the dorsal and anal fins are clearly pointed. The pectoral fins are long, extending as far as the anus, containing 17–18 fin rays and the caudal fin is emarginate.

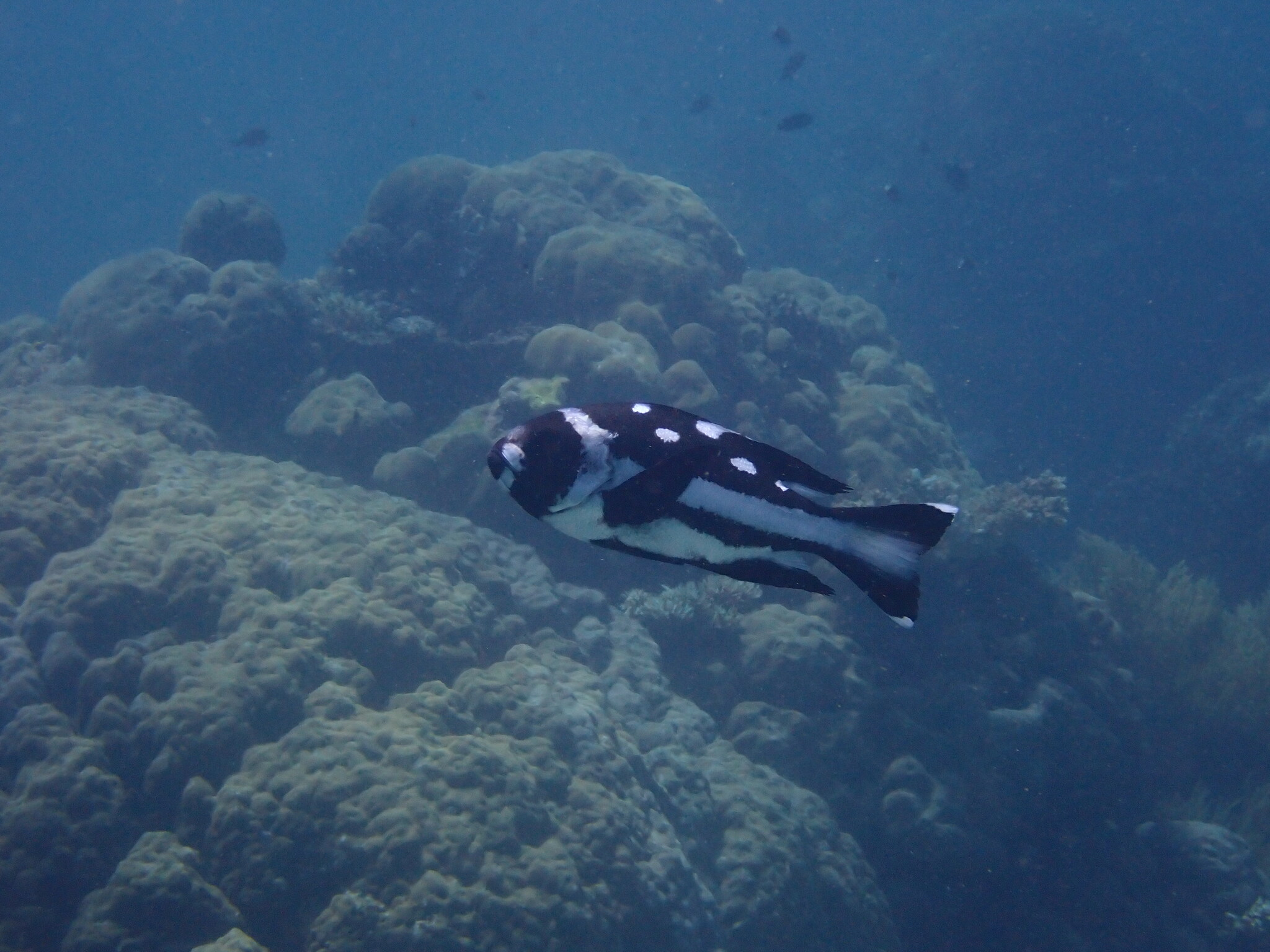
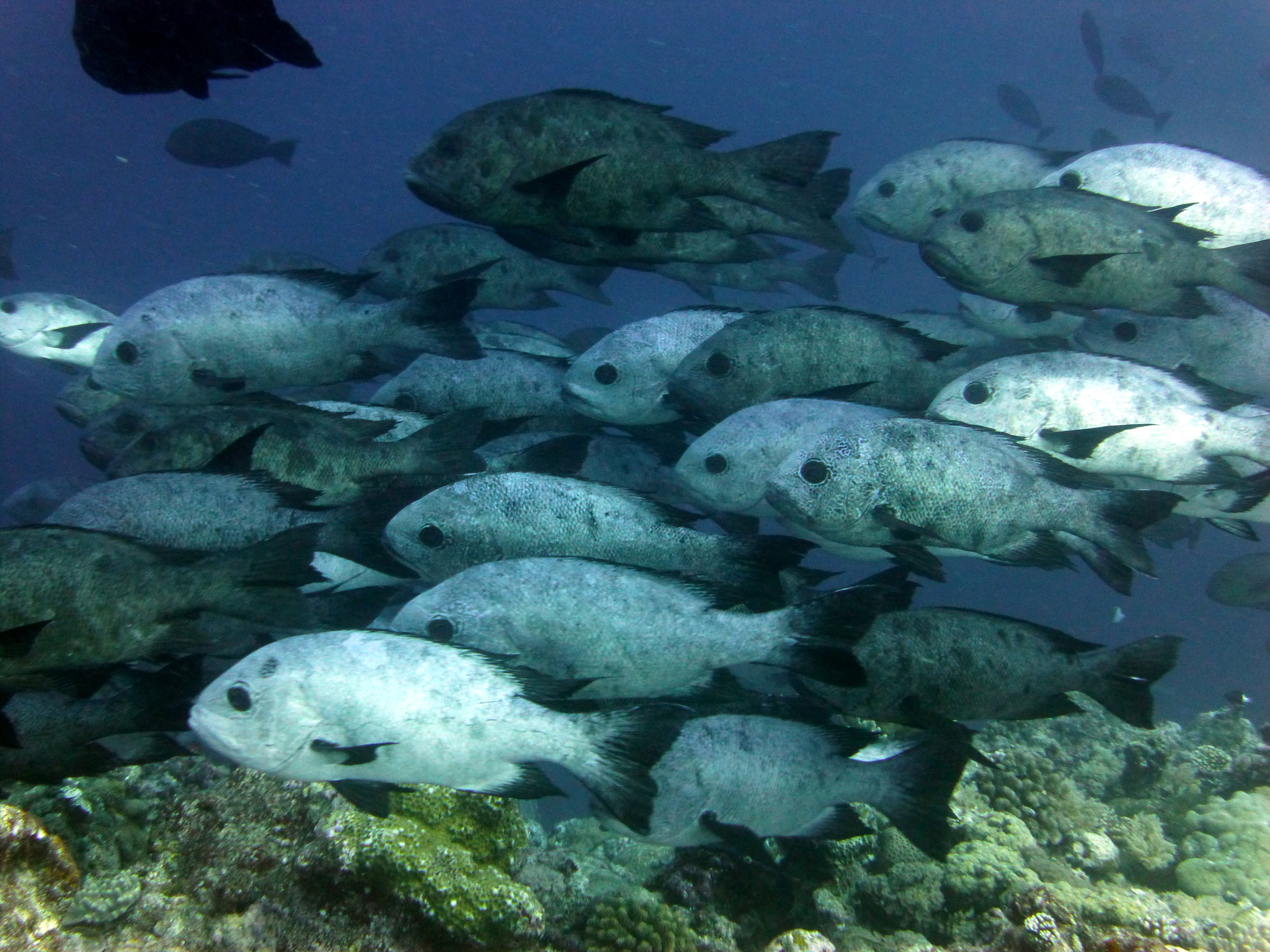
Juveniles are solitary (top), while adults form schools (bottom)

== Biology ==
The black and white snapper are solitary as juveniles, while adults aggregate in large schools. It is a predatory fish which preys on fishes and crustaceans. This species gathers in aggregations to spawn. This species is frequently confused with its congener the midnight snapper (M. macularis) with which it is known to form mixed aggregations.

== Fisheries ==
Black and white snapper are prized as food fish and are caught commercially, as well as recreationally. This species can also be found in the aquarium trade.
