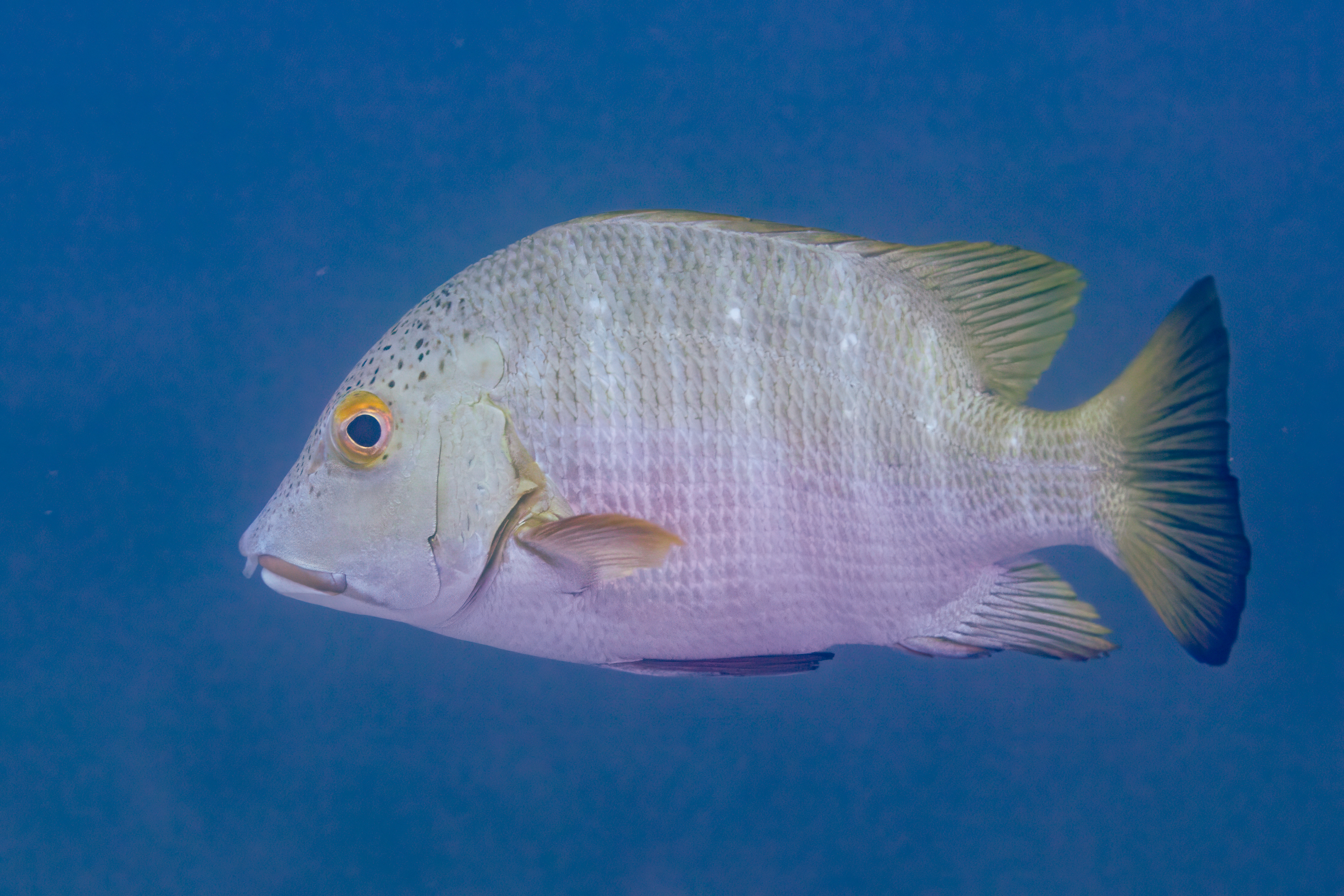
- La Paz, Baja California Sur, Mexico

Conservation status
- Least Concern (IUCN 3.1)

Scientific classification
- Kingdom: Animalia
- Phylum: Chordata
- Class: Actinopterygii
- Order: Acanthuriformes
- Family: Lutjanidae
- Subfamily: Lutjaninae
- Genus: Hoplopagrus; T. N. Gill, 1861
- Species: H. guentherii

Binomial name
- Hoplopagrus guentherii T. N. Gill, 1862

Synonyms
- For genus: Deuteracanthus Fowler, 1944; For species: Deuteracanthus lonchophorus Fowler, 1944

= Mexican barred snapper =

Species of fish

The Mexican barred snapper (Hoplopagrus guentherii), also known as the barred pargo, is a species of marine ray-finned fish, a snapper belonging to the family Lutjanidae. It is native to the eastern Pacific Ocean. It is the only species in its genus.

== Taxonomy ==
The Mexican barred snapper was first formally described in 1862 by the American ichthyologist Theodore Nicholas Gill with the type locality given as Baja California. The genus Hoplopagrus is monotypic, H. guentheri is its only species. Gill did not explain the etymology of the name of the genus is thought to be a compound of hoplo meaning "armed", a reference to the serrated preoperculum, and pagrus, meaning "porgy", as this taxon was assumed to be intermediate between snappers and the porgies of the family Sparidae. The specific name honours the German born British ichthyologist Albert Günther.

Hypsocephalus, an extinct snapper from the Late Eocene of Florida, US, is thought to be the sister genus to the extant Hoplopagrus, based on their very similar skull morphologies. The presence of Hypsocephalus in the Atlantic region suggests that during the Paleogene, relatives of Hoplopagrus had a much wider distribution on both the tropical Pacific and Atlantic coasts of the Americas, followed by a presumed range contraction to the Pacific due to global cooling and sea level falls.

== Description ==
The Mexican barred snapper has a moderately compressed deep body, the deepest body of all the snappers being 44-46% as deep as it is long. The preoperculum is strongly incised and has an obvious knob. It has a long anterior, tubular nostril which points downwards while the posterior nostril is set in a relatively long deep groove in front of the eye. The jaws are equipped with a band of robust molar-like teeth, and there are several similar vomerine teeth but no teeth on the tongue. The dorsal fin has 10 spines and 14 soft rays while the anal fin contains 3 spines and 9 soft rays, there are scales on the bases of both these fins. The long pectoral fins extend past the level of the anus and contain 16-17 rays. The overall colour is reddish-brown, browner on the head with a white chin. There are six alternating broad and slender vertical white bars on their flanks. The juveniles are marked with closely paired bars on their flanks and a black spot on the base of the dorsal fin rays. This species attains a maximum total length of 92 cm (36 in), although 50 cm (20 in) is more typical, and the maximum published weight is 9.6 kg (21 lb).

== Distribution and habitat ==
The Mexican barred snapper is endemic to the Eastern Pacific Ocean. Its range extends from southern Baja California and the northern Gulf of California south to Ecuador. It is also found around the Galapagos, Malpelo and the Cocos Islands. It occurs at depths between 3 and 50 m (9.8 and 164.0 ft). The adults are found in rocky areas near coral reefs, also in caves. Juveniles can be found in rocky tidal pools.

== Biology ==
The Mexican barred snapper is a nocturnal predator on other fishes and crustaceans, emerging at night from their day shelters in caves and crevices to hunt during the night. Very little is known about the biology of this species.

== Fisheries ==
The Mexican barred snapper is of some importance to subsistence fisheries and is caught using Gill nets and hook and line. The catch is usually sold fresh.
