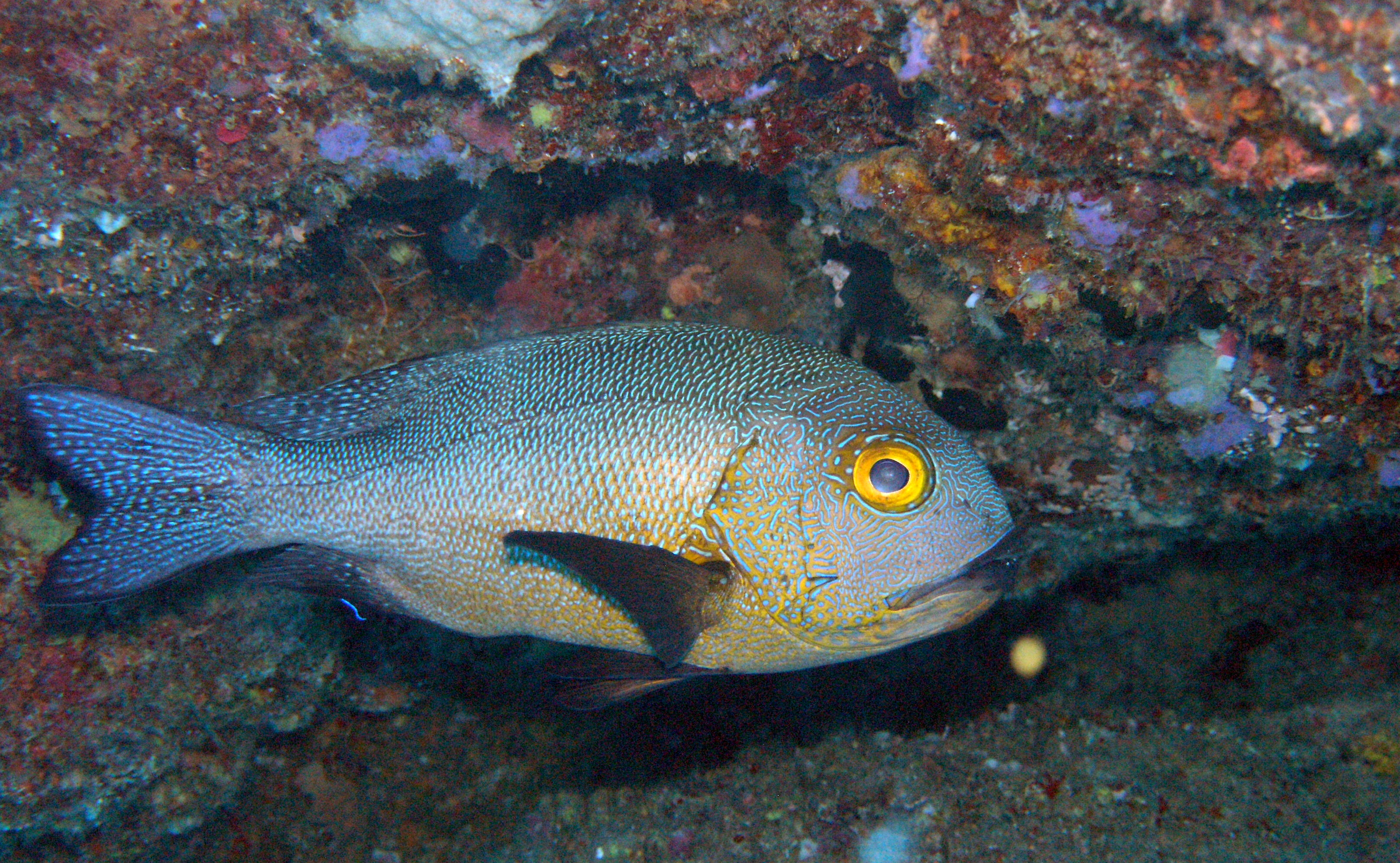

Conservation status
- Least Concern (IUCN 3.1)

Scientific classification
- Kingdom: Animalia
- Phylum: Chordata
- Class: Actinopterygii
- Order: Acanthuriformes
- Family: Lutjanidae
- Genus: Macolor
- Species: M. macularis

Binomial name
- Macolor macularis Fowler, 1931

= Macolor macularis =

Species of fish

Macolor macularis, the midnight snapper, midnight seaperch or black and white snapper, is a species of marine ray-finned fish, a snapper belonging to the family Lutjanidae. It is native to the Indian and western Pacific Oceans.

== Taxonomy ==
Macolor macularis was first formally described in 1931 by the American ichthyologist Henry Weed Fowler with the type locality given as near Ragay Gulf on Luzon. The specific name macularis means "spotted", presumed to be a reference to the description stating "most every scale with gray or blue spot".

== Distribution and habitat ==
Macolor macularis has a wide Indo-West Pacific range which is not well known because of confusion with Macolor niger. It has been found in the Chagos Islands and the Maldives and southwestern India. In the Pacific it is found from the Andaman Sea and Sumatra east to Samoa and the Phoenix Islands, north to Taiwan and the Yaeyama Islands of southern Japan and south to Australia. In Australian waters this species is found from the offshore reefs in northern Western Australia, the Ashmore Reef in the Timor Sea, the Arafura Sea in the Northern Territory, and the Great Barrier Reef of Queensland. It also occurs around the reefs of the Coral Sea and at Christmas Island.

The adults occur over steep slopes of lagoon, channel, or seaward reefs, they are commonly found on deep reef slopes. Juveniles live solitarily on sheltered reef slopes with crinoids, in staghorn coral or large sponges.

== Description ==
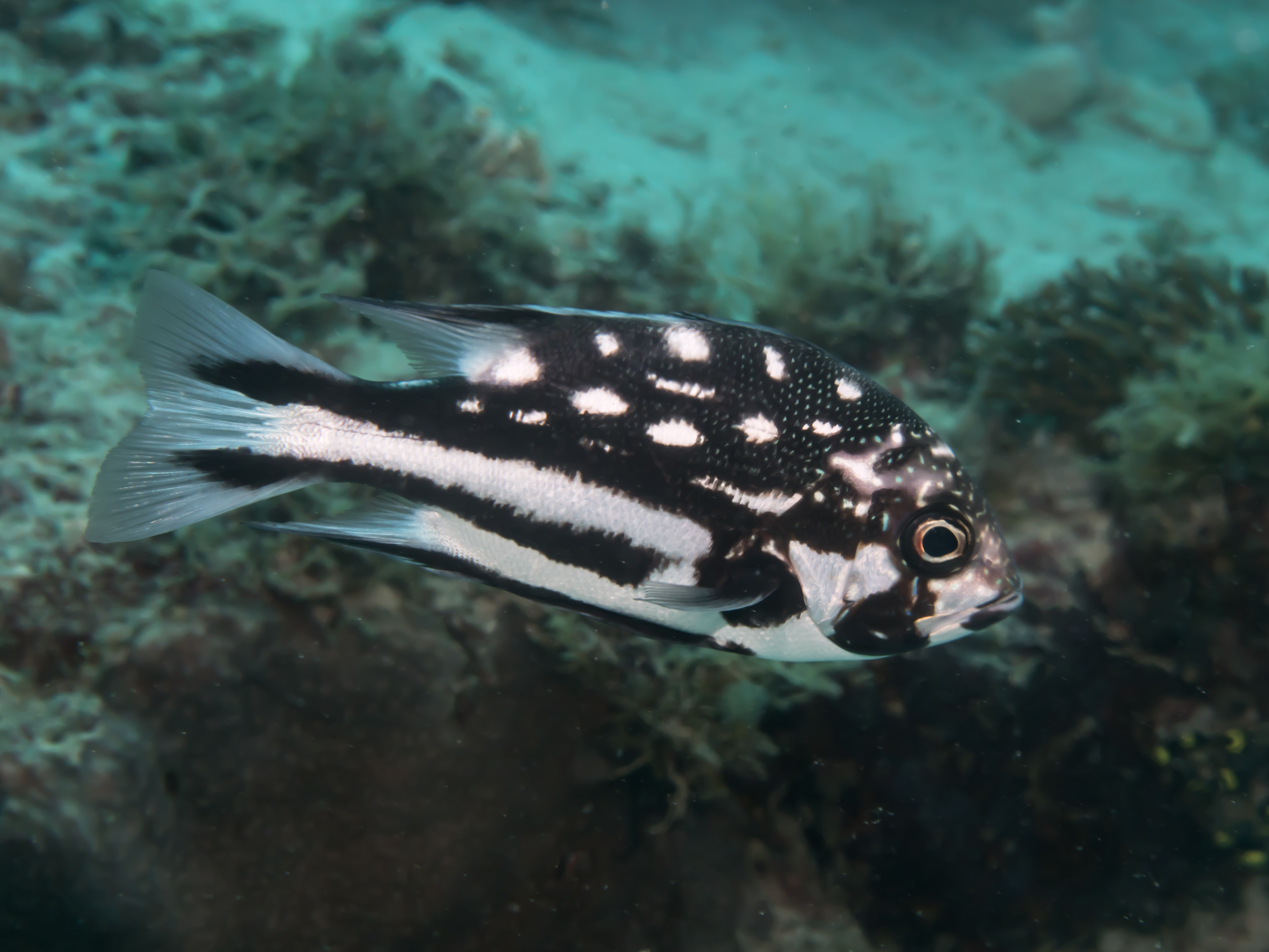
In the Philippines

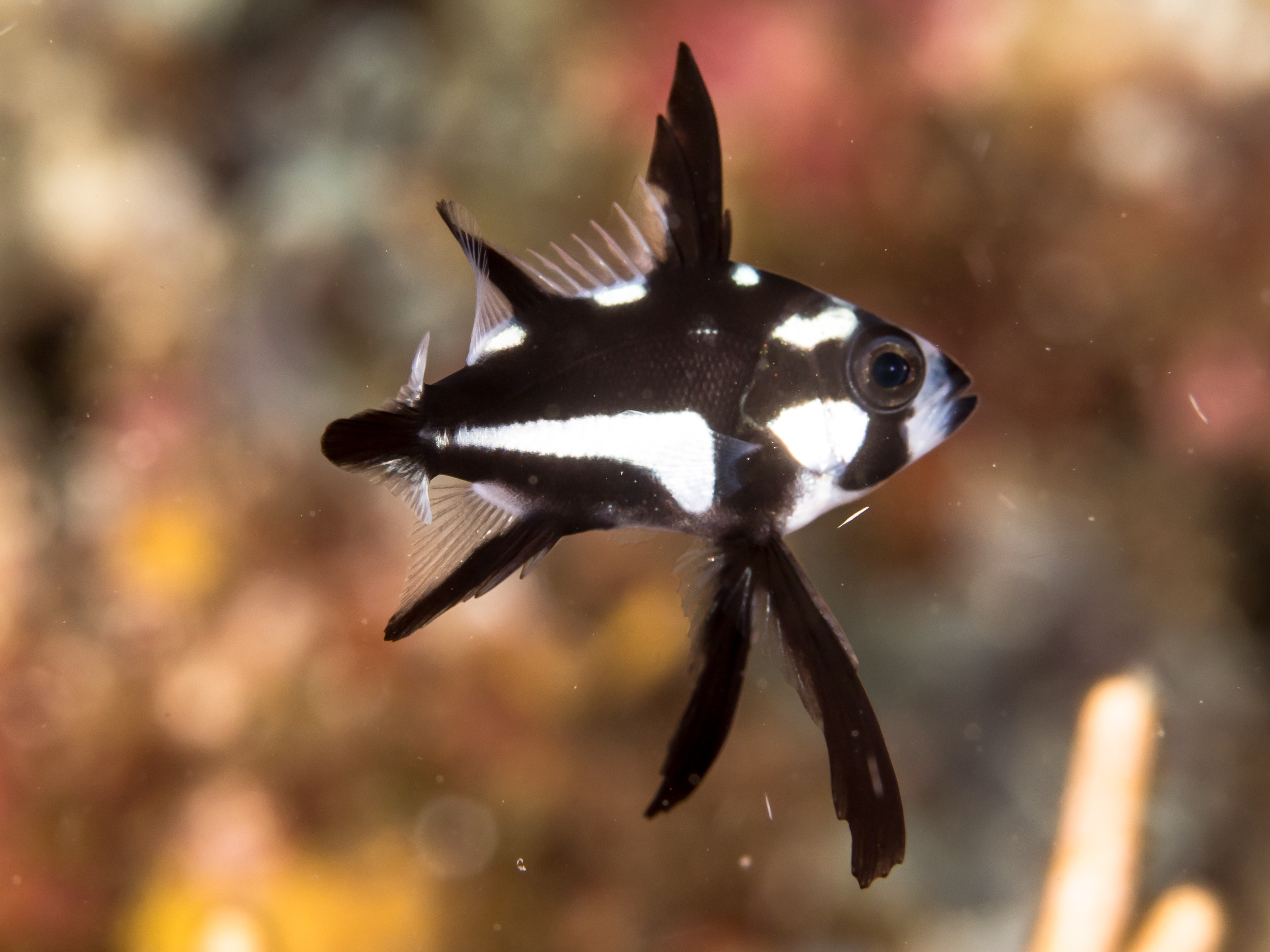
Young juvenile, in Indonesia

Macolor macularis attains a maximum total length of 60 cm (24 in). The overall colour of adults is dark grey brown on the upper body shading to yellow on head and lower body. There are thin blue lines and small spots on the head. The scales on the body have blue lines or dashes. The juveniles have a piebald pattern of black and white including five white spots on the back. Subadult are similar to juveniles but with many more white spots on the back and small white spots in the other black areas. The smaller adults show traces of the juvenile patterning.

This species has a moderately deep body with a rather convex forehead with a large mouth. The preoperculum has a deep incision on its lower margin. There is a row of conical teeth in the jaws, the ones in the front are enlarged and there are bands of bristle-like teeth on sides of upper jaw and front of lower jaw inside the outer row. The vomerine teeth are arranged in a roughly chevron shaped patch. The dorsal fin has 10 spines and 13-14 soft rays while the anal fin contains 3 spines and 10soft rays. The rear tips of the dorsal and anal fins clearly pointed. The long pectoral fins extend as far as the level of the anus and has 17 or 18 fin rays. The caudal fin is emarginate. The smaller juveniles, those with a standard length of around 20 cm (7.9 in) or less have very elongated pelvic fins.

== Biology ==
Macolor macularis is a nocturnal predatory species which feeds on larger zooplankton, fishes and crustaceans. It can be found as a solitary fish or in schools, sometimes in mixed schools with M. niger. It is a long lived fish with many attaining ages of 40–50 years, the oldest was a fish from Rowley Shoals in Western Australia which was known to be 81 years old.

== Fisheries ==
Macolor macularis is often recorded in fish markets, largely as fresh fish. Fishers catch them using handlines, gill nets, traps and by spearfishing.
