= John Edward Gray =

British zoologist (1800–1875)

John Edward Gray FRS
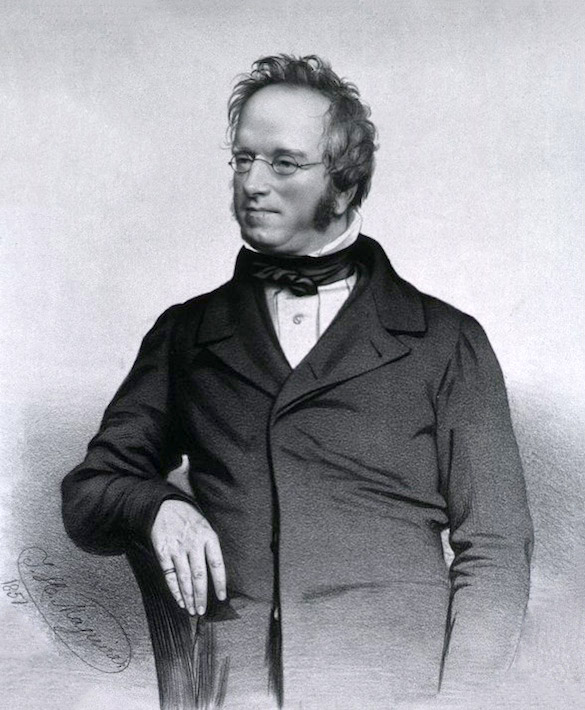
- Gray in 1851
- Born: 12 February 1800; Walsall, Staffordshire, England
- Died: 7 March 1875 (aged 75); London, England
- Resting place: St Mary's Church, Lewisham
- Known for: Classification of many cetacean species, genera, subfamilies, and families
- Spouse: Maria Emma Smith (m. 1826)
- Parent: Samuel Frederick Gray
- Relatives: George Robert Gray (brother)
- Scientific career
- Fields: Zoology
- Workplaces: British Museum, Natural History Museum
- Author abbrev. (botany): J.E.Gray
- Author abbrev. (zoology): Gray or J. E. Gray

John Edward Gray FRS (12 February 1800 – 7 March 1875) was a British zoologist. He was the elder brother of zoologist George Robert Gray and son of the pharmacologist and botanist Samuel Frederick Gray (1766–1828). The standard author abbreviation J.E.Gray is used to indicate this person as the author when citing a botanical name. The same is used for a zoological name.

Gray was keeper of zoology at the British Museum in London from 1840 until Christmas 1874, before the natural history holdings were split off to the Natural History Museum. He published several catalogues of the museum collections that included comprehensive discussions of animal groups and descriptions of new species. He improved the zoological collections to make them amongst the best in the world.

== Biography ==
Gray was born in Walsall, but his family soon moved to London, where Gray studied medicine. He assisted his father in writing The Natural Arrangement of British Plants (1821). After being blackballed by the Linnean Society of London, Gray shifted his interest from botany to zoology. He began his zoological career by volunteering to collect insects for the British Museum at age 15. He officially joined the Zoological Department in 1824 to help John George Children catalog the reptile collection. In some of his early articles, Gray adopted William Sharp Macleay's quinarian system for classifications of molluscs (1824), butterflies (1824), echinoderms (1825), reptiles (1825), and mammals (1825). In 1840, he took over Children's position as keeper of zoology, which he held for 35 years, publishing well over 1,000 papers. He named many cetacean species, genera, subfamilies, and families.

During this period, he collaborated with Benjamin Waterhouse Hawkins, the noted natural history artist, in producing Gleanings from the Menagerie at Knowsley. The menagerie at Knowsley Hall, near Liverpool, founded by Edward Smith-Stanley, 13th Earl of Derby, at the Stanley ancestral seat, was one of the largest private menageries in Victorian England.

Gray married Maria Emma Smith in 1826. She helped him with his scientific work, especially with her drawings.

In 1833, Gray was a founder of what became the Royal Entomological Society.

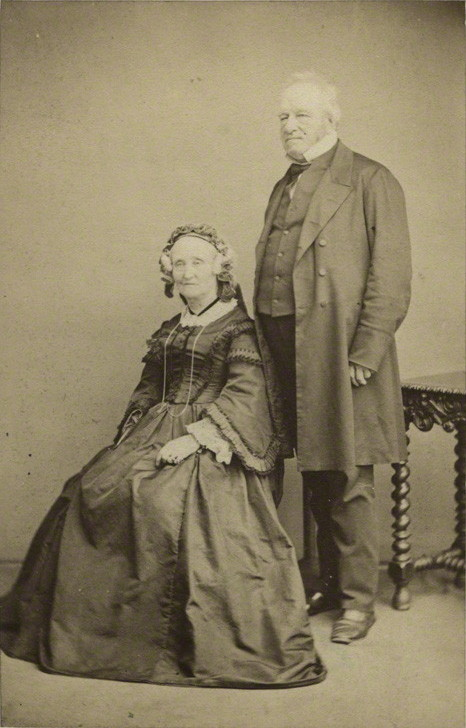
Gray with his wife Maria Emma, 1863

Gray was a friend of coleopterist Hamlet Clark, and in 1856–57 they sailed on Gray's yacht Miranda to Spain, Algeria, and Brazil. Gray was an accomplished watercolourist, and his landscape paintings illustrate Clark's account of their journeys.

Gray was also interested in postage stamps. On 1 May 1840, the day the Penny Black first went on sale, he purchased several with the intent to save them.

During his 50 years employed at the British Museum, Gray wrote nearly 500 papers, including many descriptions of species new to science. These had been presented to the museum by collectors from around the world, and included all branches of zoology, although Gray usually left the descriptions of new birds to his younger brother and colleague George. Gray was also active in malacology, the study of molluscs. He was an associate of entomologist Eliza Fanny Staveley, supporting her research and reading papers she had prepared to the Linnean and Zoological Societies of London.

John Edward Gray was buried at St Mary's Church, Lewisham.

== Taxa named by him and in his honour ==
Gray was one of the most prolific taxonomists in the history of zoology. He described more than 300 species and subspecies of reptiles, only surpassed by his successors at the British Museum, George A. Boulenger and Albert Günther and American zoologist Edward D. Cope.

Gray described and named numerous marine snails including:

- The genus Lithopoma Gray, 1850
- The genus Euthria Gray, 1850

Genera named in his honour include:

- The snake genus Grayia Günther, 1858

Species and subspecies named in his honour include:

- Ardeola grayii (Sykes, 1832) – Indian pond heron
- Mesoplodon grayi von Haast, 1876 – Gray's beaked whale
- Crocidura grayi Dobson, 1890 – Luzon shrew
- Ablepharus grayanus (Stoliczka, 1872)
- Delma grayii A. Smith, 1849
- Microlophus grayii (Bell, 1843)
- Naultinus grayii Bell, 1843
- Salvelinus grayi Günther, 1862
- Tropidophorus grayi Günther, 1861
- Trachemys venusta grayi (Bocourt, 1868)
- Gray's pipefish, also known as the mud pipefish or spiny pipefish Halicampus grayi is named after him.

== See also ==
- "The New Museum Idea"
