= Eliza Fanny Staveley =

British entomologist and author

- Born: 1831; Kensington, London
- Died: 1903 (aged 71–72); Royal Tunbridge Wells
- Other names: E.F. Staveley
- Occupations: Entomologist, arachnologist, author
- Notable work: British spiders: an introduction to the study of the Araneidae of Great Britain and Ireland (1866); British insects: a familiar description of the form, structure, habits, and transformations of insects (1871)

Eliza Fanny Staveley (1831–1903), published as E.F. Staveley, was a British entomologist, arachnologist, and author. She was "the first woman to contribute significantly to arachnology in Britain" and the spider genus Staveleya was named after her. Her work British Insects (1871) was favourably reviewed by Alfred Russel Wallace in Nature.

== Life ==
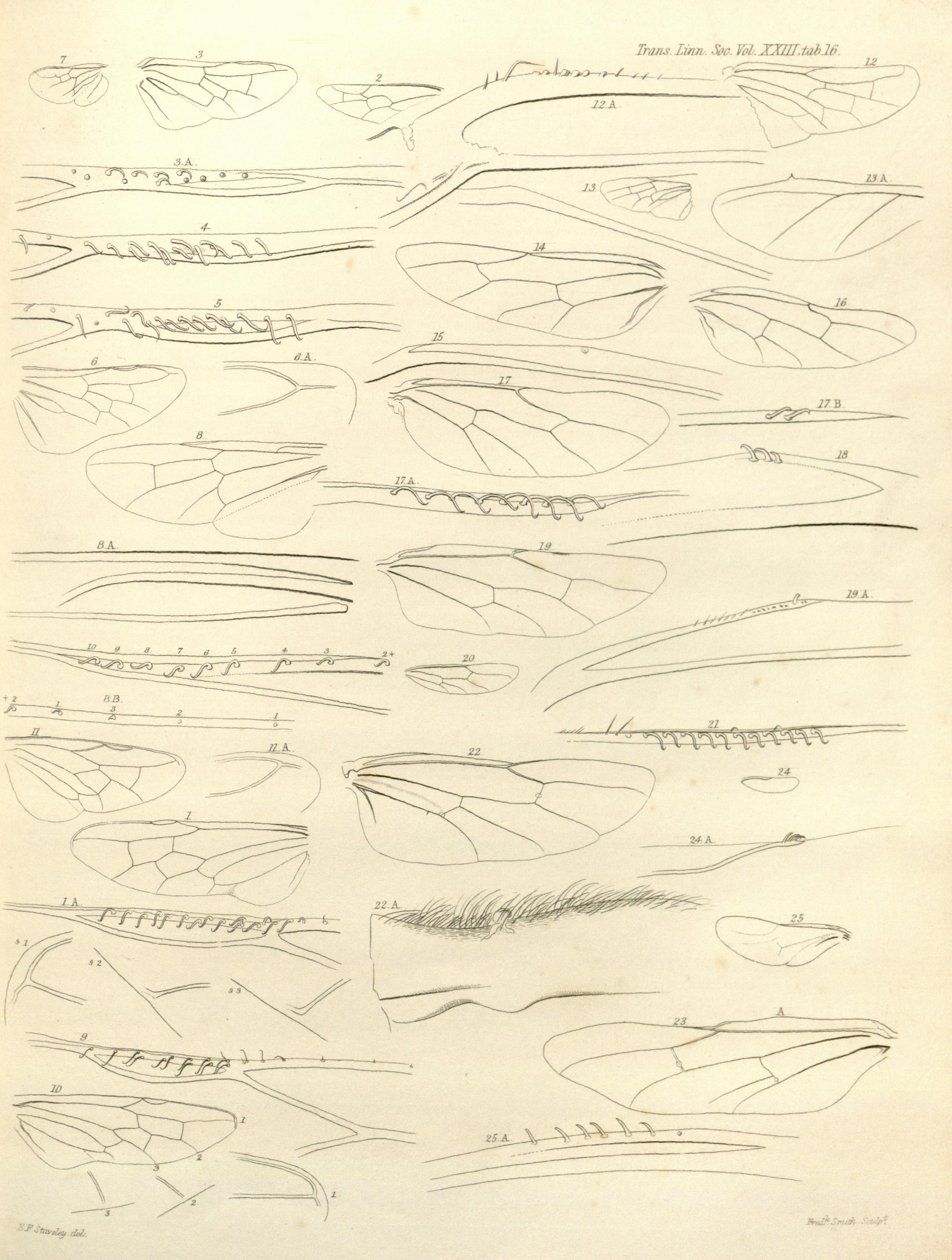
Insect wings, illustrating a paper prepared by E.F. Staveley and read to the Linnean Society of London on 21 June 1860.

Eliza Fanny Staveley was born in Kensington, London in 1831, to Thomas Staveley and Eliza Wowski (née Dickenson).

During the 1860s, Staveley conducted anatomical studies of spiders and hymenopterous insects, focusing particularly on the study of hooks on insect wings and teeth in spiders. Entomologist Frederick Smith, who worked in the zoology department of the British Museum, assisted Staveley in providing a collection of wings for study. Staveley was an associate of naturalist John Edward Gray, who read papers she had prepared to the Linnean and Zoological Societies of London.

Following the publication of British Insects in 1871, naturalist Alfred Russel Wallace reviewed the work for the journal Nature. He wrote that he could:

conscientiously recommend this book as admirably adapted to lead its readers to observe for themselves the varied phenomena presented by insects, and thus to become true entomologists.

Horticulturist Theresa Earle also wrote favourably of her 1866 work British Spiders, describing it as:

a very good book... which would tell all that anyone might want to know about these insects. The first page illustrates spiders' heads, with the varying numbers of eyes the different kinds possess.

That book "continued to be the mainstay for naturalists and collectors for at least 60 years after publication" and "can arguably be regarded as the first, true field guide to British spiders".

Eliza Fanny Staveley died in 1903 in Tunbridge Wells, aged 72.

== Works ==
As listed on the Biodiversity Heritage Library:

- 'Observations on the neuration of the hind wings of Hymenopterous insects: and on the hooks which join the fore and hind wings together in flight' (1860)
- 'Notes on the Form of the Comb (Pecten) in Different Andrenidae and Apidae, and on the Alar Hooks of the Species of Sphecodes and Halictus' (1862) in Proceedings of the Zoological Society of London
- British spiders: an introduction to the study of the Araneidae of Great Britain and Ireland (1866)
- 'Note on the presence of teeth on the Maxillæ of Spiders' (1866) in The Annals and magazine of natural history; zoology, botany, and geology Vol. 17, No. 3
- British Insects: a familiar description of the form, structure, habits, and transformations of insects (1871)
