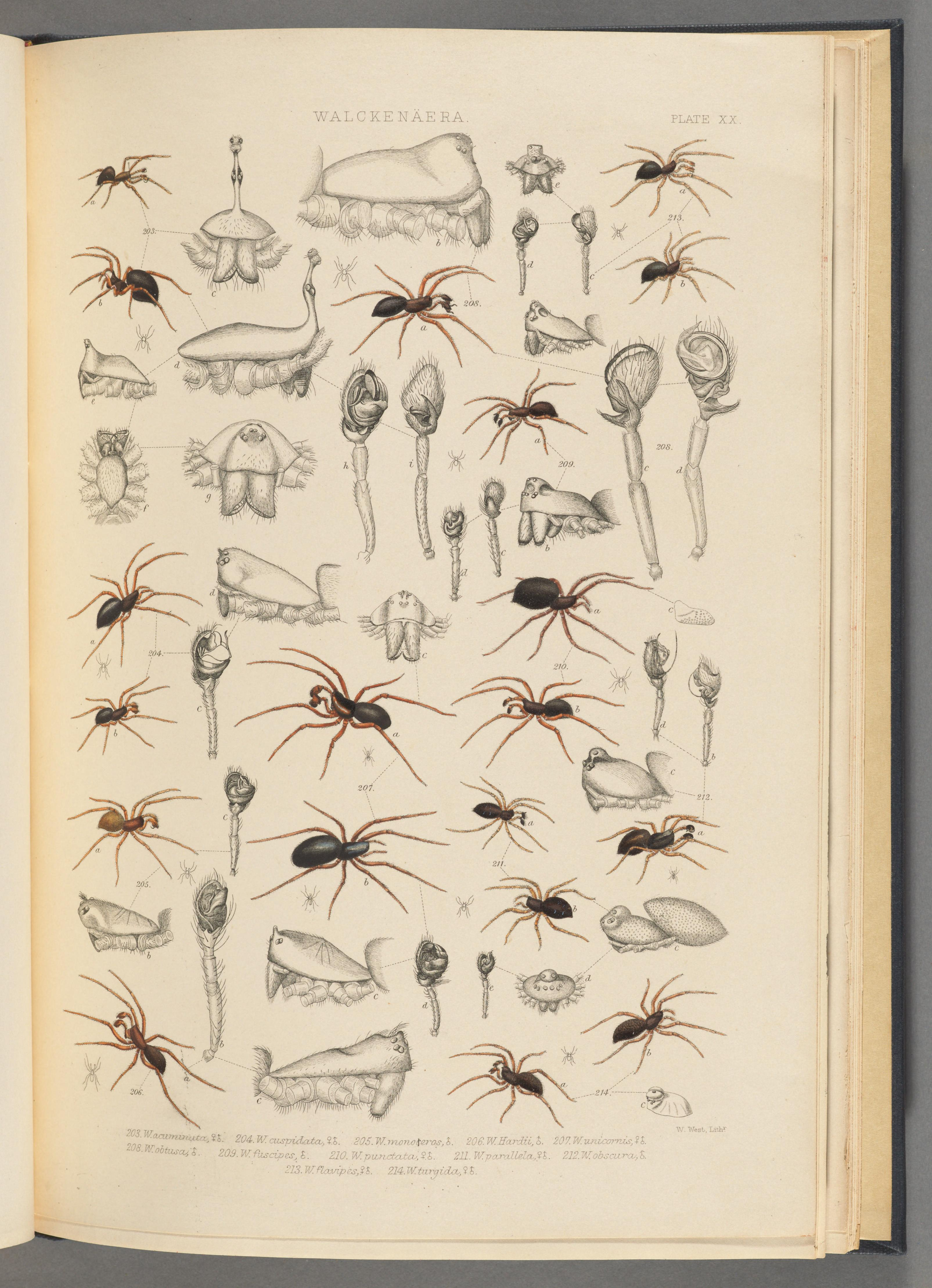
- Cnephalocotes obscurus figure 212

Scientific classification
- Kingdom: Animalia
- Phylum: Arthropoda
- Subphylum: Chelicerata
- Class: Arachnida
- Order: Araneae
- Infraorder: Araneomorphae
- Family: Linyphiidae
- Genus: Cnephalocotes; Simon, 1884

Type species
- C. obscurus (Blackwall, 1834)

Species
- C. ferrugineus Seo, 2018 – Korea; C. obscurus (Blackwall, 1834) – Canada, Europe, Russia (Europe to Far East); C. simpliciceps Simon, 1900 – Hawaii; C. tristis Denis, 1954 – France

= Cnephalocotes =

Genus of spiders

Cnephalocotes is a genus of dwarf spiders that was first described by Eugène Louis Simon in 1884. As of May 2021 it contains four species:C. ferrugineus, C. obscurus, C. simpliciceps and C. tristis.
