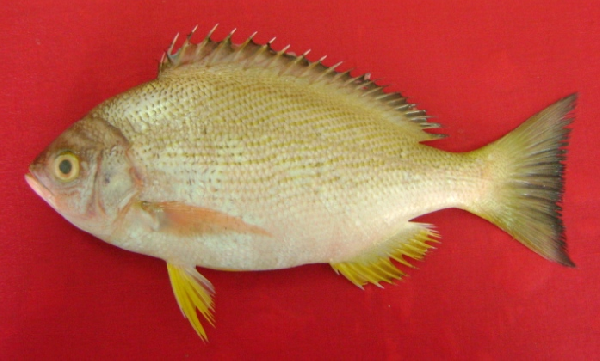

Conservation status
- Least Concern (IUCN 3.1)

Scientific classification
- Kingdom: Animalia
- Phylum: Chordata
- Class: Actinopterygii
- Order: Acanthuriformes
- Family: Lutjanidae
- Genus: Pinjalo
- Species: P. pinjalo

Binomial name
- Pinjalo pinjalo (Bleeker, 1850)

Synonyms
- Caesio pinjalo Bleeker, 1850; Odontonectes pinjalo (Bleeker, 1850); Pinjalo typus Bleeker, 1845; Mesoprion mitchelli Günther, 1867; Pinjalo microphthalmus Lee, 1987

= Pinjalo pinjalo =

Species of fish

Pinjalo pinjalo, the pinjalo, is a species of marine ray-finned fish, a snapper belonging to the family Lutjanidae. It is found in the Indian and Western Pacific Oceans.

== Taxonomy ==
Pinjalo pinjalo was first formally described in 1850 as Caesio pinjalo by the Dutch physician, herpetologist and ichthyologist Pieter Bleeker with the type locality given as Batavia on Java. The specific name derives from the Malay ikan Pinjalo, a local name for this fish around the type locality. When Bleeker created the genus Pinjalo he used the name Pinjalo typus for the type species but this proved to be a nomen nudum and Caesio pinjalo was designated as the type species by tautonymy.

== Description ==
Pinjalo pinjalo has a body which is moderately deep with a steep dorsal profile on the head and a convex space between the eyes. it has a comparatively large eye which has a diameter roughly equal or greater than the length of the snout. The eye has an adipose eyelid. The snout is relatively short and pointed, the mouth is small only extending to the front of the eye. There is a single row of small, conical teeth in jaws, these are enlarged in the front and an inner band of bristle-like teeth. The dorsal fin has 10 spines and 13-15 soft rays while the anal fin has 3 rays and 8-10 soft rays. The dorsal and anal fins both have scaly sheaths at their bases. The pectoral fins are long, extending as far as the level of the anus and containing 18 fin rays. The caudal fin is emarginate. This species is greyish to pinkish-grey on the upper body becoming silvery pink to silvery-white on the lower body. The dorsal and caudal fins arepinkish to pinkish-yellow with darker margins, while the pelvic and anal fins are yellowish. These colours may either quickly fade or get deeper. The pinjalo attains a maximum total length of 80 cm (31 in), although of 30 cm (12 in) is more typical.

== Distribution and habitat ==
Pinjalo pinjalo has a wide Indo-Pacific distribution. It is found from the Red Sea south to Mozambique, Socotra, the Comoros and the Seychelles. It is also found in the Gulf of Aden, the Persian Gulf east into the Pacific Ocean where it occurs as far east as Papua New Guinea, north to Taiwan and the Philippines. In Australia larvae have been recorded at Port Hedland in Western Australia. This species occurs at depths of 15 to 100 m (49 to 328 ft) where it can be found on coral and rocky reefs, both coastal and offshore, as well as outer reef slopes.

== Biology ==
Pinjalo pinjalo is a schooling species which feeds largely on benthic and planktonic invertebrates. its biology is otherwise little known.

== Fisheries ==
Pinjalo pinjalo is taken a by artisanal fisheries in many parts of its range, particularly in Asia. It is fished for using gill nets, handlines, traps and bottom trawls. It is sold as fresh fish or preserved as salted fish.
