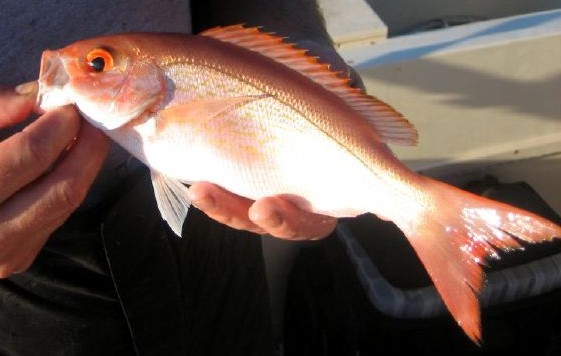

Conservation status
- Vulnerable (IUCN 3.1)

Scientific classification
- Kingdom: Animalia
- Phylum: Chordata
- Class: Actinopterygii
- Order: Acanthuriformes
- Family: Lutjanidae
- Subfamily: Lutjaninae
- Genus: Rhomboplites; T. N. Gill, 1862
- Species: R. aurorubens

Binomial name
- Rhomboplites aurorubens (G. Cuvier, 1829)

Synonyms
- Centropristis aurorubens G. Cuvier, 1829; Mesoprion elegans Poey, 1860; Aprion ariommus D. S. Jordan & C. H. Gilbert, 1883

= Vermilion snapper =

Species of fish

The vermilion snapper (Rhomboplites aurorubens), the clubhead snapper, night snapper or beeliner is a species of marine ray-finned fish, a snapper belonging to the family Lutjanidae. It is native to the western Atlantic Ocean.

== Taxonomy ==
The vermilion snapper was first formally described in 1829 as Centropristis aurorubens by the French zoologist Georges Cuvier with the type locality given as Brazil, Martinique and Santo Domingo. It is now classified as the only species in the monotypic genus Rhomboplites which was created by Theodore Nicholas Gill in 1862, which is within the subfamily Lutjaninae.

The generic name Rhomboplites is a compound of rhombo meaning rhombus-shaped and hoplites meaning "armed" a reference to rhombic shape of the patch of vomerine teeth. The specific name is also a compound, aureus meaning "golden" and rubens meaning "reddish", a reference to the golden-red colour these specimens develop when preserved in alcohol.

== Description ==
The vermilion snapper has an elongated, oblong body, With a short snout, a slightly protruding lower jaw and a small mouth. There are two pairs of nostrils on the snout, front and rear, which are simple holes. The upper jaw slides under neath the cheekbones when the mouth is shut. There are no enlarged canines in the jaws and the vomerine teeth are arranged in a triangular or rhombus shaped patch with a wide rearwards extension and there is a patch of granular teeth on the tongue. The dorsal fin has 12–13 spines and 10–11 soft rays while the anal fin contains 3 spines and 8 soft rays, and the anal fin is rounded. The pectoral fins contain 17–19 fin rays and are comparatively short, not extending as far as the level of the anus. The caudal fin is forked, but not extremely so. This species attains a maximum total length of 60 cm (24 in), although of 35 cm (14 in) is more typical, and the maximum published weight is 3.2 kg (7.1 lb). The overall colour is bright red fading to pink on the lower flanks and then to whitish on the abdomen. There is a series of short wavy oblique blue lines on the sides flanks above the lateral line which are created by spots on the scales, there may be yellow streaks below the lateral line. The anal fin is pinkish red; the caudal fin is red with a black margin, the dorsal fin is red with a yellow margin and the pectoral fins are red.

== Distribution and habitat ==
The vermilion snapper is found in the Western Atlantic Ocean. It ranges from North Carolina and Bermuda south along the eastern coast of the United States to the Bahamas. Then through the Gulf of Mexico and Caribbean Sea southwards along the eastern coast of South America as far as Santa Catarina, Brazil. It is found at depths between 20 and 300 m (66 and 984 ft). The adults occur at moderate depths, most frequently where there are rock, gravel or sand substrates close to the edge of the continental and island shelves, juveniles are found in shallower waters.

== Biology ==
The vermilion snapper frequently aggregates in large schools, often with red snapper species Lutjanus campechanus and Lutjanus purpureus, especially the younger individuals. It is a predatory species which forages for benthic and pelagic fishes, shrimps, crabs, polychaetes, cephalopods and other invertebrates. In the Gulf of Mexico the spawning season of the vermilion snapper runs from mid-April until mid-September, this is also the case off the eastern coast of the United States. Off Trinidad and Tobago, spawning takes place all year, peaking from around June until November. Over the Abrolhos Bank off Brazil spawning takes place in February and March. Vermilion snapper are slow growing fish and have a longevity of more than 15 years. They reach sexual maturity when they are between 1 and 2 years old.

== Fisheries and conservation ==
The vermilion snapper is subjected to severe fishing pressure almost everywhere it is found, being a target species for commercial, artisanal and recreational fisheries. They are taken using hook and line, as well as trawling and traps. The flesh is considered good eating but the catch could be also used for fish meal. The vermilion snapper is often sold as red snapper.

The IUCN assess the vermilion snapper as Vulnerable because of overfishing that happens in many parts of its range, leading to an overall decline in the population of up to 30%. in United States waters three stocks are recognised, two for this species alone in the southern Atlantic coast and the Gulf of Mexico, and a "snapper complex" in the Caribbean. None of these stocks is regarded as subject to overfishing.
