= Mecopisthes =

Scientific classification
- Kingdom: Animalia
- Phylum: Arthropoda
- Subphylum: Chelicerata
- Class: Arachnida
- Order: Araneae
- Infraorder: Araneomorphae
- Family: Linyphiidae
- Genus: Mecopisthes; Simon, 1926

Type species
- M. silus (O. Pickard-Cambridge, 1873)

Species
- 18, see text

Genus of spiders

Mecopisthes is a genus of dwarf spiders that was first described by Eugène Louis Simon in 1926.

== Species ==
As of May 2019 it contains eighteen species:

- Mecopisthes alter Thaler, 1991 – Italy
- Mecopisthes crassirostris (Simon, 1884) – Portugal, France
- Mecopisthes daiarum Bosmans, 1993 – Algeria
- Mecopisthes jacquelinae Bosmans, 1993 – Morocco
- Mecopisthes latinus Millidge, 1978 – Switzerland, Italy
- Mecopisthes millidgei Wunderlich, 1995 – Italy (Sardinia)
- Mecopisthes monticola Bosmans, 1993 – Algeria
- Mecopisthes nasutus Wunderlich, 1995 – Greece (incl. Crete)
- Mecopisthes nicaeensis (Simon, 1884) – Spain, France, Italy
- Mecopisthes orientalis Tanasevitch & Fet, 1986 – Turkmenistan
- Mecopisthes paludicola Bosmans, 1993 – Algeria
- Mecopisthes peuceticus Caporiacco, 1951 – Italy
- Mecopisthes peusi Wunderlich, 1972 – Europe, Israel
- Mecopisthes pictonicus Denis, 1950 – France
- Mecopisthes pumilio Wunderlich, 2008 – Switzerland
- Mecopisthes rhomboidalis Gao, Zhu & Gao, 1993 – China
- Mecopisthes silus (O. Pickard-Cambridge, 1873) (type) – Europe
- Mecopisthes tokumotoi Oi, 1964 – Japan
