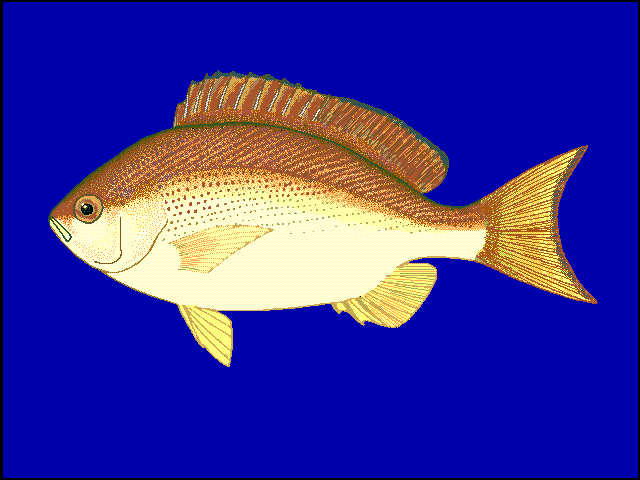
- Pinjalo pinjalo

Scientific classification
- Kingdom: Animalia
- Phylum: Chordata
- Class: Actinopterygii
- Order: Acanthuriformes
- Family: Lutjanidae
- Subfamily: Lutjaninae
- Genus: Pinjalo; Bleeker, 1873

Type species
- Caesio pinjalo Bleeker, 1850

= Pinjalo (genus) =

Genus of ray-finned fishes

Pinjalo is a genus of marine ray-finned fish, snappers belonging to the family Lutjanidae. They are native to the Indian Ocean and the western Pacific Ocean

== Taxonomy ==
Pinjalo was created as a monotypic genus by the Dutch physician, herpetologist and ichthyologist Pieter Bleeker, it was a monotypic genus containing only Bleeker's Caesio pinjalo, which he had Species description described in 1850. A second species, P. lewisi was added in 1987. The generic name Pinjalo is derived from a Malay word for a fish pinialo. The genus is classified within the subfamily Lutjaninae.

=== Species ===
The following two species are classified within the genus Pinjalo:

- Pinjalo lewisi J. E. Randall, G. R. Allen & W. D. Anderson, 1987 (slender pinjalo)
- Pinjalo pinjalo (Bleeker, 1850) (pinjalo)

== Characteristics ==
Pinjalo snappers are medium-sized snappers and have moderately deep bodies with a comparatively small heads and a pointed snout. The eyes are placed in the middle of each side of the head. They have small teeth in their jaws with no enlarged cacine like teeth. The vomerine teeth and the palatine teeth are tiny. The dorsal fin is continuous, with no notch in the vicinity of the junction of spiny and soft-rayed part of the fin. The dorsal fin has 11-12 spines and 13-14 soft rays while the anal fin has 3 spines and 9-10 soft rays. The pectoral fins are long, extending as far as the anus, containing 17-18 fin rays and the caudal fin is emarginate. The overall colour is pink or red on the upper body, whitish or silvery on the lower flanks and abdomen, with fins which may be reddish, pink, yellow, or whitish, frequently with thin dusky margins.

== Distribution and habitat ==
Pinjalo snappers are found in the tropical waters of the Indian Ocean and the Western Pacific Ocean. They can be found on reefs and rocky substrates as deep as around 60 m (200 ft).

== Biology ==
Pinjalo snappers are predatory fish, feeding on benthic and planktonic invertebrates, and may also feed small fishes. They may form large schools.

== Fisheries ==
Pinjalo snappers are important to artisanal fisheries in some parts of their range and are potentially exploitable more widely. They are mostly caught using handlines, traps and bottom trawls. The flesh is of considered to be of good quality and is usually sold fresh.
