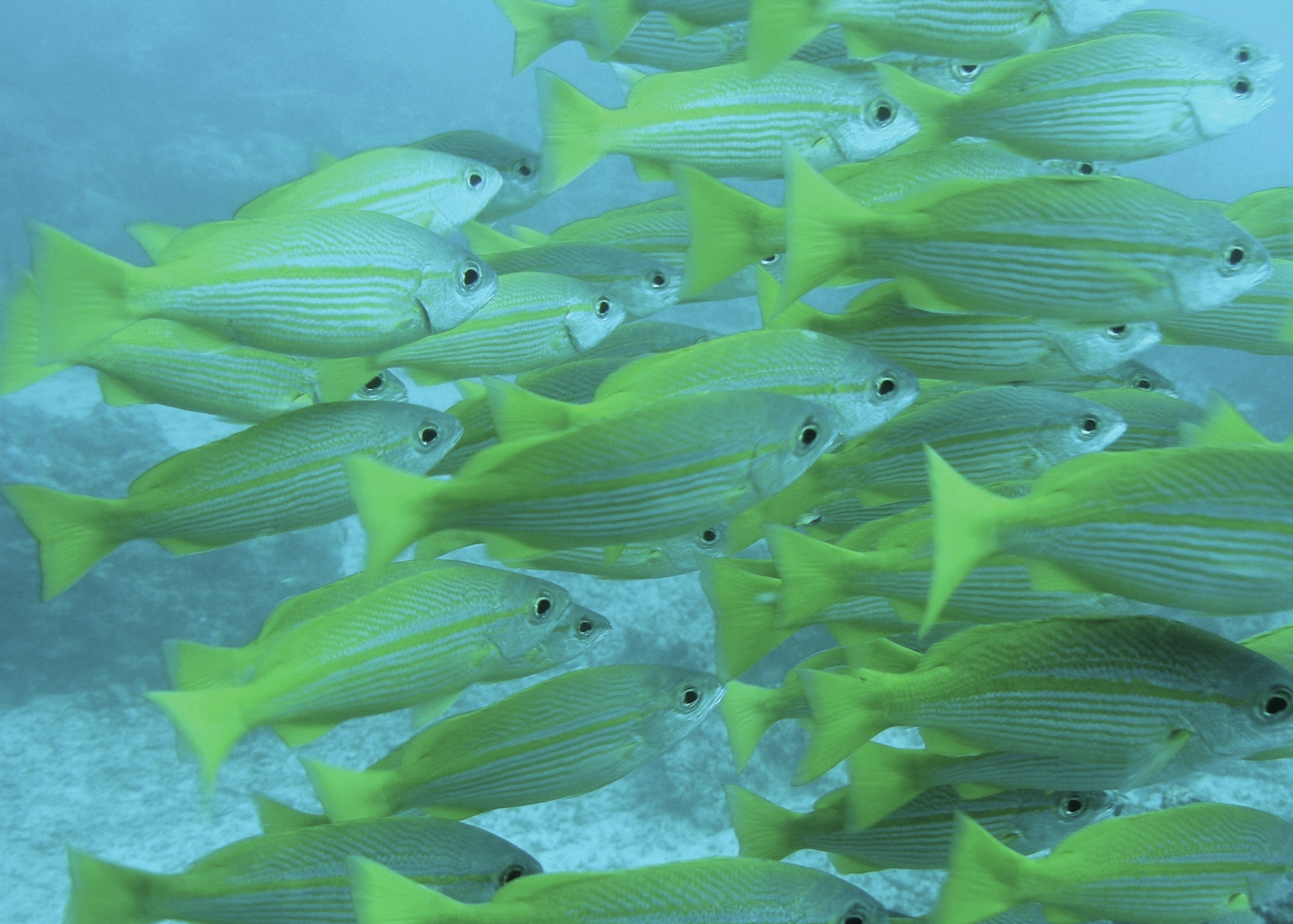
- Bigeye snapper (Lutjanus lutjanus)

Scientific classification
- Kingdom: Animalia
- Phylum: Chordata
- Class: Actinopterygii
- Division: Teleostei
- Order: Acanthuriformes
- Family: Lutjanidae
- Subfamily: Lutjaninae; Gill, 1861

Genera
- See text

Synonyms
- Caesionidae Bonaparte, 1831; Hoplopagrinae

= Lutjaninae =

Lutjaninae Temporal range: Early Eocene–present

Subfamily of fishes

Lutjaninae is a subfamily of marine ray-finned fishes, one of four subfamilies classified within the family Lutjanidae, the snappers. It contains the true snappers and the fusiliers, the latter of which were previously placed in the family Caesionidae.

== Taxonomy ==
In the past, the fusiliers (genera Caesio, Dipterygonotus, Gymnocaesio, and Pterocaesio), which are adapted for feeding on plankton, rather than on larger prey, and are found at reefs in the Indo-Pacific and in the Red Sea, were placed in their own family, Caesionidae. Caesionidae was named by the French zoologist Charles Lucien Bonaparte in 1831, named after the genus Caesio which was named in 1801 by Bernard Germain de Lacépède, the name derived from caesius meaning "blue", as the type species of Caesio is the blue and gold fusilier (Caesio caerulaurea). However, more recently, taxonomic studies have found this placement to be paraphyletic, with fusiliers being deeply nested within the family Lutjanidae, the snappers, being placed within the subfamily Lutjaninae.

== Genera ==
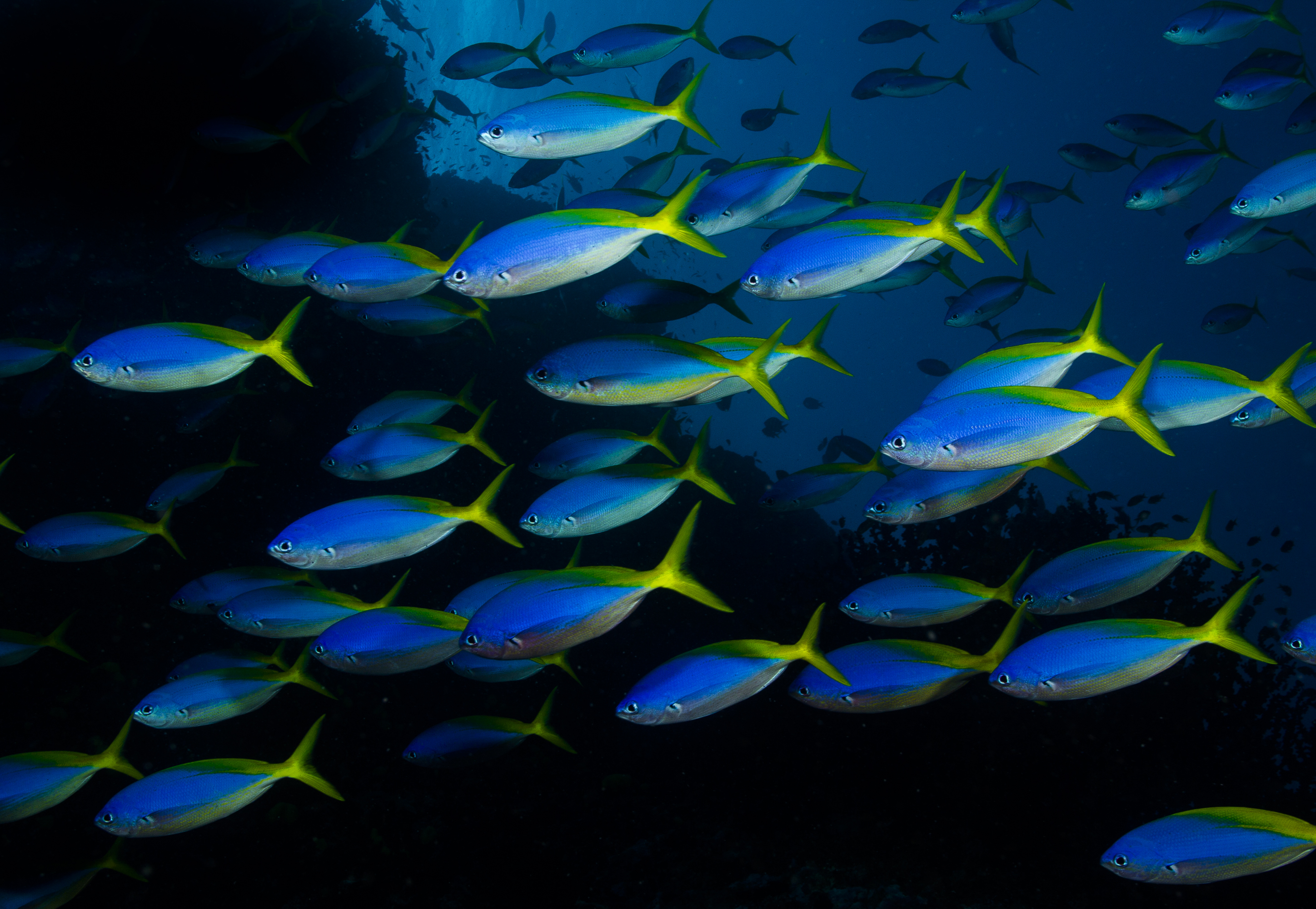
The blue-and-gold fusilier, Caesio teres

The subfamily Lutjaninae contains 10 genera:

- genus Caesio Lacépède, 1801
- genus Dipterygonotus Bleeker, 1849
- genus Gymnocaesio Bleeker, 1876
- genus Hoplopagrus Gill, 1861
- genus Lutjanus Bloch, 1790
- genus Macolor Bleeker, 1860
- genus Ocyurus Gill, 1862
- genus Pinjalo Bleeker, 1873
- genus Pterocaesio Bleeker, 1876
- genus Rhomboplites Gill, 1862

A taxonomic study of snappers within the subfamily Lutjaninae in the tropical western Atlantic Ocean indicated that the monotypic genera Ocyurus and Rhomboplites sit within the genus Lutjanus.

The following fossil genera are also known:

- genus †Hypsocephalus Swift & Ellwood, 1972 (Late Eocene of Florida, US)
- species †"Caesio" breviuscula Bannikov, 2000 (earliest Eocene of Turkmenistan)

== Distribution ==
This family has a global distribution, with Lutjanus snappers being found in both the Atlantic and the Indo-Pacific. Meanwhile, fusiliers are restricted to the Indo-Pacific region. Fusiliers are mainly fishes of coral reefs and occur from close to the surface down as far as 60 m (200 ft).

== Characteristics ==
Fusiliers have cylindrical and streamlined bodies, with an oblong or fusiform shape and which are laterally flattened. Their shape is similar to the closely related lutjanine snappers. A line drawn along the body from the snout to the centre of the tail would pass through the eye. They have small, protrusible mouths with small teeth in the jaws and there may or may not be teeth on the other parts of the mouth. They have a deeply forked caudal fin with angular tips to the lobes. The dorsal and anal fins are quite evenly sloped from the front to the back, except that in Dipterygonotus they are not evenly sloped and some dorsal spines are nearly separate. The dorsal fins have 10–15 thin spines and 8–22 soft rays while the anal fin contains 3 spines and 9–13 soft rays. The pelvic fins have a single spine and 5 soft rays while the pectoral fins contain 16–24 rays. They can attain a length of up to 60 cm (24 in), though most species only reach about half that length. In most species the dorsal and anal fins have scales. Fusiliers do my have stripes on the flanks, some species have black markings on their tails but in all species the axil of the pectoral fins is black.

== Biology ==
Fusiliers are schooling fish, often in mixed species aggregations with other fusiliers. The extensible upper jaws.are adapted for picking zooplankton. Fusiliers are diurnal, they spend the day feeding in large aggregations in middle of the water column over reefs, along steep outer reef slopes and around pinnacles in deep water in lagoons. They are active swimmers but often pause to feeds or to visit the stations of cleaner fish. They shelter in the reef during the night.

== Fisheries ==
Fusiliers are highly important species for coral reef fisheries, these fisheries use drive-in nets to catch fusiliers. Typically they are sold as fresh fish but they may also be fermented to make fish paste. They are also caught by tuna fishers for use as bait.

== Fossil history ==
The Lutjaninae are represented in the fossil record as far back as the 48.6 million years ago from the Eocene where specimens have been found in the United Kingdom and Louisiana. More recent specimens are known from the Miocene in Mexico and Florida and the Quaternary of the Turks and Caicos Islands.
