= Pinjalo lewisi =

Conservation status
- Least Concern (IUCN 3.1)

Scientific classification
- Kingdom: Animalia
- Phylum: Chordata
- Class: Actinopterygii
- Order: Acanthuriformes
- Family: Lutjanidae
- Genus: Pinjalo
- Species: P. lewisi

Binomial name
- Pinjalo lewisi J. E. Randall, G. R. Allen & W. D. Anderson, 1987

Species of fish

Pinjalo lewisi, the slender pinjalo or red pinjalo, is a species of marine ray-finned fish, a snapper belonging to the family Lutjanidae. It is found in the Indian and Western Pacific Oceans.

== Taxonomy ==
Pinjalo lewisi was first formally described in 1987 by John Ernest Randall, Gerald R. Allen & William D. Anderson Jr. with the type locality given as Dumaguete market on Negros in the Philippines. The specific name honours Anthony D. Lewis (b. 1948) then of the Fisheries Division of the Ministry of Primary Industries in Fiji, in recognition of the many "valuable" specimens and photographs he allowed the authors access to, Lewis also donated a paratype.

== Description ==
Pinjalo lewisi has a moderately deep body, the head has a steep dorsal profile and the space between the eyes is distinctly convex while the snout is short and sharp. The eye is large, its diameter being roughly the same as the length of the snout with an adipose eyelid. The small mouth reaches to the front of the eye. Each jaw has a row of small, conical teeth, which are enlarged at the front, and inside those isa band of bristle-like teeth. The dorsal fin has 12 spines and 13 soft rays while the anal fin contains 3 spines and 8-9 soft rays. These fins both have a fins scaly sheath at their base. The longpectoral fins extend to the level of the anus, and typically has 17 fin rays. The caudal fin is emarginate. The overall colour is reddish to reddish-orange and there is a pale spot on the dorsal part of the caudal peduncle. They are able to quickly deepen or lighten their colour. This species attains a maximum standard length of 50 cm (20 in).

== Distribution and habitat ==
Pinjalo lewisi Is found in the Indian Ocean at the Laccadive Islands, the Maldives, Sri Lanka and the Chagos Islands. They have also been recorded from the Andaman and Nicobar Islands east into the Pacific to Fiji, north to the Ryukyu Islands. It has been recorded as far south as Australia where it is found from the vicinity of the Ashmore Reef and Cartier Island in the Timor Sea, to the northeast of Nhulunbuy in the Northern Territory, and from the reefs off Innisfail to Hervey Bay, Queensland. The planktonic larvae have been recorded to the south of the main range. This species is found at depths between 20 and 200 m (66 and 656 ft) and it occurs over deep coral and rocky reefs.

== Biology ==
Pinjalo lewisi is frequently encountered in schools. This species feeds on both benthic and planktonic invertebrates, and may also feed on fishes. Spawning aggregations have been reported from Aceh, Sumatra.

== Fisheries ==
Pinjalo lewisi is caught using handlines, traps and bottom trawls, and, in Australian waters, on deep drop-lines. It is typically marketed as fresh fish,
