= Deep Seven =

Seven species of deep water fish

Deep Seven or Deep 7 refers to seven species of deep water fish of cultural, commercial, and recreational importance found in the Hawaiian Archipelago and Johnston Island. The Deep Seven are:

Local name	Hawaiian language Name	Common name	Scientific name
ehu	ʻulaʻula	squirrelfish snapper	Etelis carbunculus
gindai	ʻukikiki	flower or Brigham's snapper	Pristipomoides zonatus
hapuʻu	hapuʻu or hapuʻupu'u	Hawaiian grouper, black grouper, or sea bass	Epinephelus quernus
kalekale	kalekale	Von Siebold's snapper	Pristipomoides sieboldii
lehi	lehi	silverjaw or ironjaw snapper	Aphareus rutilans
onaga	ʻulaʻula koaʻe	scarlet, red, or longtail snapper	Etelis coruscans
ʻopakapaka	ʻopakapaka	pink snapper	Pristipomoides filamentosus

See List of fish of Hawaii.
