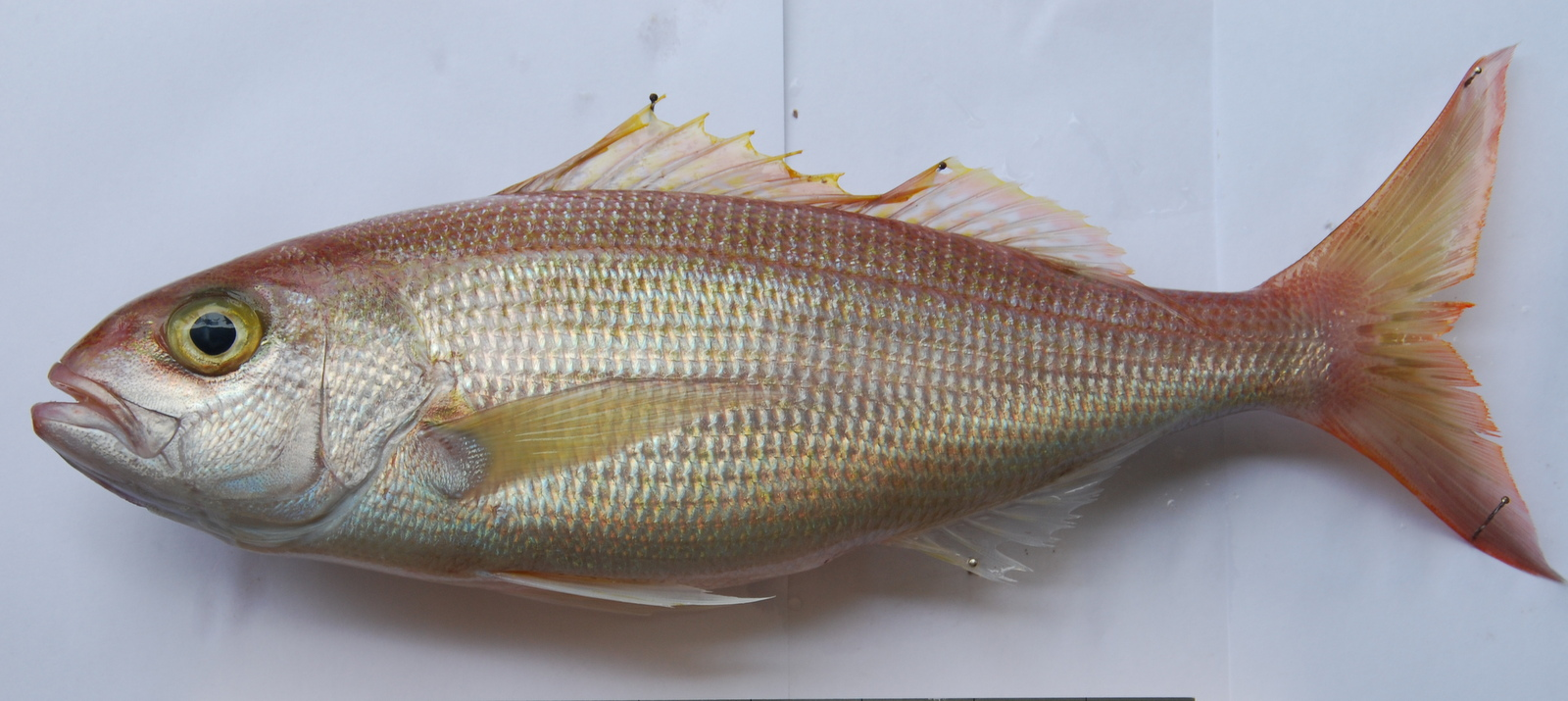

Conservation status
- Least Concern (IUCN 3.1)

Scientific classification
- Kingdom: Animalia
- Phylum: Chordata
- Class: Actinopterygii
- Order: Acanthuriformes
- Family: Lutjanidae
- Genus: Pristipomoides
- Species: P. filamentosus

Binomial name
- Pristipomoides filamentosus (Valenciennes, 1830)

Synonyms
- List: Serranus filamentosus Valenciennes, 1830; Chaetopterus microlepis Bleeker, 1869; Pristipomoides microlepis (Bleeker, 1869); Aprion brevirostris Vaillant, 1873; Etelis brevirostris Vaillant, 1873 (error in original description of A. brevirostris); Aphareus roseus Castelnau, 1879; Bowersia violescens D. S. Jordan & Evermann, 1903

= Pristipomoides filamentosus =

Crimson jobfish

Species of fish

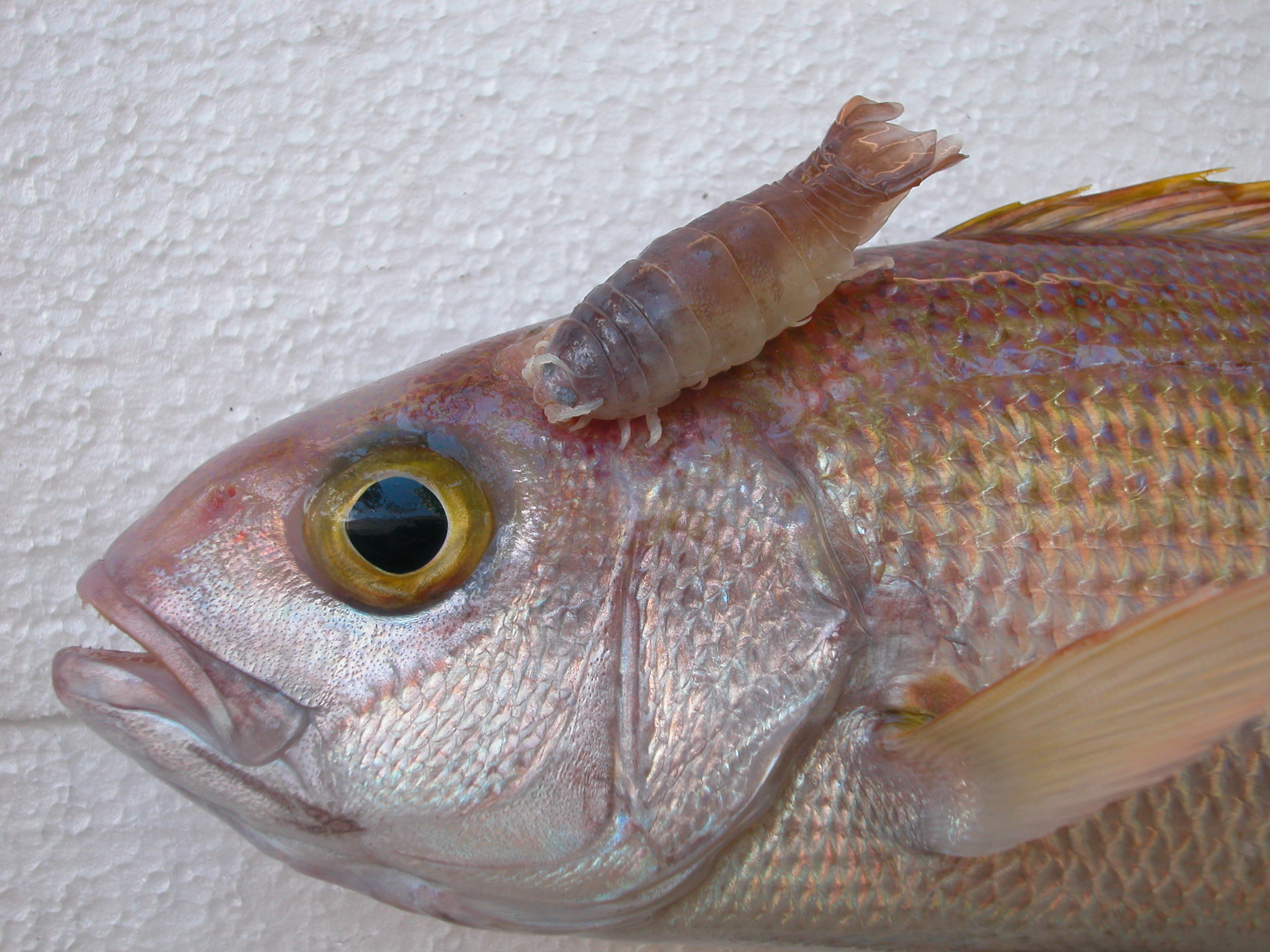
Crimson jobfish with attached isopod parasite

Pristipomoides filamentosus, also known as the crimson jobfish, rosy snapper, bluespot jobfish, crimson snapper, king emperor, king snapper or rosy jobfish, is a species of ray-finned fish, a snapper belonging to the family Lutjanidae. It is found in the Indian Ocean and in the Pacific Ocean as far east as Hawaii and Tahiti. This species is very important to local commercial fisheries and is sought out as a game fish--one of the Deep Seven species of Hawaiʻi.

== Taxonomy ==
Pristipomoides filamentosus was first formally described as Serranus filamentosus in 1830 by the French zoologist Achille Valenciennes with the type locality given as Saint-Denis on Réunion. The specific name filamentosus means "filamentous" and refers to the filament-like last soft rays in the dorsal and anal fins.

== Description ==
Pristipomoides filamentosus has an elongated, robust body with a depth of roughly a third of its standard length. The space between the eyes is flat, and has a slightly protruding lower jaw. In both upper and lower jaws, there is an outer row of conical and canine-like teeth, the front pair of canines is not highly enlarged, and an inner band of bristle-like teeth. The vomerine teeth are arranged in a triangular patch, and there are no teeth on the tongue. The dorsal fin has ten spines and 12 soft rays, while the anal fin contains three spines and eight soft rays. The bases of the dorsal and anal fins lack scales, and the last soft ray of each of these fins is extended into a short filament. The pectoral fin extend long as far as the anus and contain 15 or 16 rays. The caudal fin is forked. This species has an overall colour which may be brownish to pinkish, lavender or reddish-purple marked with slender yellow lines and blue spots on its snout and the flat space between its eyes. The dorsal and caudal fins are pale blue to lavender and have reddish-orange margins. This species attains a maximum total length of 100 cm (39 in), although 50 cm (20 in) is more typical, and a maximum published weight of 8.2 kg (18 lb).

== Distribution and habitat ==
Pristipomoides filamentosus has a wide Indo-Pacific distribution. It occurs along the eastern African coast from the Gulf of Suez and Gulf of Aqaba in the northern Red Sea to South Africa and across the Indian Ocean archipelagos and coasts into the Pacific, where its range extends east as far as Hawaii and Tahiti, north to Japan and south to Australia. In Australia it is found from Leeman, Western Australia, northwards into the Timor Sea off Darwin, Northern Territory, and east to the Great Barrier Reef off Queensland south at least as far as Seal Rocks, New South Wales, although larvae have been recorded as far south as Sydney. It also occurs at Lord Howe Island in the Tasman Sea. It is a benthopelagic species which is found at depths between 40 and 360 m (130 and 1,180 ft) over rocky substrates and rocky reefs.

== Biology ==
Pristipomoides filamentosus is a nocturnal feeder, migrating upwards through the water column to the part of its habitat closest to the surface to prey on small fishes, crustaceans, ascidians and salps. In the Seychelles spawning occurs between October and April, reaching its peak from February to April and again in November, while in Hawaii, it takes place between March and December, peaking from May to September. This is a slow growing long lived species with the oldest fish recorded at 44 years old.

=== Parasites ===
Known parasites of the crimson jobfish include the cymothoid isopod Anilocra gigantea, the pennellid copepod Lernaeolophus sultanus and the nematodes Cucullanus bourdini and Raphidascaris (Ichthyosaurus) eteligis.

== Fisheries ==
Pristipomoides filamentosus is an important species for fisheries and is caught using bottom longlines and deep handlines to be, largely, sold as fresh fish. The flesh is considered to be of good quality. It is of high commercial value in Hawaii and is the second most important quarry for the offshore handline fishery, making up 20% of the total catch of bottomfish.

According to the FAO, the fish have been overexploited in the Seychelles, but the stock is recovering. The commercial capture of crimson jobfish sharply dropped to 4,400 tonnes in 2009 from 25,300 tonnes the previous year.

In Hawaii, it is known as opakapaka and is reported to be the most desirable species of snapper for eating, with moist, white flesh. The peak fishing season in Hawaii runs from October to February.
