= Aphareus (disambiguation) =

Aphareus may refer to:

- Aphareus, name of multiple personages in Greek mythology
- Aphareus (writer) (4th century BCE), Ancient Greek orator and tragedian
- Aphareus (fish), a genus of fishes in the family Lutjanidae
