= Louis Vaillant =

French army doctor, naturalist and explorer

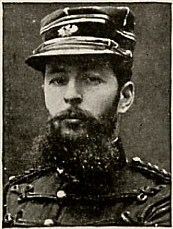
Louis Vaillant

Louis Vaillant (full name Louis Auguste André Marie Vaillant) (26 November 1876 – 1963) was a French army doctor, naturalist, and explorer. He was the second son of Léon Louis Vaillant, professor of zoology at the French National Museum of Natural History in Paris.

== Life ==
He upheld a medical thesis at Bordeaux in 1902 on damage to internal organs caused by snake venom.

Vaillant travelled with Paul Pelliot and the photographer Charles Nouette on Pelliot's archaeological expedition to Eastern ("Chinese") Turkestan, modern Xinjiang, in 1906–1908. He was the expedition's doctor and also naturalist, acting on behalf of the Musée National d'Histoire Naturelle; progress was reported in the Bulletin of the museum by his father. This Pelliot–Valliant expedition was a successor to that of Jules-Léon Dutreuil de Rhins and Fernand Grenard of the 1890s.

The expedition left St Petersburg on 17 June 1906 and proceeded via Bokhara, Kashgar, Ürümqi and Turfan, before reaching Peking in the summer of 1909.

In March 1908 the expedition visited Dunhuang, where numerous cave manuscripts were purchased and subsequently studied by Pelliot. The manuscripts are now kept at the National Library of France, the Bibliothèque nationale.

Vaillant served in two military campaigns in Tonkin. He was decorated for military service with the Légion d'honneur on 28 December 1922.

== Works ==
In 1910 Vaillant published an account of the expedition in Bulletins et Mémoires de la Société d'anthropologie de Paris. He later published on the ethnography of the Mong Cai region, now in Vietnam.

== See also ==
- Mocquard, M.F. (1910) Voyage de M. le D Louis Vaillant dans l'Asie centrale (Mission Pelliot) Reptiles et batrachiens Bull. Mus. Nat. Hist. Nat. Paris 3:145-153 (nb link does not retrieve - 25.10.2012)
