= Western Paradise Illustration =

642 AD Buddhist cave painting, Gansu, China

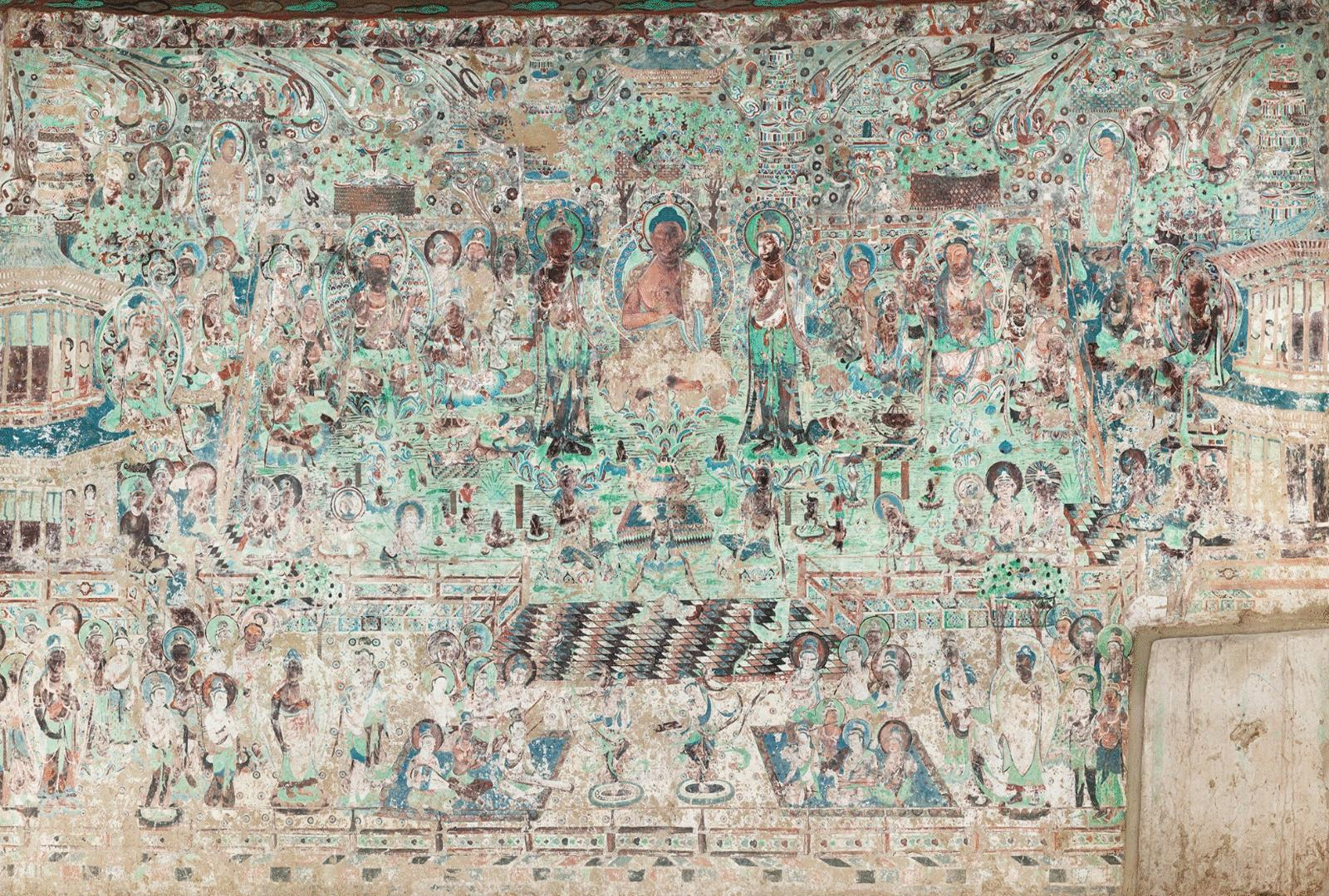
Western Paradise Illustration

The Western Paradise Illustration (Chinese: 西方净土变), also known as the Western Pure Land Illustration, is a Buddhist mural painting located on the south wall of Cave 220 of the Mogao Caves in Dunhuang, Gansu Province, China. The 5.3 m × 3.5 m (17 ft × 11 ft) artwork was painted in the early Tang Dynasty (642 AD) and funded by the "Zhai" family. Its style is similar to that of the ancient Chinese painter Wu Daozi. The Western Paradise Illustration features the earliest and the most spectacular scenes of the Pure Land among all mural paintings in the Mogao Caves.

== History ==
In 639 AD, the Tang Dynasty reached its peak, and the Silk Road was restored to prosperity during this period. Dunhuang, the site of the Western Paradise Illustration, became a transit station connecting China and the Western regions. At this time, a political rebellion occurred in Gaochang, a country on the Silk Road. In order to maintain the smooth flow and stability of the Silk Road, the Tang Dynasty assembled an army to put down the rebellion, and many craftsmen accompanied the army to Dunhuang.

According to records, the painter of the Western Paradise Illustration came to Dunhuang during this period. In 642, the Zhai family, a large local family in Dunhuang, began to build their family's private cave. The Zhai family is a famous family in Dunhuang that has practiced Buddhism for generations. The person who presided over the construction of Zhai Cave (Mogao Cave 220) was Daohong, a monk of the Zhai family in Dunhuang's Dayun Temple. Commissioned by Daohong, the painter was in charge of painting the murals on the south wall of Zhai Cave. According to the custom at that time, the name of the painter could not appear on the murals they made, but according to Zhai family documents, the painter's position was that of "Du Liao", i.e. the most skilled craftsmen.

== Content ==
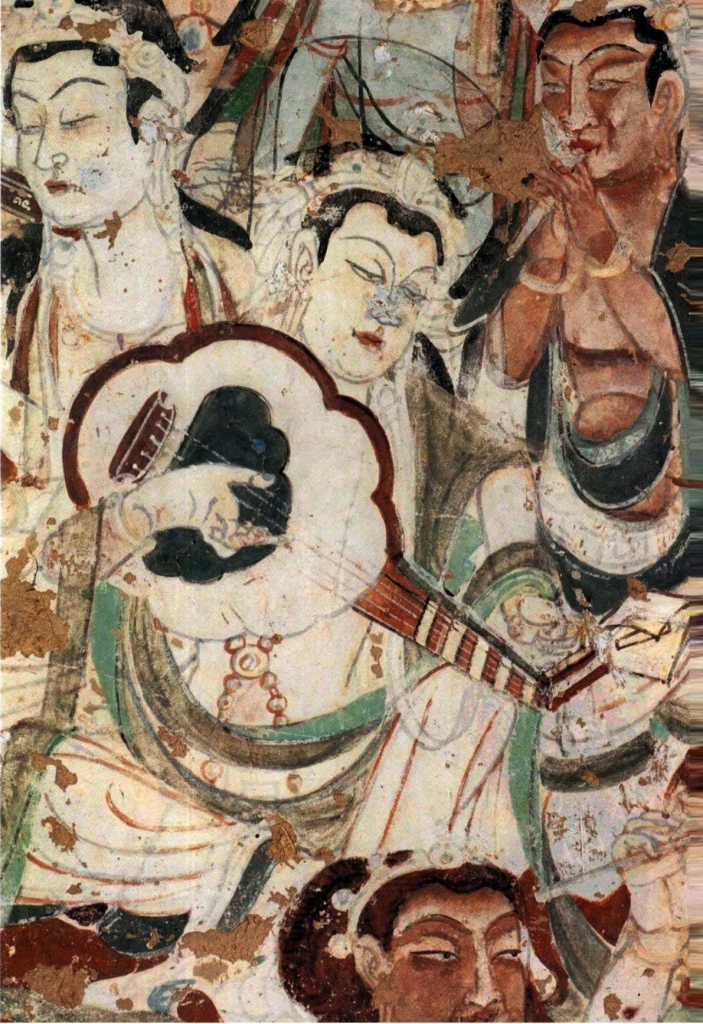
Bodhisattva playing the lute

The Western Paradise Illustration is composed of three parts: the lower section is the ground, the middle section is the water country, and the upper section is the sky.

In the sky above, there are several musical instruments with streamers, ten groups of "one Buddha and two Bodhisattvas" (a typical style in Buddhism) flying by the clouds, and four buildings ("Bao Zhuang", i.e. the building of treasure) between them.

In the middle of the mural is a large pool ("Bao Chi", i.e. the pool of treasure), and in the middle of the pool is Amitabha Buddha under the tree of treasure. The Buddha sat cross-legged with his hands folded and palms upturned. On each side of the Buddha, Bodhisattvas are standing on the lotus. The right Bodhisattva holds a vase in his left hand, and the left Bodhisattva holds a plant in his left hand. Behind each of these two Bodhisattvas, a Bodhisattva is sitting on a lotus. Beside these four core Bodhisattvas, several Bodhisattvas sit around. There are two pavilions on each side of the pool, and each corner of the pavilion is painted with a standing Buddha and many Bodhisattvas. Just below the pool is the stem of a lotus, branching left and right. Nine lotus flowers appear above the stem, five on the right and four on the left. There are animals and tributes on each lotus, representing the "nine courses to the afterlife" (i.e. bless the people in time to ascend to the western paradise).

The lower part is the ground, and the pool in the middle part meets the ground with a high platform composed of bricks carved with flowers. There are peacocks, Kalaviṅka (Chinese: 迦陵频伽), parrots and cranes on the stage. In front of the stage, there are two dancing dancers standing on a round carpet, and a group of dancers on the left and right.

== Cultural background ==
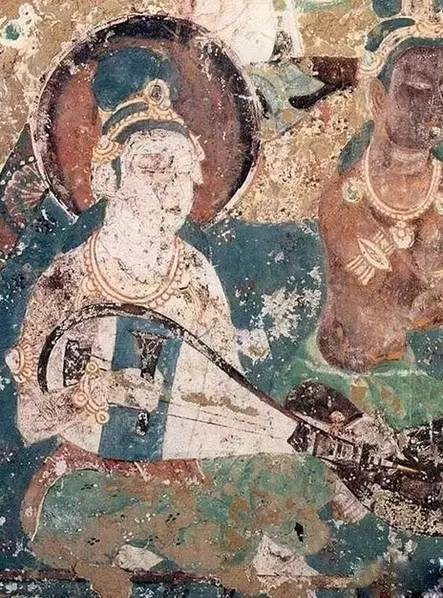
Bodisattva in the Western Paradise Illustration

The Western Paradise Illustration mural images are created according to the "Amitayurdhyana Sutra". The story of the sutra is that a king renounced his throne, became a monk, and took the title Fa Zang. He made forty-eight wishes to save human beings, and if these wishes are not fulfilled, he will never become a Buddha. In the end, the king became a Buddha in the Pure Land in the West, and the name of the Buddha is Amitabha.

According to Buddhist scriptures, the Pure Land in the West is free of diseases, disasters and disturbances. People long to ascend to the Western paradise (western pure land) after death. In the early Tang Dynasty, Pure Land Buddhism (a sub-religion of Buddhism) was popular in China. However, at that time, the literacy rate of people was generally low, and printing technology was not advanced, so the Sutra Illustration became popular. The Western Paradise Illustration is one of them. The inexhaustible food, singing and dancing goddess and auspicious animals in the painting satisfy people's fantasy of the western pure land.

Considering the nature of Mogao Cave 220 as a private cave of the Zhai family, the most practical function is to offer sacrifices to ancestors and pray for future generations. The Western Paradise Illustration became the object of worship. People could use the mural as an object and use the repentance method of Pure Land Buddhism to hold a sacrificial ceremony for their ancestors. At the same time, the living can also repent their sins through the sacrificial ceremony to prepare for their ascension to the western paradise after death.

== Modern research ==
=== Images of Cave 220 ===
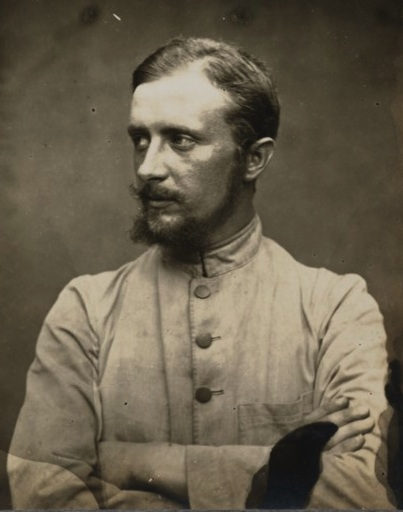
Paul Pelliot

On February 24, 1908, French photographer Charles Nouette, Paul Pelliot and two other French expedition teams first took images of Mogao Cave 220. However, according to the photos they took, the south wall of the main chamber of the cave is a mural composed of human portraits and several sutra paintings, rather than the Western Paradise Illustration today.

=== The Western Paradise Illustration mural ===
In the summer of 1944, several employees of the National Dunhuang Art Research Institute found that the murals of human portraits on the south wall of Cave 220 were gradually falling off, and the early murals with bright colors and neat lines were looming in the place where they fell off. When they stripped the mural, a mural of the early Tang Dynasty was discovered, that is, the Western Paradise Illustration. Surprisingly, although the faces and arms of most of the Dunhuang murals have been blackened by oxidation, the Western Paradise Illustration has maintained unusually bright colors, which provides research value for the mural.
