= Rhins =

Rhins may refer to:

- Rhins of Galloway, peninsula in Dumfries and Galloway, Scotland
- Jules Léon Dutreuil de Rhins (1846 –1894), French geographer and explorer

== See also ==
- Rinns
