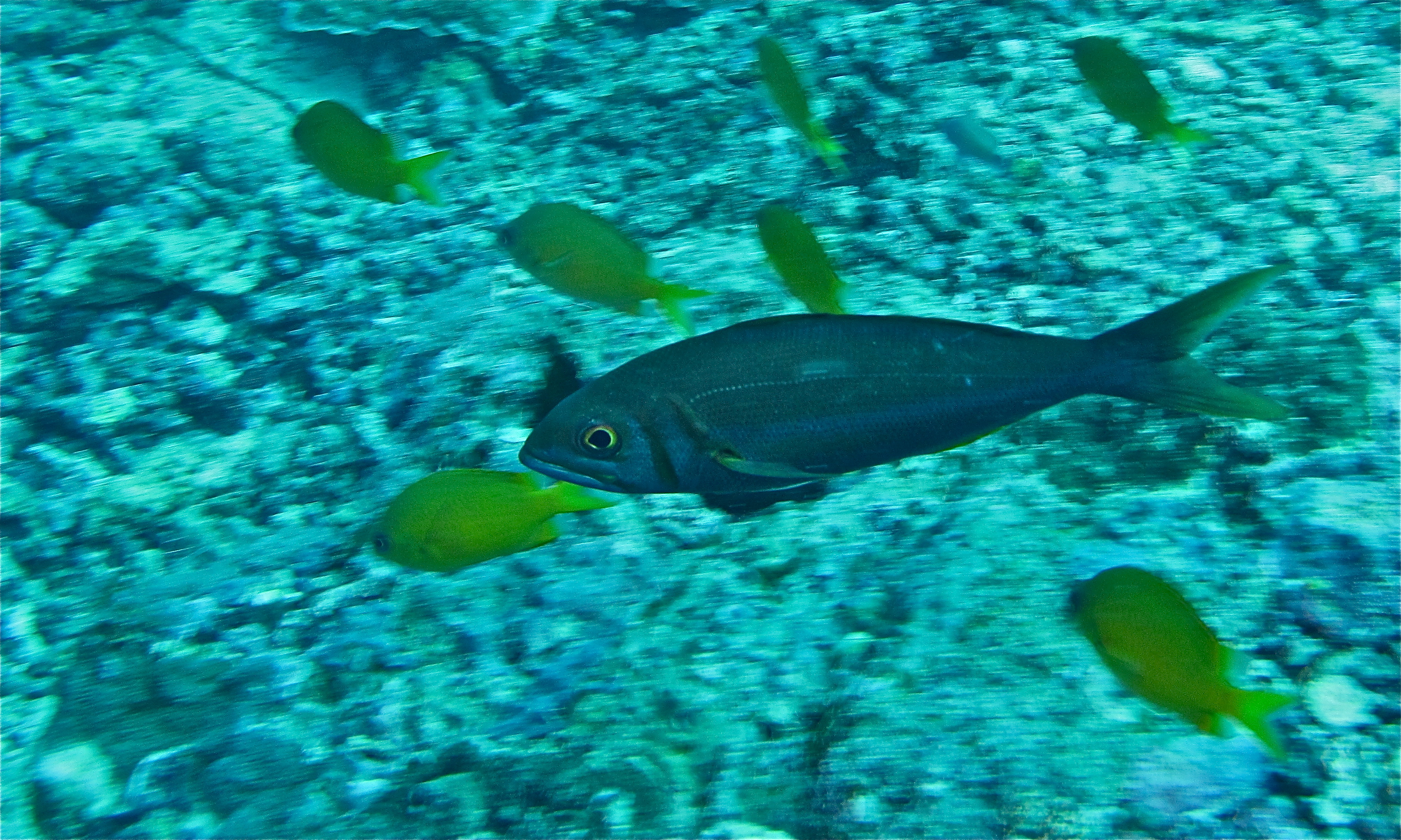

Conservation status
- Least Concern (IUCN 3.1)

Scientific classification
- Kingdom: Animalia
- Phylum: Chordata
- Class: Actinopterygii
- Division: Teleostei
- Order: Acanthuriformes
- Family: Lutjanidae
- Genus: Aphareus
- Species: A. furca

Binomial name
- Aphareus furca (Lacépède, 1801)

Synonyms
- Labrus furca Lacepède, 1801; Caranxomorus sacrestinus Lacepède, 1803; Aphareus caerulescens Cuvier, 1830; Aphareus flavivultus Jenkins, 1901

= Aphareus furca =

Species of fish

Aphareus furca, the small toothed jobfish, blue smalltooth jobfish, fork-tailed snapper or snapper jobbyfish is a species of marine ray-finned fish, a snapper belonging to the family Lutjanidae. It is found in the Indo-Pacific region.

== Taxonomy ==
Aphareus furca was first formally described in 1801 as Labrus furca with the type locality given as Mauritius. Under the synonym Aphareus caerulescens David Starr Jordan, John Otterbein Snyder and Shigeho Tanaka designated this species as the type species of the genus Aphareus in 1913, Georges Cuvier had created this genus in 1830 with A. caerulescens as its only member. The specific name furca means "fork", a reference to the deeply forked caudal fin.

== Description ==
Aphareus furca belongs to the tropical snapper and sea perches family, Lutjanidae. It can be reality identified by their adult coloration. This fish contains long filaments at the tips of its tail fin. Its body is of a bronze/blue-gray color and it has yellow fins. It reaches a maximum length of 70 cm but more commonly found to be a length of 25 cm. Males may be identified by yellow present on the head. The dorsal fin contains 10 spines and 10 or 11 soft rays, normally 11, while the anal fin has 3 spines and 8 soft rays and the pectoral fins have 15-16 rays.

== Distribution ==
Aphareus furca is found in the Indo-pacific from the south of Hawaii to the Pitcairn Islands, West and East Africa. It has also been found from the Gulf of Mannar to the southern part of Japan going southward to Australia. It has been collected at depths of 1–122 m but also has been reported at depths of 302m. In the late 1990s, this species of fish was found at 38.6% of the sampling sites and accounted for 2.5% of the recorded biomass. From the years of 2008 to 2014 estimates of its density were at 2.5 to 41.2 individuals per hectare in Pacific coral reef areas. It has also been discovered that its population size is affected by fishing and in areas where that fishing pressure was relieved, population size increased. The highest population sizes were recorded in the Line Islands and Phoenix Islands where those sizes were recorded to be 19.4 and 63 per hectare.

Small measurements of population size ranging from 0.3 to 17.2 were found in the Federated States of Micronesia, Solomon Islands, the remote islands around the Solomon Islands, Fiji, and Raja Ampat.

== Habitat ==
Aphareus furca is a benthopelagic and pelagic species that is mostly found to inhabit inshore coral and rocky reed areas, rocky bottoms, and clear water lagoons. This species is a piscivorous and can be found singly or in small groups. It is typically found at depths of 1–120 m, but it has been reported to be found at depths of 300 m.

== Threats ==
Aphareus furca is vulnerable to many detrimental effects that can decrease its population. Capture of Aphareus furca by spearfishing and handlines or vertical longlines makes it a commonly sought after gamefish. This fishing has been found to be a main factor leading to its reduction in population size, especially in Fiji and the Philippines where this species is found close to the coast. Hunting and fishing is posing as such a threat for population size that in South Africa bag limits have been implemented to how many can be caught.
