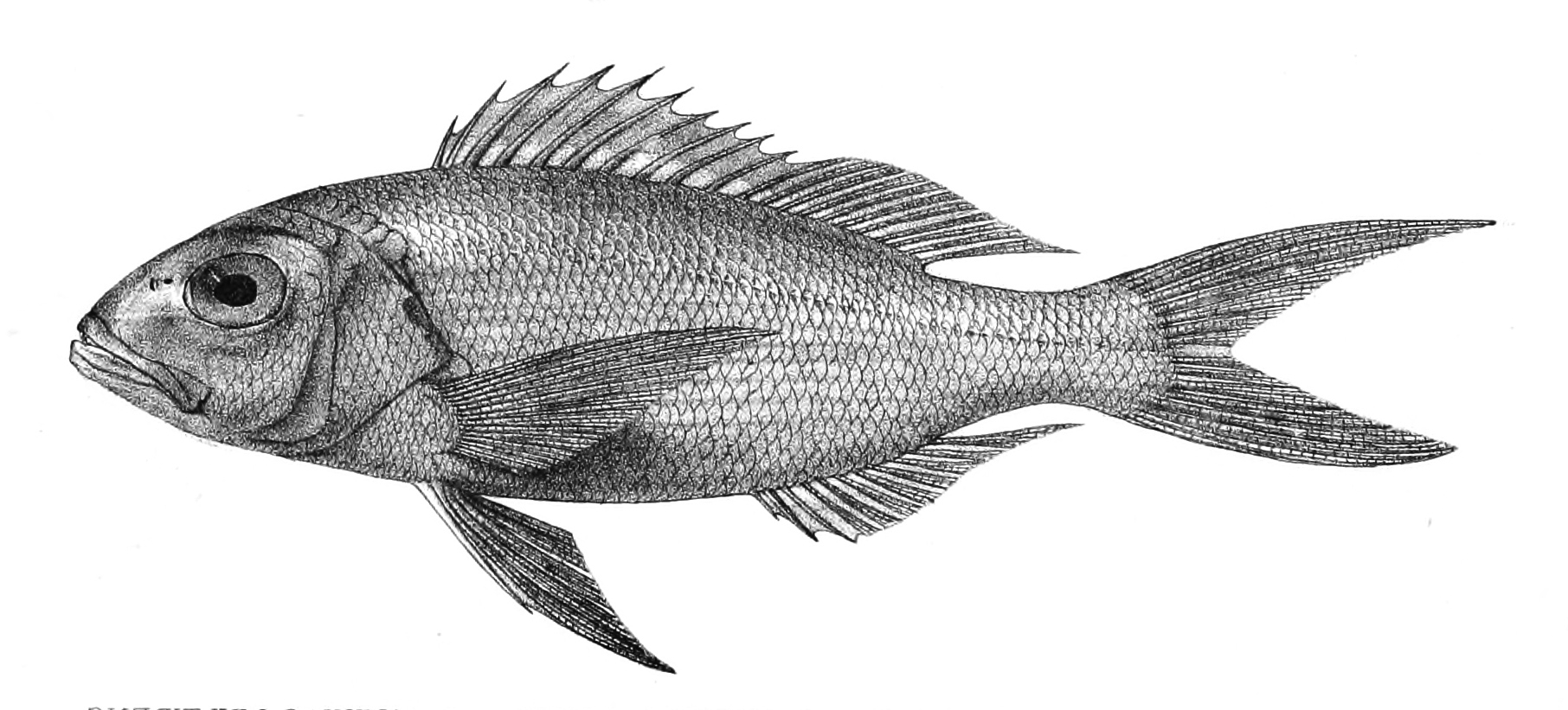

Conservation status
- Least Concern (IUCN 3.1)

Scientific classification
- Kingdom: Animalia
- Phylum: Chordata
- Class: Actinopterygii
- Order: Acanthuriformes
- Family: Lutjanidae
- Genus: Pristipomoides
- Species: P. multidens

Binomial name
- Pristipomoides multidens (Day, 1871)

Synonyms
- Mesoprion multidens Day, 1871; Diacope sparus Temminck & Schlegel, 1842; Pristipomoides sparus (Temminck & Schlegel, 1842)

= Pristipomoides multidens =

Species of fish

Pristipomoides multidens, the goldbanded jobfish or goldbanded snapper, is a species of ray-finned fish, a snapper belonging to the family Lutjanidae. It is found in the Indian and Pacific Oceans.

== Taxonomy ==
Pristipomoides multidens was first formally described in 1871 as Mesoprion multidens by the English zoologist Francis Day with its type locality given as the Andaman Islands. The specific name is a compound of multi meaning "many" and dens meaning "teeth", this is referring to the six canine teeth in the lower jaw and the two larger ones in the upper jaw. The older name Diacope sparus was coined by Temminck and Schlegel in 1842 and has been considered a synonym of P. multidens but it is not certain which taxon is represented by the specimen purported to be the type specimen of D. sparus.

== Description ==
Pristipomoides multidens has an elongated, robust body which has a depth of roughly a third of its standard length. The space between the eyes is flat and it has a slightly protruding lower jaw. In both upper and lower jaws there is an outer row of conical and canine-like teeth, the front 2–3 pairs of canines are enlarged, and an inner band of bristle-like teeth. The vomerine teeth are arranged in a triangular patch and there are no teeth on the tongue. The dorsal fin has 10 spines and 11 soft rays while the anal fin contains 3 spines and 8 soft rays. The bases of both the dorsal and anal fins lack scales and the last soft ray of each of these fins is extended into a short filament. The pectoral fins are long extending as far as the anus and contain 15 or 16 rays. The caudal fin is forked. The overall colour is yellowish to pale pink marked with 6 interrupted, golden stripes on the flanks, the side of the snout and the cheek have a pair of blue-edged golden stripes while the crownhas a series of yellow chevrons pointing towards the snout. The dorsal fin has yellowish stripes or lines of spots. This species attains a maximum total length of 90 cm (35 in), although 70 cm (28 in) is more typical.

== Distribution and habitat ==
Pristipomoides multidens has a wide Indo-Pacific distribution. It occurs along the eastern African coast in Tanzania, Mozambique and South Africa, in the Red Sea and across the Indian Ocean, excluding the Arabian Sea into the Pacific where its range extends east as far as Samoa, north to Japan and south to Australia. It is a deepwater demersal species which is found at depths between 40 and 245 m (131 and 804 ft) over hard, rocky and bumpy substrates.

== Biology ==
Pristipomoides multidens a sociable species which forms schools where the sea bed is hard, rocky and uneven in the vicinity of steep drop-offs. Like other snappers this species is predatory and it feeds on fishes, crustaceans, squids, gastropods and urochordates. Some studies have suggested suggest that this species is a serial spawner, while others have suggested that it is a multiple spawner. When these fish spawn, the eggs are scattered in open water. Each female lays between 296,000 and 2,800,000 eggs per annum. It is thought that the pelagic larval stage lasts for 40 days, as in the majority of the Lutjanidae.

== Fisheries ==
Pristipomoides multidens is a commercially important target for both artisanal and commercial fisheries throughout much of its range, but especially in Australia and Indonesia. This flesh is considered excellent eating and is frequently found in fish markets albeit normally in small amounts. The principal method used to catch this species is handlining.
