= Pristipomoides flavipinnis =

Conservation status
- Least Concern (IUCN 3.1)

Scientific classification
- Kingdom: Animalia
- Phylum: Chordata
- Class: Actinopterygii
- Order: Acanthuriformes
- Family: Lutjanidae
- Genus: Pristipomoides
- Species: P. flavipinnis

Binomial name
- Pristipomoides flavipinnis S. Shinohara, 1963

Species of fish

Pristipomoides flavipinnis, the golden eye jobfish or golden eye snapper, is a species of ray-finned fish, a snapper belonging to the family Lutjanidae. It is found in the Pacific Ocean.

== Taxonomy ==
Pristipomoides flavipinnis was first formally described in 1963 by the Japanese zoologist Shiro Shinohara with the type locality given as Naha Fish Market on Okinawa in the Ryukyu Islands of southern Japan. The specific name flavipinnis means "yellow fins", a reference to the yellowish colour of the dorsal fin and the anal fin.

== Description ==
Pristipomoides flavipinnishas an elongated, robust body which has a depth of around a third of its standard length. The space between the eyes is flat and it has a lower jaw which protrudes. In both upper and lower jaws there is an outer row of conical and canine-like teeth and an inner row of bristle-like teeth, the anterior canines on the lower jaw are enlarged. The vomerine teeth are arranged in a triangular patch and there are no teeth on the tongue. The dorsal fin has 10 spines and 12 soft rays while the anal fin contains 3 spines and 8 soft rays. The bases of both the dorsal and anal fins lack scales and the last soft ray of each of these fins is extended into a short filament. The pectoral fins are long extending as far as the anus and contain 16 rays. The caudal fin is forked. The back and upper flanks are pale pinkish, fading to silvery on the lower flanks and abdomen. There are dark spots on the top of the headIn life the dorsal fin has a yellowish margin. This species attains a maximum total length of 50 cm (20 in), although 35 cm (14 in) is more typical.

== Distribution and habitat ==
Pristipomoides flavipinnis occurs in the Pacific Ocean from western Thailand and southeastern Asia east to Tahiti, north to the Ryukyu Islands of Japan and south to Australia. It occurs at depths between 90 and 360 m (300 and 1,180 ft) over rocky substrates.

== Biology ==
Pristipomoides flavipinnis feeds mainly on benthic fishes supplementing this diet with crustaceans, squids and pelagic tunicates. They attain sexual maturity at 2.3 years old and are reproductive for a mean period of 8.5 years. They spawn throughout the year, spawning peaking between December and February.

== Fisheries ==
Pristipomoides flavipinnis is a target species for commercial fisheries and is mainly caught using bottom longlines and handlines. It is frequently seen in the fish markets in some parts of its range and is exported from Fiji. Its smaller size means that this species is more frequently used in deep frying.
