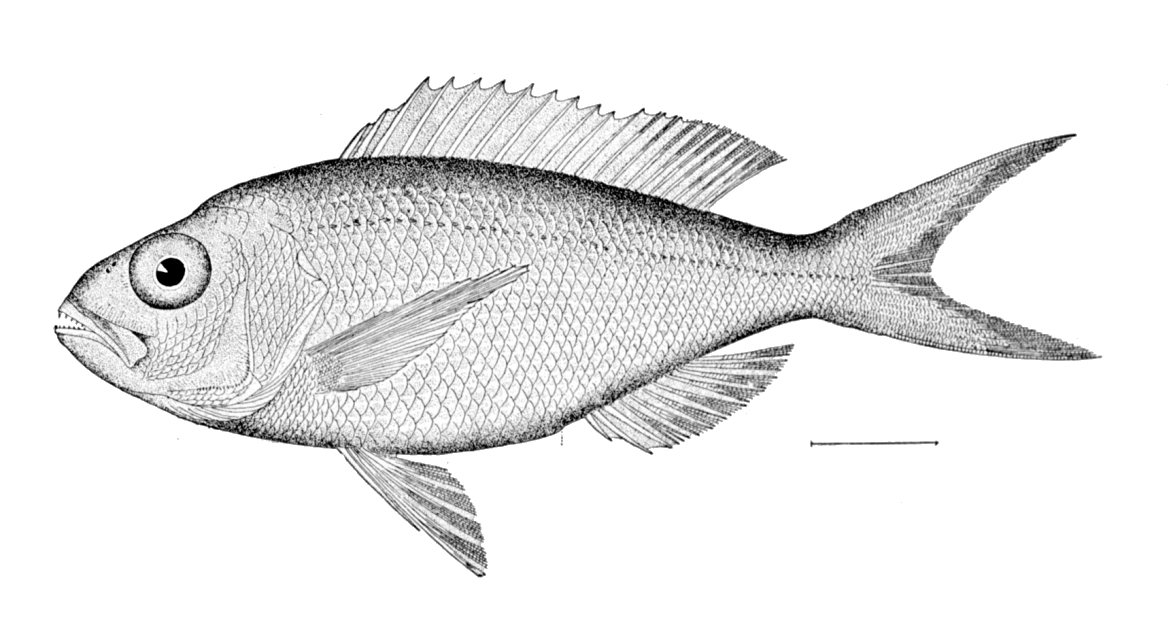

Conservation status
- Least Concern (IUCN 3.1)

Scientific classification
- Kingdom: Animalia
- Phylum: Chordata
- Class: Actinopterygii
- Order: Acanthuriformes
- Family: Lutjanidae
- Genus: Pristipomoides
- Species: P. macrophthalmus

Binomial name
- Pristipomoides macrophthalmus (J. P. Müller & Troschel, 1848)

Synonyms
- Centropristes macrophthalmus Müller & Troschel, 1848; Mesoprion vorax Poey, 1860

= Pristipomoides macrophthalmus =

Species of fish

Pristipomoides macrophthalmus, the cardinal snapper or bigeye snapper, is a species of ray-finned fish, a snapper belonging to the family Lutjanidae. It is found in the western Atlantic Ocean.

== Taxonomy ==
Pristipomoides macrophthalmus was first formally described in 1848 as Centropristis macrophthalmus by the German zoologists Johannes Peter Müller and Franz Herman Troschel with the type locality given as Barbados. The specific name macrophthalmus means "large eyed" and refers to the eyes being larger than the intraorbital area. In 1862 Theodore N. Gill used Poey's Mesoprion vorax, a junior synonym of C. macrophthalmus, as the type species of the genus Platyinius, which is now regarded as a subgenus of Pristipomoides.

== Description ==
Pristipomoides macrophthalmus has a moderately deep oblong body, its depth being typically over a third of its standard length, which is fusiform. It has a large mouth which has a slightly protruding upper jaw. The eyes are large, the space between the eyes is flattened and the snout is short and blunt. The dorsal fin has 10 spines and 11 soft rays while the anal fin contains 3 spines and 8 soft rays. The last soft ray of each of these fins is extended into a short filament. The pectoral fins are long, extending as far as the anus and contain 15 or 16 rays, and the caudal fin is forked. the back and upper flanks are pink in colour with a silvery hue, shading to silvery on the lower flanks and abdomen; the fins vary from translucent to pink. This species attains a maximum total length of 50 cm (20 in), although 30 cm (12 in) is more typical.

== Distribution and habitat ==
Pristipomoides macrophthalmus occurs in the western Atlantic Ocean where it is found from Bermuda and southeastern Florida and Louisiana south through the Gulf of Mexico to Campeche and Cuba. It is also found in the Caribbean Sea from Cuba to St Lucia and along the coast of Centra and South America from Nicaragua to La Guajira, Colombia. They are benthopelagic and are found at depths from 110 to 550 m (360 to 1,800 ft) over soft and semi-hard substrates.

== Biology ==
Pristipomoides macrophthalmus has a poorly known biology. Like other snappers it is a predatory species which feeds on smaller fishes and larger zooplankton. Off Puerto Rico it breeds throughout the year, peaking in March and December. Sexual maturity is attained off Florida at a fork length of 18 cm (7.1 in).

== Fisheries ==
Pristipomoides macrophthalmus is not regarded as a primary target species within its range, it is caught as bycatch or is targeted when the stocks of other snappers are depleted. In Puerto Rico it became a target species when stocks of Lutjanus vivanus underwent a significant decrease. it is caught using handlines and bottom trawls and the catch is normally sold fresh.
