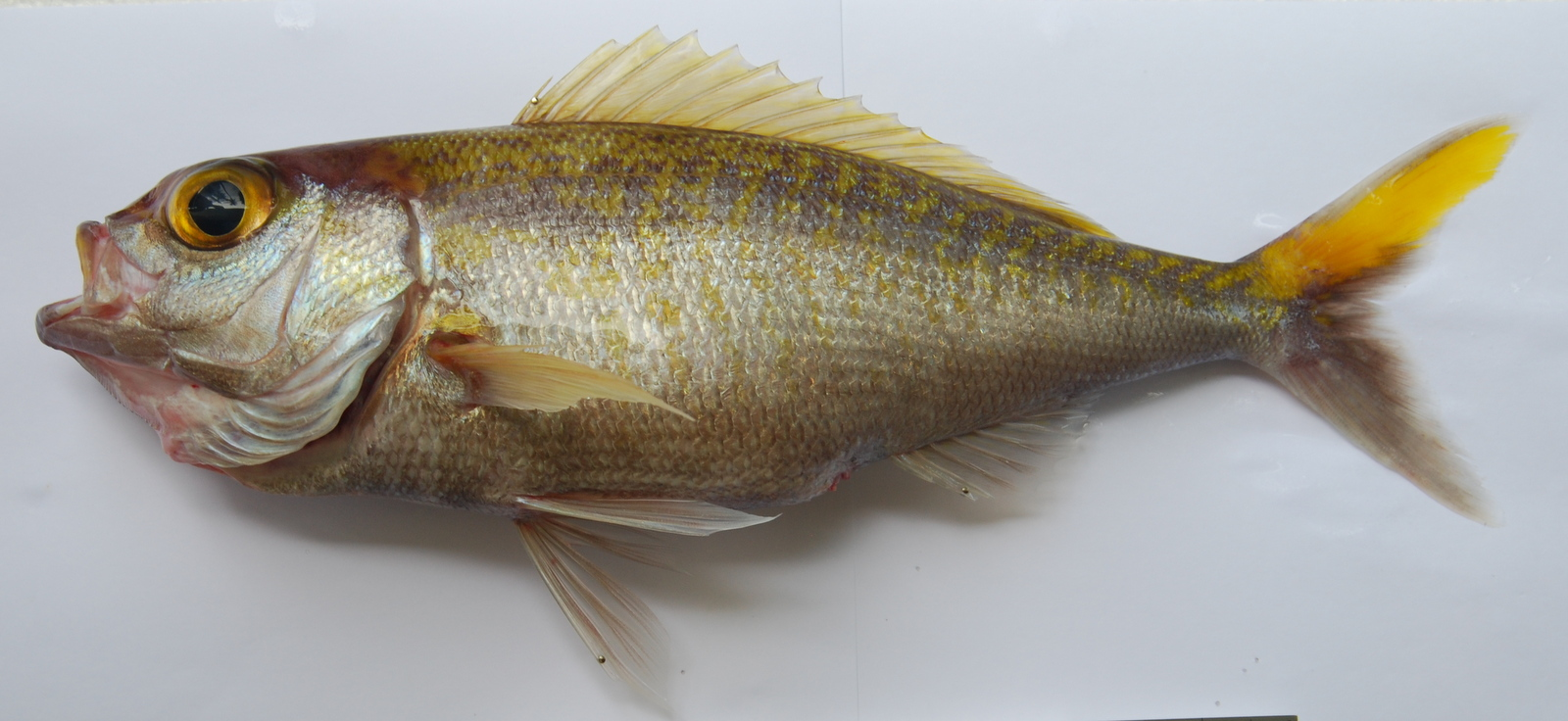

Conservation status
- Least Concern (IUCN 3.1)

Scientific classification
- Kingdom: Animalia
- Phylum: Chordata
- Class: Actinopterygii
- Order: Acanthuriformes
- Family: Lutjanidae
- Genus: Pristipomoides
- Species: P. auricilla

Binomial name
- Pristipomoides auricilla (Jordan, Evermann & Tanaka, 1927)

Synonyms
- Arnillo auricilla Jordan, Evermann & Tanaka, 1927

= Pristipomoides auricilla =

Species of fish

Pristipomoides auricilla, the goldflag jobfish or the yellow flower snapper, is a species of ray-finned fish, a snapper belonging to the family Lutjanidae. It is found in the Indo-Pacific region.

== Taxonomy ==
Pristipomoides auricilla Was first formally described in 1927 by David Starr Jordan, Barton Warren Evermann and Shigeho Tanaka with the type locality given as Honolulu. The specific name auricilla means "gold tail", a reference to the yellow upper caudal fin lobe.

== Description ==
Pristipomoides auricilla has an elongated but robust body. The space between the eyes is flattened, the jaws are roughly equal in length, although sometimes the lower protrudes slightly. There is an outer row of conical and canine teeth and an inner band of bristle-like teeth on each jaw. There is a triangular patch of vomerine teeth but there are no teeth on tongue. The caudal fin is forked. The dorsal fin contains 10 spines and 11 soft rays while the anal fin has 3 spines and 8 soft rays, the final ray on each of these fins is extended into a filament. The long pectoral fins extend as far as the anus. The overall colour of the body is purple to brownish purple marked with many yellow spots and in distinct yellow chevrons. The upper lobe of the caudal fin is yellow and the dorsal fin is yellowish. This fish attains a maximum total length of 45 cm (18 in), although 25 cm (9.8 in) is more typical.

== Distribution ==
Pristipomoides auricilla Has a wide Indo-Pacific distribution which extends from the Comoros Islands in the east to Hawaii, south to Australia and New Caledonia and north to Japan.

== Habitat and biology ==
Pristipomoides auricilla is found at depths between 80 and 360 m (260 and 1,180 ft), where they are found over rock reefs and rock substrates. They are predatory, feeding on other fishes, tunicates and salps.

== Fisheries ==
Pristipomoides auricilla is fished for using deep handlines. In some area, such as the Marianas, it is subjected to heavy fishing pressure. This species is sold fresh.
