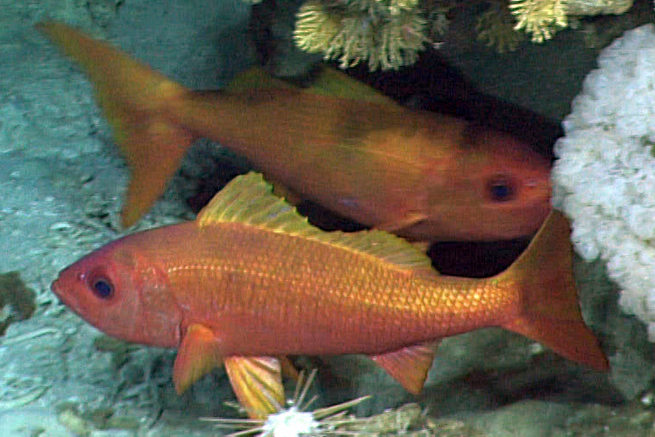

Conservation status
- Least Concern (IUCN 3.1)

Scientific classification
- Kingdom: Animalia
- Phylum: Chordata
- Class: Actinopterygii
- Order: Acanthuriformes
- Family: Lutjanidae
- Subfamily: Etelinae
- Genus: Randallichthys; W. D. Anderson, Kami & G. D. Johnson, 1977
- Species: R. filamentosus

Binomial name
- Randallichthys filamentosus (Fourmanoir, 1970)

Synonyms
- Etelis filamentosus Fourmanoir, 1970; Etelis nudimaxillaris Yoshino & Araga, 1975

= Randall's snapper =

Species of fish

Randall's snapper (Randallichthys filamentosus) is a species of ray-finned fish, a snapper belonging to the family Lutjanidae. It is native to the Indo-Pacific region.

== Taxonomy ==
Randall's snapper was first formally described in 1970 as Etelis filamenosus by the French ichthyologist Pierre Fourmanoir with the type locality given as New Caledonia. In 1977 William D. Anderson Jr, Harry T. Kami and G. David Johnson placed E. filamentosus into the monotypic genus Randallichthys. The specific name means "filamentous" which Fourmanoir gave it because the holotype had several caudal fin rays which extended into filaments, although this is not a feature seen in other specimens.

== Etymology ==
The name of the genus honours the American ichthyologist John Ernest Randall who worked at the Bishop Museum, Honolulu, and who made a significant contribution to the study of Indo-Pacific fishes.

== Description ==
Randall's snapper has a relatively elongate body with a short snout, blunt head and a flattened space between the eyes. The lower jaw is protruding. The vomerine teeth are arranged in a chevron and there are no teeth on the tongue. The dorsal fin has 10 spines and 12 soft rays while the anal fin has 3 spines and 9 soft rays, both these spine have no scales on their bases. The short pectoral fins do not extend as far as the anus and contains 16-17 rays. The caudal fin is lunate and in young individuals the rays of the lower lobe may be produced into filaments. The overall colour of this fish is rosy with a yellowish hue on the back. The dorsal fin is greyish yellow and the anal and caudal fins are rosy. All of these fins, as well as the pelvic fins have dark to black margins. This species attains a maximum total length of 50 cm (20 in), although 40 cm (16 in) is more typical.

== Distribution and habitat ==
Randall's snapper is found in the eastern Indian Ocean and the western Pacific Ocean. This species has been recorded from New Caledonia, the type locality, the Hawaiian Islands, the Cook Islands, the Ryukyu Islands, Izu Islands, Ogasawara Islands, Chuuk, Majuro, the Society Islands and Tonga. It has also been found at scattered localities around Australia, off Esperance on the southern coast of Western Australia, Scott Reef off northwestern Western Australia and Lord Howe Island in the Tasman Sea. This is an uncommon species and will probably be proven to be more widespread. It occurs in comparatively deep water at depths between 150 and 380 m (490 and 1,250 ft) over rocky substrates.

== Fisheries ==
Randall's snapper is a species which is of commercial importance in places in which it occurs, albeit of lesser importance, and they are typically caught using hook and line. The flesh is considered to be of good quality and is sold fresh.
