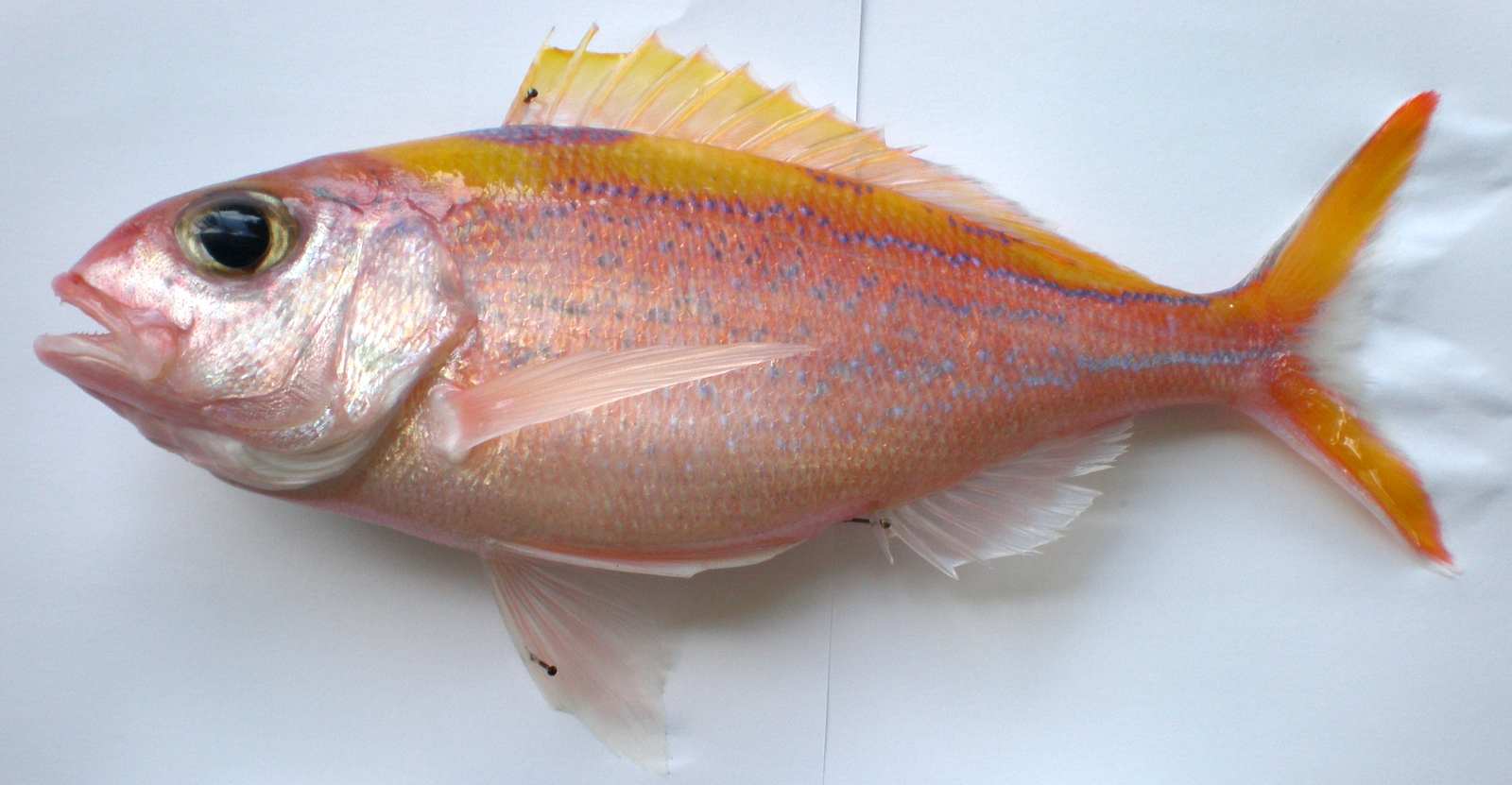
- Pristipomoides argyrogrammicus

Scientific classification
- Kingdom: Animalia
- Phylum: Chordata
- Class: Actinopterygii
- Order: Acanthuriformes
- Family: Lutjanidae
- Subfamily: Etelinae
- Genus: Pristipomoides; Bleeker, 1852

Type species
- Pristipomoides typus Bleeker, 1852

Synonyms
- Chaetopterus Schlegel, 1844 (preoccupied); Platyinius T. N. Gill, 1862; Tropidinius Poey, 1868; Bowersia D. S. Jordan & Evermann, 1903; Etelides D. S. Jordan & J. C. Thompson, 1905; Rooseveltia D. S. Jordan & Evermann, 1906; Ulaula D. S. Jordan & W. F. Thompson, 1911; Arnillo D. S. Jordan, Evermann & S. Tanaka (I), 1927

= Pristipomoides =

Genus of fishes

Pristipomoides is a genus of marine ray-finned fish belonging to the family Lutjanidae, the snappers. They are found in the Atlantic, Indian and Pacific oceans.

== Taxonomy ==
Pristipomoides was created by the Dutch ichthyologist, herpetologist and physician Pieter Bleeker in 1852 as a monotypic genus with Pristipomoides typus as its only species, this species therefore being the type species of the genus. The generic name is a compound of Pristipoma with the suffix oides which means "like". At the time Bleeker coined the name he though P. typus was more closely related to and in the same family as the genus Pristipoma, this taxon is now regarded as a synonym of the grunt genus Pomadasys in the family Haemulidae.

There are two subgenera which are recognised by some authorities and 11 currently recognised species in this genus are:

- Subgenus Pristipomoides Bleeker, 1852
  - Pristipomoides auricilla (D. S. Jordan, Evermann & [S. Tanaka, 1927) (goldflag jobfish)
  - Pristipomoides filamentosus (Valenciennesv, 1830) (crimson jobfish, crimson snapper)
  - Pristipomoides flavipinnis S. Shinohara, 1963 (golden eye jobfish)
  - Pristipomoides multidens (F. Day, 1871) (goldbanded jobfish, goldband snapper)
  - Pristipomoides sieboldii (Bleeker, 1855) (lavender jobfish)
  - Pristipomoides typus Bleeker, 1852 (sharptooth jobfish)
- Subgenus Platynius Gill, 1862
  - Pristipomoides amoenus Snyder, 1911
  - Pristipomoides aquilonaris (Goode & T. H. Bean, 1896) (wenchman)
  - Pristipomoides argyrogrammicus (Valenciennes, 1832) (ornate jobfish)
  - Pristipomoides freemani W. D. Anderson, 1966 (slender wenchman)
  - Pristipomoides macrophthalmus (J. P. Müller & Troschel, 1848) (Cardinal snapper)
  - Pristipomoides zonatus (Valenciennes, 1830) (oblique-banded snapper)

P. amoenus is treated as a synonym of P. argyrogrammicus by Fishbase but is regarded as a valid species by the Catalog of Fishes.

== Characteristics ==
Pristipomoides snappers are small to medium-sized and have fusiform, relatively slender and elongate bodies although they can also be robust. There is typically an outer row of enlarged, conical teeth and an inner band of bristle-like teeth with enlarged canines often placed on the front of the jaws. The vomerine teeth are arranged in a V-shaped or triangular patch, although one species Pristipomoides sieboldii shows a median extension to the rear of the main patch, this is also the only species which has teeth on its tongue. The space between the eyes is flattened. These snappers have a continuous dorsal fin which is not notched, this fin contains 10 spines and 10-11 soft rays while the anal fin has 3 spines and 7-8 soft rays. The dorsal and anal fins are lacking in scales and the last ray of each of these fins is extended and is noticeably longer than the neighbouring rays. The pectoral fins are long, equivalent in length to 2/3rds of the head length and contains 15-17 fin rays. The caudal fin is forked. The scales on the body are medium-sized to relatively small. The colour of these fishes is typically pink or rosy, occasionally they are purple, violet, or lavender on their back and upper flanks and frequently silver or whitish on lower flanks and abdomen.

== Distribution ==
Pristipomoides snappers are found in the warmer waters of the Indo-Pacific region and the western Atlantic Ocean.

== Habitat and biology ==
Pristipomoides snappers are found in relatively deep water, at depths between 20 and 550 m (66 and 1,804 ft), typically over rocky substrates. They may live as solitary fish or aggregate in small shoals. Like other snappers, they are predatory fishes which prey on other smaller fishes, squid, crustaceans and pelagic tunicates.

== Fisheries ==
Pristipomoides snappers are normally caught using bottom longlines and deep handlines but beam trawls may also be used. These fish are considered to have good quality flesh and they are largely sold fresh, although some of the catch may be preserved by freezing. They are important as food fish in some areas, especially in the western Pacific Ocean.
