= Etelinae =

- Etelis carbunculus

Scientific classification
- Kingdom: Animalia
- Phylum: Chordata
- Class: Actinopterygii
- Order: Acanthuriformes
- Family: Lutjanidae
- Subfamily: Etelinae; Gill, 1893

Subfamily of ray-finned fishes

Etelinae is a subfamily of marine ray-finned fishes, one of four subfamilies classified within the family Lutjanidae, the snappers.

== Genera ==
The subfamily Etelinae contains 5 genera and 24 species:

- Aphareus Cuvier, 1870
- Aprion Valenciennes, 1830
- Etelis Cuvier, 1828
- Pristipomoides Bleeker, 2020
- Randallichthys Anderson, Kami & Johnson, 1977
