= Pristipomoides typus =

Conservation status
- Least Concern (IUCN 3.1)

Scientific classification
- Kingdom: Animalia
- Phylum: Chordata
- Class: Actinopterygii
- Order: Acanthuriformes
- Family: Lutjanidae
- Genus: Pristipomoides
- Species: P. typus

Binomial name
- Pristipomoides typus Bleeker, 1852

Species of fish

Pristipomoides typus, also known as the sharptooth jobfish, white snapper, white jobfish, goldband snapper or threadfin snapper, is a species of ray-finned fish, a snapper belonging to the family Lutjanidae. It is found in the Indian and Pacific Oceans.

== Taxonomy ==
Pristipomoides typus was first formally described in 1852 as by the Dutch ichthyologist, herpetologist and physician Pieter Bleeker in with its type locality given as Sibogha on Sumatra. The specific name typus indicates that this species is the type species of its genus, Pristipomoides.

== Description ==
Pristipomoides typus has an elongated, robust body which has a depth of just under a third of its standard length. The space between the eyes is flat and it has jaws of near equal length. In both upper and lower jaws there is an outer row of conical and canine-like teeth and an inner row of bristle-like teeth. The vomerine teeth are arranged in a triangular patch and there are no teeth on the tongue. The dorsal fin has 10 spines and 11-12 soft rays while the anal fin contains 3 spines and 8 soft rays. The bases of both the dorsal and anal fins lack scales and the last soft ray of each of these fins is extended into a short filament. The pectoral fins are long extending as far as the anus and contain 16 rays. The caudal fin is forked. The overall colour is pinkish red with the crown marked with horizontal wavy lines and spots which are brownish yellow in colour and the dorsal fin has sinuous yellow lines. This species attains a maximum total length of 70 cm (28 in) and a maximum published weight of 2.2 kg (4.9 lb).

== Distribution and habitat ==
Pristipomoides typus is found in the eastern Indian Ocean and the western Pacific Ocean It occurs from the Andaman Sea east to Papua New Guinea, north to the Ryukyu Islands of southern Japan and south to Australia. It is a demersal species which is found at depths between 40 and 180 m (130 and 590 ft) over hard, rocky and bumpy substrates.

== Biology ==
Pristipomoides typus is a sociable species which forms schools. Its diet is mainly made up of benthic invertebrates and fishes. It is a serial spawner and a female can lay 760,000 to 2,100,000 eggs, sexual maturity is reached at 2.7 years old and the maximum age is 11.3 years.

== Fisheries ==
Pristipomoides typus is caught largely using handlines. It is considered to be a fish for eating and it is occasionally found in markets where it is normally sold fresh. In Southeast Asia, this is the main species to be used into fish head curry and claypot fish head.
