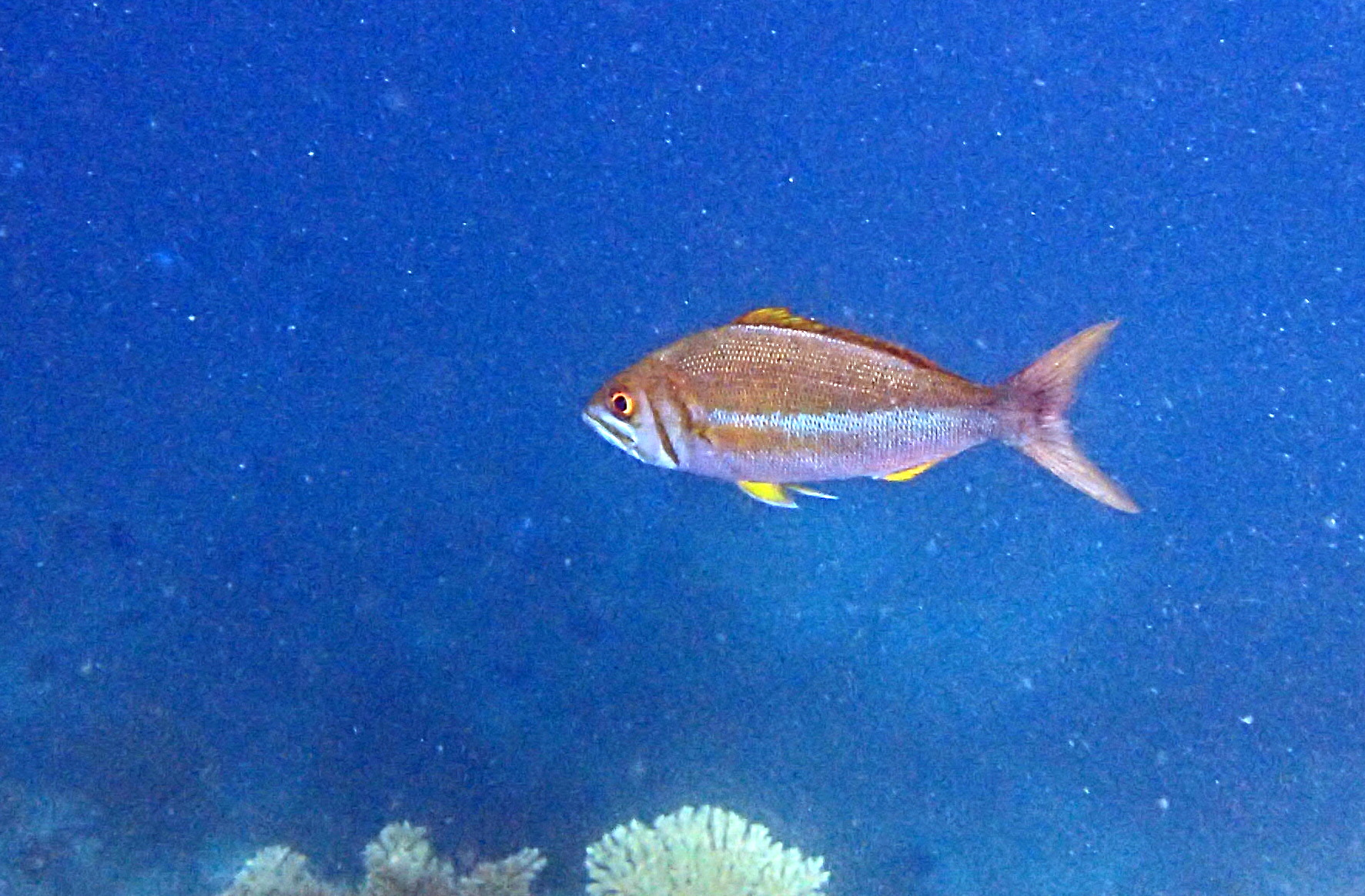
- (A. furca)

Scientific classification
- Kingdom: Animalia
- Phylum: Chordata
- Class: Actinopterygii
- Order: Acanthuriformes
- Family: Lutjanidae
- Subfamily: Etelinae
- Genus: Aphareus; G. Cuvier, 1830

Type species
- Aphareus caerulescens G. Cuvier, 1830

Species
- see text

Synonyms
- Platypodus Lacépède, 1804; Fares D. S. Jordan, Evermann & S. Tanaka (I), 1927; Sacrestinus D. S. Jordan, Evermann & S. Tanaka (I), 1927; Humefordia Whitley, 1931; Ulapiscis Whitley, 1933

= Aphareus (fish) =

Genus of fishes

Aphareus is a genus of marine ray-finned fish, snappers belonging to the family Lutjanidae. They are native to the Indian and Pacific Oceans from the African coast to the Hawaiian Islands.

== Taxonomy ==
The currently recognized species in this genus are:

- Aphareus furca (Lacépède, 1801) (small-toothed jobfish)
- Aphareus rutilans G. Cuvier, 1830 (rusty jobfish)

Aphareus is placed in the subfamily Etelinae. The genus was created by the French naturalist Georges Cuvier and he took the name Aphareus which he stated (in French) was from an “unintelligible and probably corrupt passage from Aristotle, where it seems to designate a fin specific to the female of the tuna”, the name is also similar to the name given to these fishes in the Arabic, farès, although this could be coincidental. In 1913 David Starr Jordan, John Otterbein Snyder and Shigeho Tanaka designated Aphareus caerulescens as the type species of the genus, this is a synonym of A. furca.

== Characteristics ==
Apahreus snappers are medium-sized Lutjanids which have elongated, fusiform but rather robus bodies. They have tiny teeth in their jaws with no canine-like teeth and they lack any vomerine teeth. They have gill openings which reach relatively far forward to the front of the eye. The area between the eyes is flat. The dorsal fin is continuous with no notch around te junction of the spiny and soft-rayed parts, it has 10 spines and 11 (infrequently 10) soft rays while the anal fin contains 3 spines and 8 soft rays. They have long pectoral fins which are a little shorter than head length and which contains 15 or 16 rays. The dorsal and anal fins do not have scales, the caudal fin is forked. The scales on these fish are comparatively small. Their colour can be purplish-brown, blue-grey, or reddish, they may display a silvery sheen on their lower flanks and abdomen.

== Distribution and habitat ==
Aphareus snappers have a wide Indo-Pacific distribution from eastern Africa to the Hawaiian islands. They prefer inshore waters where there are coral reefs and rocky bottoms at depths of around 6 m (20 ft) to, possibly, greater than 100 m (330 ft). They can be solitary or occur in small schools.

== Fisheries ==
Aphareus snappers are important foodfish, especially in islands. Fishermen catch them using handlines or bottom longlines. The flesh is considered to be of good quality and normally the catch is sold fresh.
