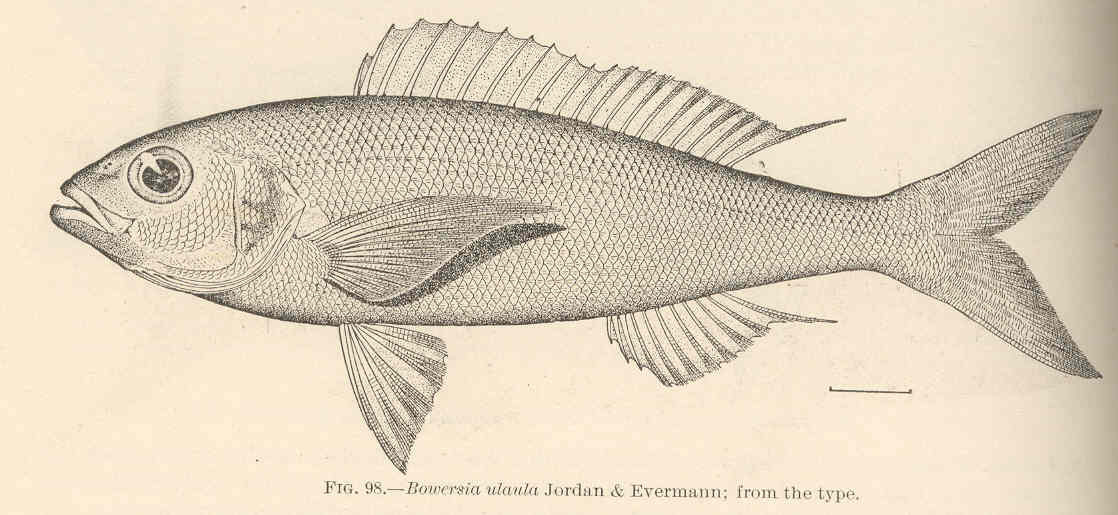

Conservation status
- Least Concern (IUCN 3.1)

Scientific classification
- Kingdom: Animalia
- Phylum: Chordata
- Class: Actinopterygii
- Order: Acanthuriformes
- Family: Lutjanidae
- Genus: Pristipomoides
- Species: P. sieboldii

Binomial name
- Pristipomoides sieboldii (Bleeker, 1855)

Synonyms
- Chaetopterus sieboldii Bleeker, 1855; Chaetopterus dubius Günther, 1859; Aprion microdon Steindachner, 1876; Pristipomoides microdon (Steindachner, 1876); Bowersia ulaula Jordan & Evermann, 1903

= Pristipomoides sieboldii =

Species of fish

Pristipomoides sieboldii, the lavender jobfish, lavender snapper or von Siebold's snapper, is a species of ray-finned fish, which is a snapper belonging to the family Lutjanidae. It is found in the Indian and Pacific Oceans.

== Taxonomy ==
Pristipomoides multidens was first formally described in 1871 as Chaetopterus sieboldii by the Dutch ichthyologist, herpetologist and physician Pieter Bleeker in with its type locality given as Nagasaki. Bleeker did not specify who he was honouring in the specific name but it is thought likely to have been German physician and traveller, Philipp Franz von Siebold, who collected many fishes as specimens which were then described in the monograph series, Fauna Japonica, published by the Rijksmuseum van Natuurlijke Historie in Leiden between 1833 and 1850.

== Description ==
Pristipomoides sieboldii has an elongated, robust body which has a depth of roughly 30–40% of its standard length. The space between the eyes is flat and it has a slightly protruding lower jaw. In both upper and lower jaws there is an outer row of conical and canine-like teeth and an inner band of bristle-like teeth. The vomerine teeth are arranged in a diamond-shaped patch and there are teeth on the tongue. The dorsal fin has 10 spines and 11 soft rays while the anal fin contains 3 spines and 8 soft rays. The bases of both the dorsal and anal fins lack scales and the last soft ray of each of these fins is extended into a short filament. The pectoral fins are long extending as far as the anus and contain 16 rays. The caudal fin is forked. The overall colour is silvery with a lavender tint. The top of the head is marked with dark spots which are more noticeable in younger fish. The dorsal fin has an orange margin while the caudal fin is purplish with a pale margins on the fork. This species attains a maximum total length of 79 cm (31 in), although 40 cm (16 in) is more typical, and a maximum published weight of 8.6 kg (19 lb).

== Distribution, habitat and biology ==
Pristipomoides sieboldii has a wide Indo-Pacific range. It occurs from the Red Sea and East Africa as far south as South Africa through the coasts and islands of the Indian Ocean into the Pacific Ocean where its range extends eastwards to Hawaii, north to Japan. This is a benthopelagic species found at depths between 140 and 500 m (460 and 1,640 ft)over rocky substrates. It is a predatory species which has a diet consisting largely of fishes, crustaceans, polychaetes, cephalopods and urochordates. They attain sexual maturity at 3 years old and have a lifespan of not more than 8 years.

== Fisheries ==
Pristipomoides sieboldii is common as a food fish in Japan and is an important species to fisheries in Hawaii and in the Great Barrier Reef/Torres Strait fishery in Australia. In Hawaii it is managed as part of the Deep 7 bottomfish hook and line fishery unit. It's taken with bottom longlines and deep handlines. The catch is sold fresh.
