= Charles Nouette =

French photographer and explorer

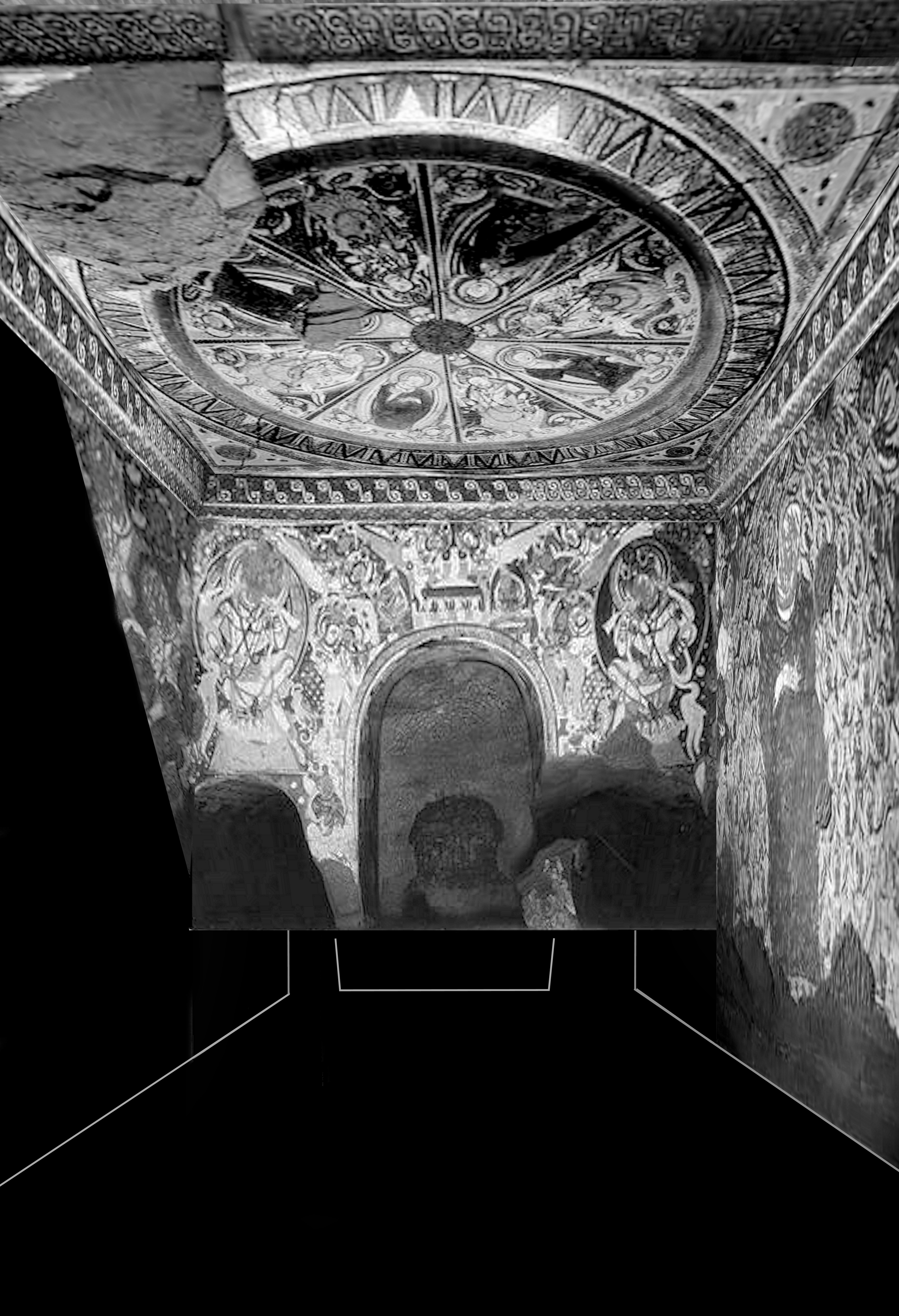
The Cave of the Ring-bearing doves in Kizil Caves, as recorded by Charles Nouette in 1907

Charles Nouette (1869 – 2 May 1910) was a French photographer and explorer who was a member of Paul Pelliot's archaeological expedition to Eastern ("Chinese") Turkestan, modern Xinjiang in 1906–1908.

At the time there was great scientific rivalry between the French, British, Germans, Russians and Japanese in the area. Pelliot, accompanied by Nouette as official photographer and Louis Vaillant as expedition doctor, set out from St Petersburg on 17 June 1906 and proceeded via Bokhara, Kashgar, Ürümqi and Turfan, before eventually reaching Beijing in the summer of 1909.

From June to September 1907 the expedition was in Kucha, and Charles Nouette visited and photographed the Kizil Caves in early September. In March 1908 the expedition visited Dunhuang. The numerous cave manuscripts that were purchased and subsequently studied by Pelliot are now kept in the National Library of France, the Bibliothèque nationale.

Nouette's photographs of the exhibition are preserved in the collection of the Musée Guimet, the French National Museum of Asiatic Art, in Paris.
