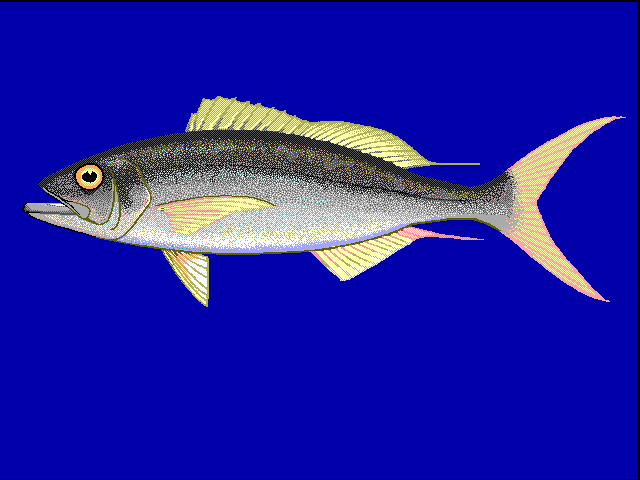

Conservation status
- Least Concern (IUCN 3.1)

Scientific classification
- Kingdom: Animalia
- Phylum: Chordata
- Class: Actinopterygii
- Order: Acanthuriformes
- Family: Lutjanidae
- Genus: Aphareus
- Species: A. rutilans

Binomial name
- Aphareus rutilans (Cuvier, 1830)

Synonyms
- Aphareus thompsoni Fowler, 1923

= Aphareus rutilans =

Species of fish

Aphareus rutilans, the rusty jobfish, ironjaw snapper, red smalltooth job, silvermouth or small tooth jobfish, is a species of marine ray-finned fish, a snapper belonging to the family Lutjanidae. It is found in the Indo-Pacific region.

== Description ==
Aphareus rutilans has an elongated, compressed and fusiform body. It has a lower jaw which projects beyond the upper and the mouth extends to the centreline of the eye. It has a flat area between the eyes. The jaws are quilted with thin bands of small teeth and there are no teeth on the roof of the mouth. The dorsal fin has 10 spines and 10, occasionally 11, soft rays while the anal fin has 3 spines and 8 soft rays. These fins lack scales. The rearmost ray in both the dorsal and anal fins are elongated. The caudal fin is deeply forked or lunate in shape. The overall colour is bluish-grey to mauve or reddish with the dorsal, pectoral and caudal fins being yellowish to reddish. The lips of the upper jaw are dark. This species attains a maximum total length of 110 cm (43 in), although 79 cm (31 in) is more typical, and a maximum weight of 11.3 kg (25 lb).

== Distribution ==
Aphareus rutilans has a wide Indo-Pacific distribution. It extends from the Gulf of Aqaba in Israel and Jordan south through the Red Sea and along the East African coast as far south as South Africa through the Indian Ocean, including its islands, and east into the Pacific Ocean. In the Pacific its range extends east to Hawaii, north to the Ryukyu and Ogasawara islands of southern Japan and south to Australia. in Australia it is found at the Scott Reef of Western Australia, in the Arafura Sea off the Northern Territory, and the northern Great Barrier Reef as well as reefs in the Coral Sea off Queensland. The larvae have been recorded as far south as Crowdy Head in New South Wales.

== Habitat and biology ==
Aphareus rutilans is found at depths between 10 and 330 m (33 and 1,083 ft) where it is found in reefs and areas with rocky bottoms, although it is most common at depths of 100 to 250 m (330 to 820 ft). It is a predatory species which feeds on fish, squid and crustaceans. Spawning was recorded as taking place in the spring and summer in Vanuatu, reaching its peak in November and December.

== Taxonomy ==
Aphareus rutilans was first formally described in 1830 by the French zoologist Georges Cuvier with the type locality given as the Red Sea but it may also have been Mauritius or Indonesia. The specific name rutilans means "rusty", a reference to the reddish colour of the back and fins.

== Fisheries ==
Aphareus rutilans is frequently encountered in fish markets in its range, it is largely caught using handlines and vertical long lines. It is also caught by spear fishing. It is a locally common species throughout much of its range and so makes up an important component of the catch for many deep water fisheries. In Hawaii it is not targeted and is caught as bycatch, the stock is considered to have been depleted and catch limits have been imposed.
