= Fernand Grenard =

French explorer, author, and diplomat (1866–1945)

- Born: 4 July 1866; Second French Empire
- Died: 1 April 1945 (aged 78)

Joseph-Fernand Grenard (4 July 1866 – 1 April 1945) was a French explorer, author, and diplomat. He took part in the French government-sponsored expedition led by Jules-Léon Dutreuil de Rhins in 1891 to Eastern Turkestan (now Xinjiang) which sought to visit Lhasa, which at that time foreigners were not allowed to visit.

In 1893, Dutreuil de Rhins and Grenard, left Xinjiang in order to cross Tibet and reach Xining in Qinghai. In December, they reached Lake Namtso, the men and animals exhausted and their supplies run out after a journey that had taken them three months longer than anticipated. The authorities refused them permission to enter Lhasa and ordered them to turn back, in spite of the bitter cold and lack of supplies.

The following summer, Dutreuil de Rhins was wounded in a skirmish with a group of Golok bandits in lawless country near Tom-Boumdo (province of Qinghai). Grenard tried to save him but in the end was forced to leave him to his death. All the expedition's papers were stolen but eventually Grenard persuaded the Chinese authorities to take action against the criminals and the papers were recovered.

Grenard published a report on the expedition under the title "Mission scientifique dans la Haute-Asie" ("A scientific mission to upper Asia") (1897–1898). He went on to write various books about the history of Central Asia, including lives of Genghis Khan and Babur of the Mughal Empire.

== Bibliography ==
- "Mission scientifique dans la Haute-Asie 1890-1895", in three volumes, E. Leroux, Paris, 1897-1898 (vol. 1, vol. 2, vol. 3)
- "Tibet. The country and its inhabitants", tr. A. Teixeira de Mattos. (London, Hutchinson & co., 1904; republished 2007, Kessinger Publishing, LLC) ISBN 143267031X, ISBN 9781432670313 (described as a partial reprint of 'A scientific mission to upper Asia')
- "Baber"
- "Baber, first of the Moguls", tr. and adap. H. White & R. (Glaenzer, 1971, Natraj Publishers, Dehra Dun; republished 2005, Kessinger Publishing, LLC) ISBN 1417907932, ISBN 978-1417907939
- "Gengis-Khan"
- "Grandeur et décadence de l'Asie"
- "La Révolution Russe", Colin, Paris (1933)
- "Tibet"

== Other sources ==
- Mission scientifique dans la Haute-Asie 1890-1895
- Archives nationales : Mission Dutreuil de Rhins en Haute Asie
