= Jules-Léon Dutreuil de Rhins =

French geographer and explorer (1846–1894)

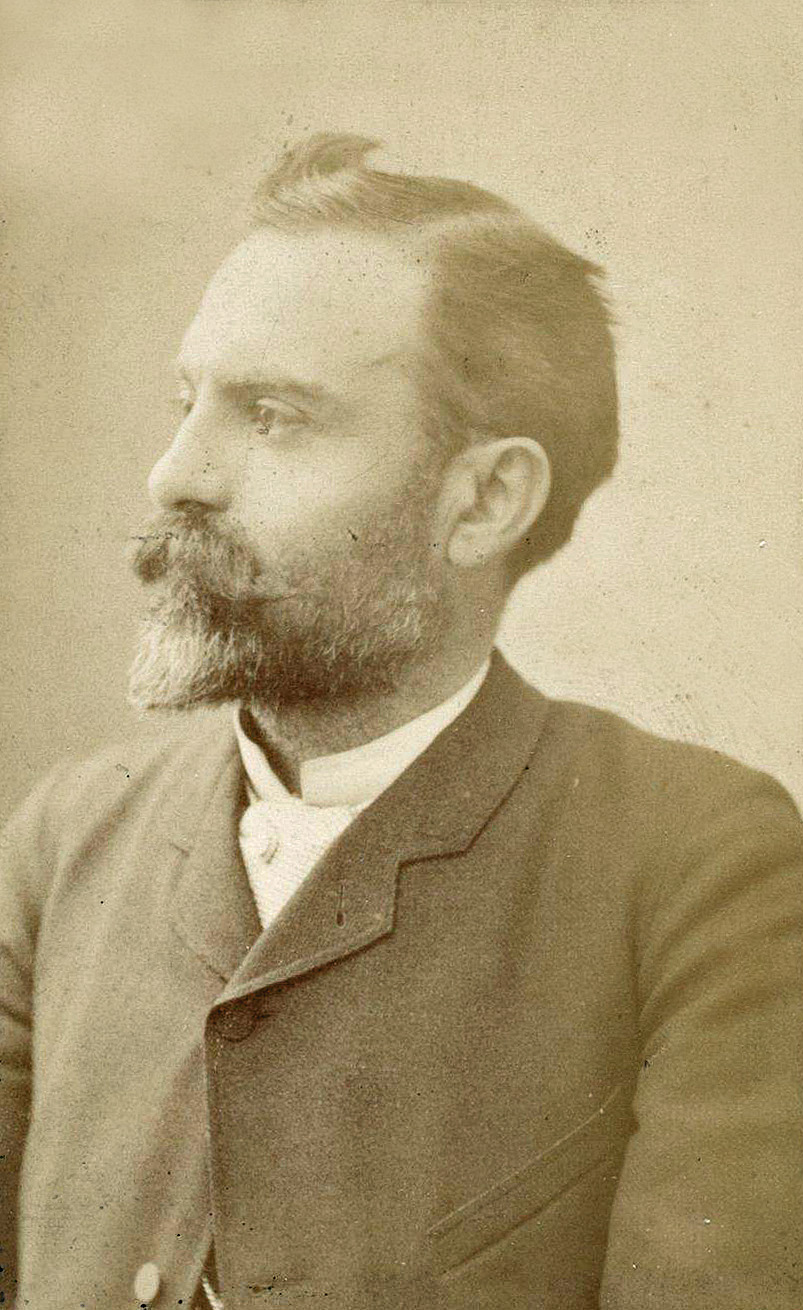
Jules-Léon Dutreuil de Rhins

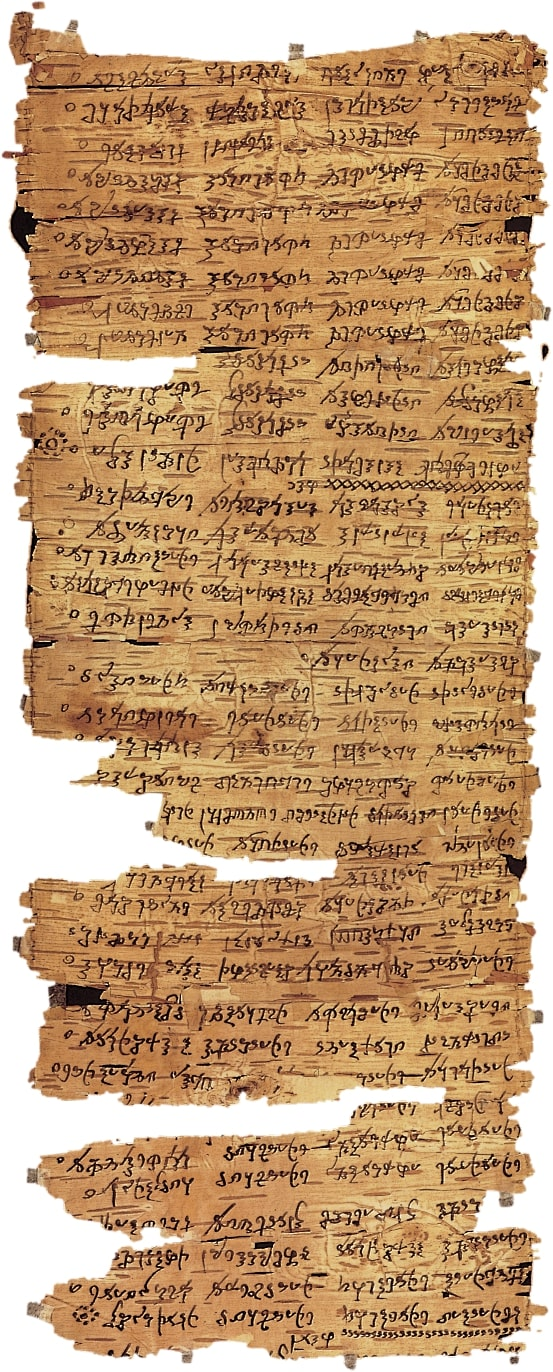
Incomplete birchbark manuscript of the Dhammapada in Gandhari language acquired by the Dutreuil de Rhins mission in Central Asia. End of the 1st century to 3rd century. Bibliothèque nationale de France

Jules Léon Dutreuil de Rhins (2 January 1846 – 5 June 1894) was a French geographer and explorer, born at Saint-Étienne.

He took part as a midshipman of naval volunteers in the expedition to Mexico and was an ensign during the Franco-Prussian War. From 1871 to 1876 he was captain of a foreign-going ship, in 1876–1877 commanded the Scorpion of the King of Annam's navy, and in 1882 was Egyptian correspondent of the Temps. From 1891 to 1894 he explored Chinese Turkestan (East Turkestan) and the most inaccessible and least-known regions of northern and western Tibet. He was murdered by locals at a small town in eastern Tibet.

== Published works ==
His publications include:

- Le royaume d'Annam (1879).
- Carte de l'Indo-Chine orientale (1881).
- Levé du cours de l'Ogooué (1884).
- L'Asia centrale (1889).

The results of his last journey were edited by his assistant, Fernand Grenard, Mission scientifique dans la Haute-Asie (three volumes, 1897–1899):

- Mission Scientifique dans la Haute Asie 1890-1895 : vol.1.
- Mission Scientifique dans la Haute Asie 1890-1895 : vol.2.
- Mission Scientifique dans la Haute Asie 1890-1895 : vol.3.
