= Highfin snapper =

Highfin snapper is a common name for several fish and may refer to:

- Symphorus nematophorus
- Symphorichthys spilurus
