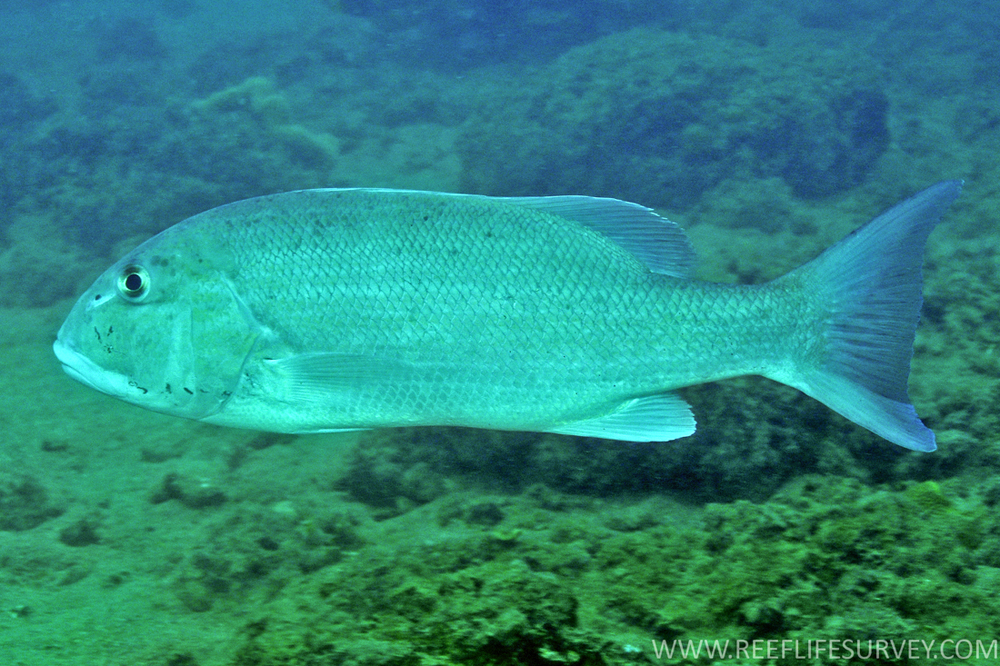
- Symphorus nematophorus
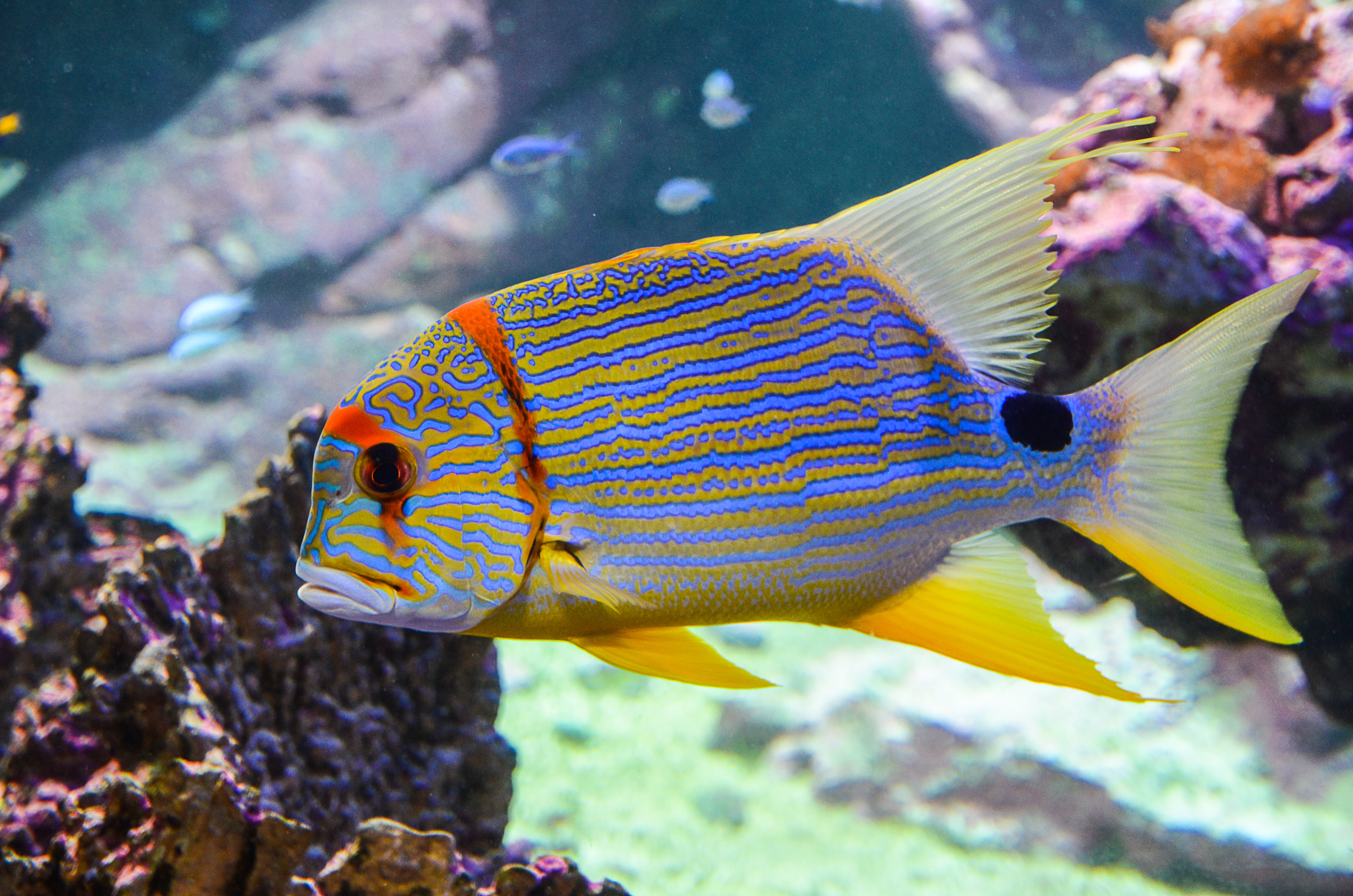
- Symphorichthys spilurus

Scientific classification
- Kingdom: Animalia
- Phylum: Chordata
- Class: Actinopterygii
- Order: Acanthuriformes
- Family: Lutjanidae
- Subfamily: Paradicichthyinae; Whitley, 1930

= Paradicichthyinae =

Subfamily of ray-finned fishes

Paradicichthyinae is a subfamily of marine ray-finned fishes, one of four subfamilies classified within the family Lutjanidae, the snappers.

== Taxonomy ==
Paradicichthyinae was created as a subfamily of the Lutjanidae in 1930 by the Australian ichthyologist Gilbert Percy Whitley with its type species being Paradicichthys venenatus which Whitley described at the same time. Whtley's P. venenatus was later shown to be a synonym of Symphorus nematophorus which had been described by the Dutch ichthyologist Pieter Bleeker in 1860. Whitley's name for the subfamily was retained as he was the first to identify and describe this taxon.

== Genera ==
The subfamily Paradicichthyinae contains 2 genera and 2 species:

- genus Symphorichthys Munro, 1967
- genus Symphorus Günther, 1872
