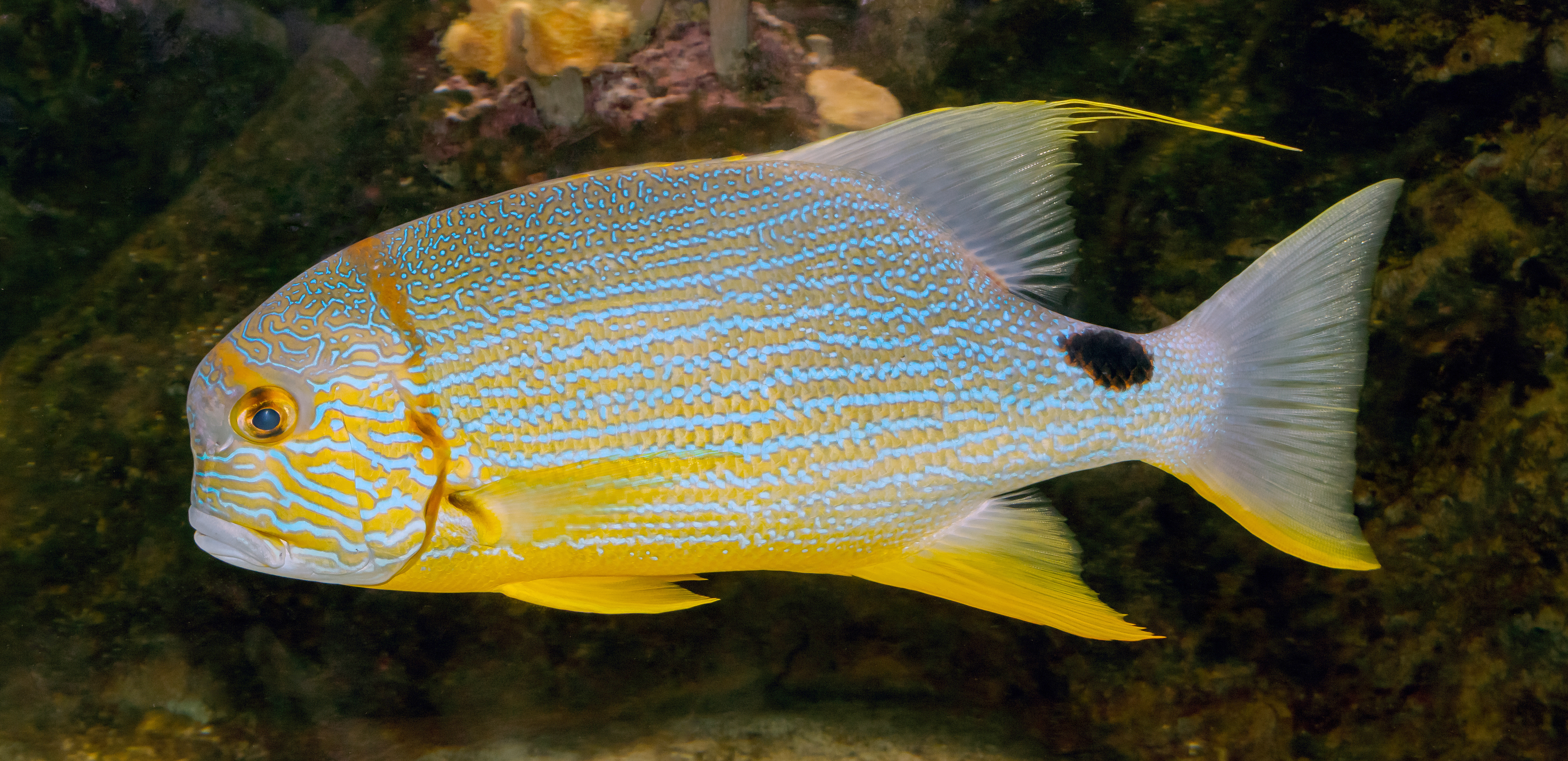

Conservation status
- Least Concern (IUCN 3.1)

Scientific classification
- Kingdom: Animalia
- Phylum: Chordata
- Class: Actinopterygii
- Order: Acanthuriformes
- Family: Lutjanidae
- Subfamily: Paradicichthyinae
- Genus: Symphorichthys; Munro, 1967
- Species: S. spilurus

Binomial name
- Symphorichthys spilurus (Günther, 1874)

Synonyms
- Symphorus spilurus Günther, 1874

= Sailfin snapper =

Species of fish

The sailfin snapper (Symphorichthys spilurus), blue-lined sea bream or blue-lined sea perch is a species of marine ray-finned fish, a snapper belonging to the family Lutjanidae. It is native to the Indo-Pacific region. The sailfin snapper is targeted in mixed-species fisheries throughout its range. In areas such as the Philippines it is known to be overfished, while in others, for example Palau, pressure is lighter. It is caught predominantly using handlines and bottom trawling. The juveniles appear in the aquarium trade. It is currently the only known member of its genus.

== Taxonomy ==
The sailfin snapper was first formally described in 1874 by the German-born British ichthyologist Albert Günther as Symphorus spilurus with the type locality given as Palau. The Australian marine scientist Ian Stafford Ross Munro placed it in the monotypic genus Symphorichthys in 1967. The genus Symphorichthys is one of two genera in the subfamily Paradicichthyinae of the snapper family Lutjanidae. The genus name Symphorichthys is a reference to the former classification within the genus Symphorus. The specific name spilurus is a compound of spilos meaning "spot" and urus meaning "tail", a reference to the sizeable black blotch on the dorsal surface of the adults' caudal peduncle.

== Description ==
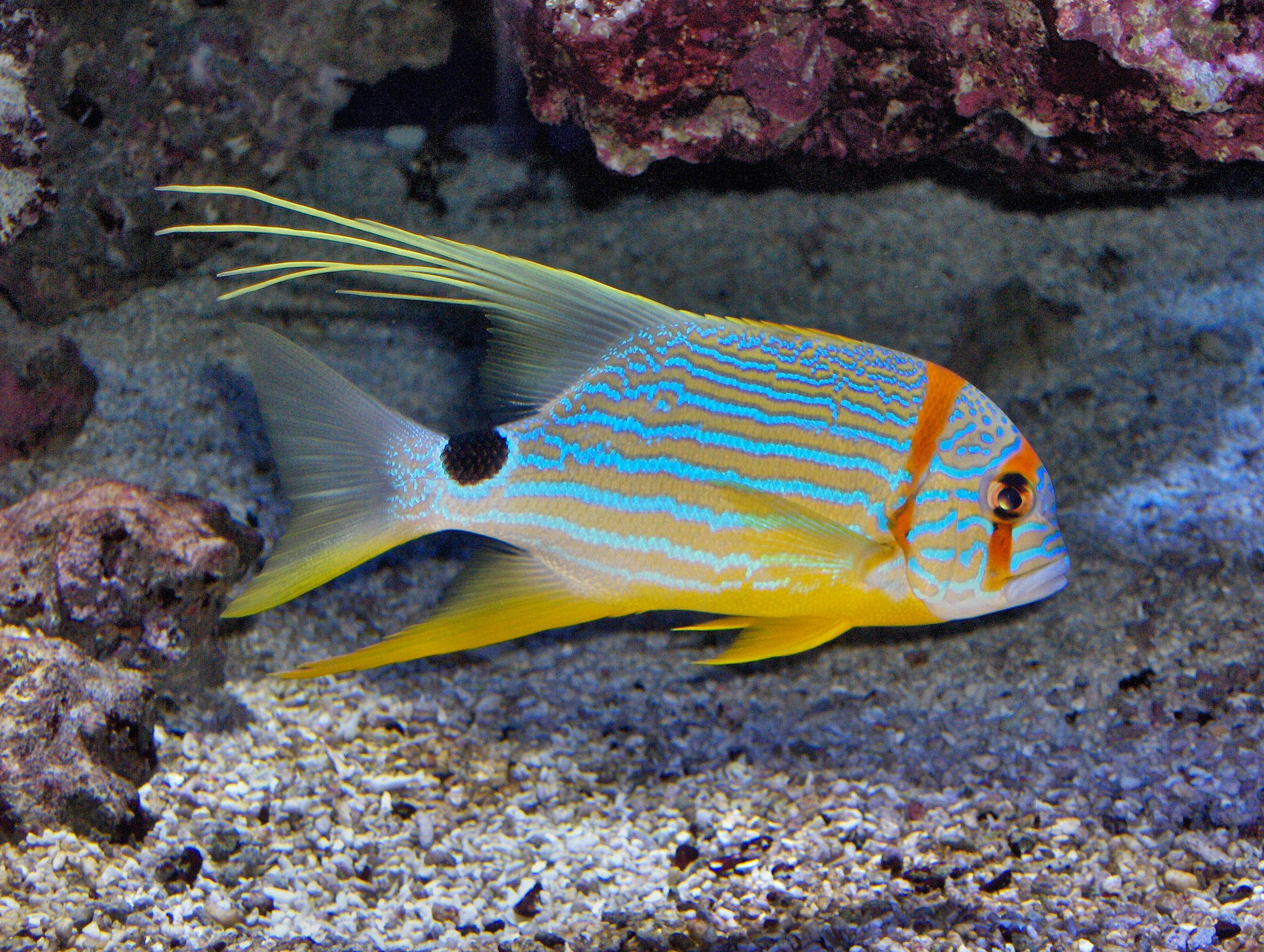
At the Musée Océanographique de Monaco

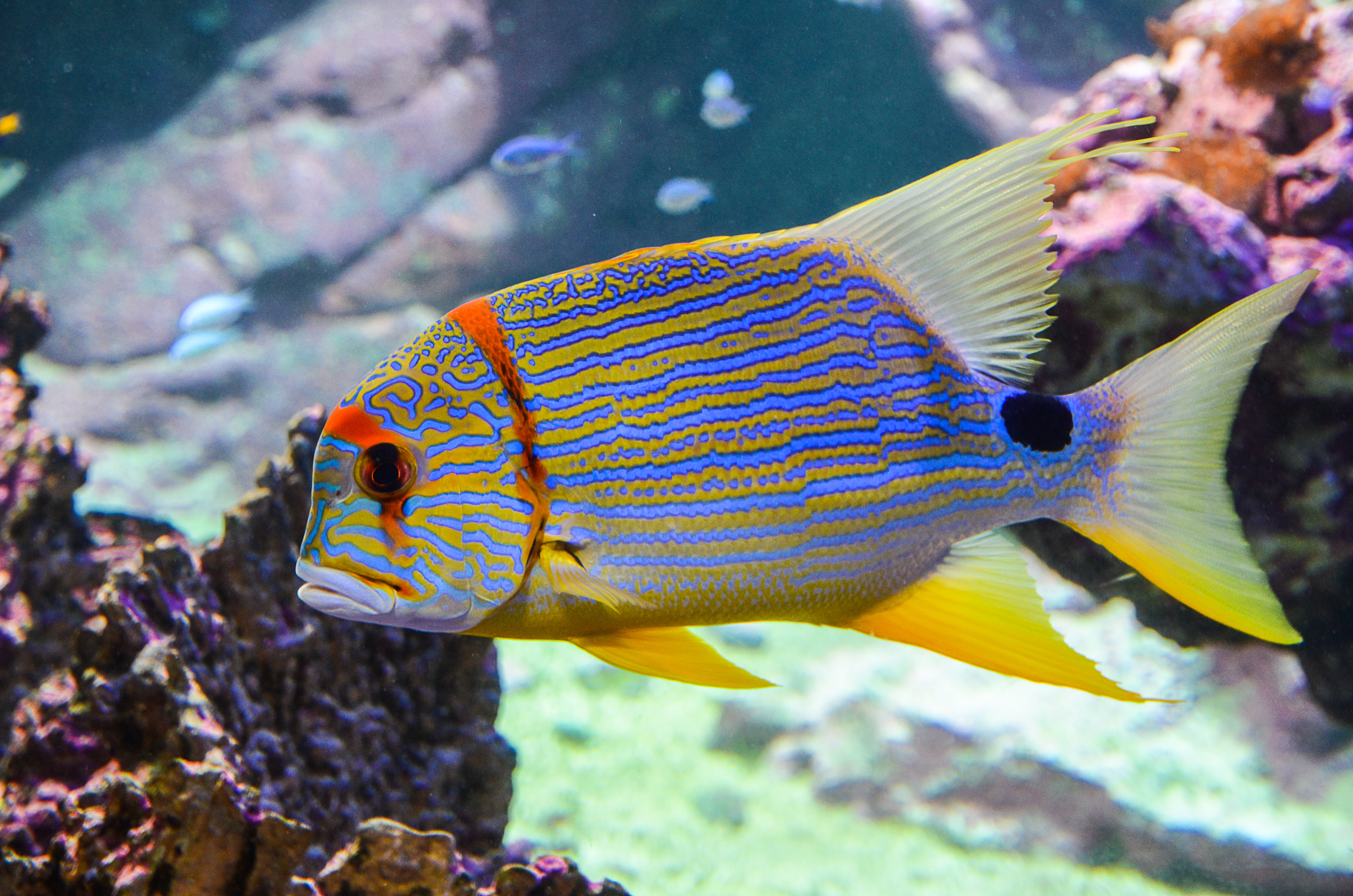
At Cité de la Mer

The sailfin snapper has a body which is deep and laterally compressed with a rounded dorsal profile of the head, an angular forehead and a steeply sloped snout. The mouth extends as far back as the anterior edge of the eye. There is no incision or protuberance on the preoperculum. The upper jaw has a row of small, flattened teeth with roughly 3 rows in the lower jaw, both jaws have an outer row of short conical teeth, a little bigger than the other teeth. There is no patch of vomerine teeth. The dorsal fin has 10 spine and 14–18 soft rays while the anal fin contains 3 spines and 8–11 soft rays. At least one of the anterior soft rays in both the dorsal and anal fins extends beyond the fin membrane to create a long filament. The pectoral fins are long, sometimes extending past the level of the anus and contain 16 fin rays. The caudal fin is emarginate. This species attains a maximum total length of 60 cm (24 in), although of 50 cm (20 in) is more typical. The colour of the body is yellowish body with blue horizontal stripes along the flanks. There is a large pale-margined black spot on the upper caudal peduncle, an orange bar over the eye and another to the rear of the head. The juveniles have an overall pale greyish colour broken by a wide white-bordered black stripe running along the middle of the flanks from the snout to the rear margin of the tail. The juveniles have the elongated filaments in the dorsal and anal fin but these are yellowish.

== Distribution and habitat ==
The sailfin snapper is found in the eastern Indian Ocean and the western Pacific Ocean. In the Indian Ocean it occurs at the Rowley Shoals and near Broome, Western Australia. In the Pacific Ocean it is found east as far as Tonga and Fiji, north to the Ryukyu Islands and south to New Caledonia and the Great Barrier Reef. There are also records from the Mentawai Islands off western Sumatra and off the west coast of Thailand. It occurs at depths between 5 and 60 m (16 and 197 ft). It lives in areas of sand near to reefs in lagoons and over outer reefs.

== Biology ==
The sailfin snapper is typically encountered singly but adults aggregate to spawn along the outer edges of reefs. They forage in the sand for benthic crustaceans and molluscs as well as preying on fishes.

== Fisheries ==
The sailfin snapper is targeted in mixed-species fisheries throughout its range. In areas such as the Philippines it is known to be overfished, while in others, for example Palau, pressure is lighter. It is caught predominantly using handlines and bottom trawling. The juveniles appear in the aquarium trade.
