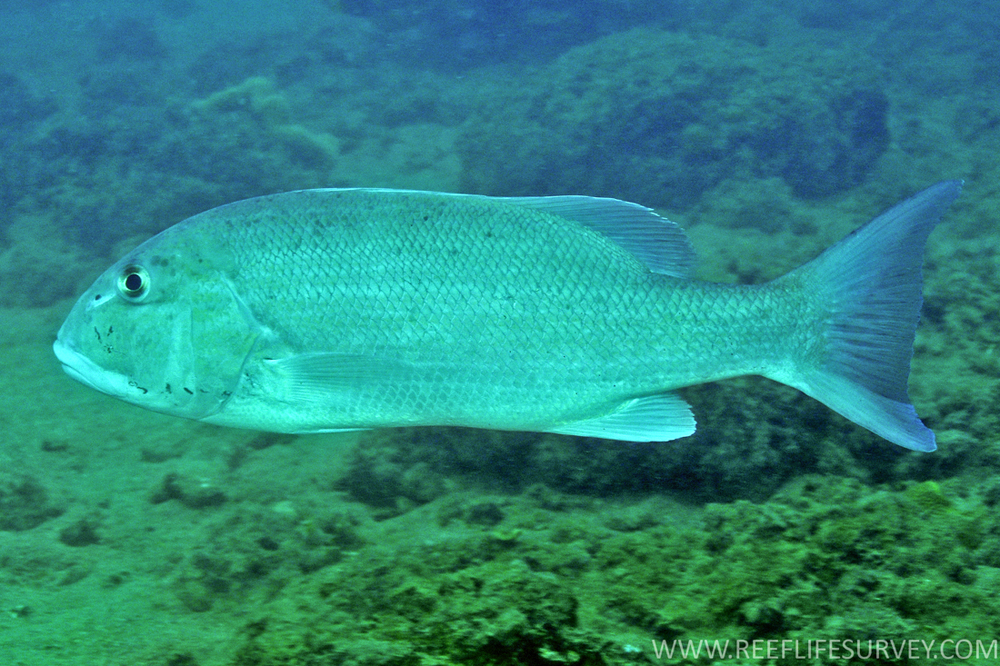
- Mornington Island, Wellesley Islands group, Gulf of Carpentaria, Queensland

Conservation status
- Least Concern (IUCN 3.1)

Scientific classification
- Kingdom: Animalia
- Phylum: Chordata
- Class: Actinopterygii
- Order: Acanthuriformes
- Family: Lutjanidae
- Subfamily: Paradicichthyinae
- Genus: Symphorus; Günther, 1872
- Species: S. nematophorus

Binomial name
- Symphorus nematophorus (Bleeker, 1860)

Synonyms
- For genus: Glabrilutjanus Fowler, 1931; Paradicichthys Whitley, 1930; For species: Mesoprion nematophorus Bleeker, 1860; Glabrilutjanus nematophorus (Bleeker, 1860); Lutjanus nematophorus (Bleeker, 1860); Symporichthys nematophorus (Bleeker, 1860); Symphorus taeniolatus Günther, 1872; Paradicichthys venenatus Whitley, 1930; Symphorus forsteri Fowler, 1933

= Chinamanfish =

Species of fish

The Chinamanfish (Symphorus nematophorus), Chinaman snapper, galloper or thread-finned sea perch, is species of marine ray-finned fish, a snapper belonging to the family Lutjanidae. It is found in the Western Pacific Ocean.

== Taxonomy ==
The Chinamanfish was first formally described in 1860 by the Dutch ichthyologist Pieter Bleeker as Mesoprion nematophorus with the type locality given as Badjoa on Sulawesi. the German-born British ichthyologist Albert Günther Symphorus in 1872. The genus Symphorus is one of two genera in the subfamily Paradicichthyinae of the snapper family Lutjanidae. The genus name Symphorus was not explained by Günther but it may be a compound of sym, meaning "together with" and phorus meaning "bearer", a possible a reference to its undivided dorsal fin. The specific name nematophorus is also a compound, this time having "nemato" meaning "thread" prefixing phorus, a reference to the projection of at least one the anterior rays of the dorsal fins in to filaments in the younger specimens.

== Description ==
The Chinamanfish has a body which is deep and laterally compressed, with a steep dorsal profile of the head. There is a deep slit between the eyes and the nostrils. The mouth extends as far back as the centre of the eye. There is no incision or protuberance on the preoperculum. The jaws have thin bands of teeth with the outer band having enlarged teeth, these are canione-like at the front of the upper jaw. There is no patch of vomerine teeth and there is a patch of granular teeth on the tongue. The dorsal fin has 10 spine and 15-16 soft rays while the anal fin contains 3 spines and 9 soft rays. At least one of the anterior dorsal fin rays is projected into a long filamentous thread in juveniles and sub-adults. The pectoral fins are long, extending as far as the level of the anus and contain 16 fin rays. The caudal fin is emarginate. This species attains a maximum total length of 100 cm (39 in), although of 35 cm (14 in) is more typical. and a maximum published weight of13.2 kg (29 lb). The overall colour of this snapper is greyish-brown to reddish frequently broken by thick irregular light and dark vertical bars on the flanks. The juveniles are light orange to brownish, with irregular bluish lines and spots on the head and flanks, and more numerous long filamentous dorsal-fin rays than the adults.

== Distribution and habitat ==
The Chinamanfish is a widely distributed species in the West Pacific Ocean from the Andaman Sea and western Thailand east to Fiji and Tonga and from northern Australia and New Caledonia north to the Ryukyu Islands. It is found at depths of less than 50 m (160 ft). It is found on coastal reefs.

== Biology ==
The Chinamanfish is typically encountered as solitary fishes but a breeding aggregation has been recorded off Palau. It is mainly piscivorous. The maximum longevity of this species is 36 years.

== Fisheries ==
The Chinamanfish is taken mostly with handlines and also by spearfishing. Its flesh is considered to be excellent eating, however in Queensland and Vanuatu it is considered dangerous, and Australia bans its sale, due to the risk of ciguatera.
