= Cairns Aquarium =

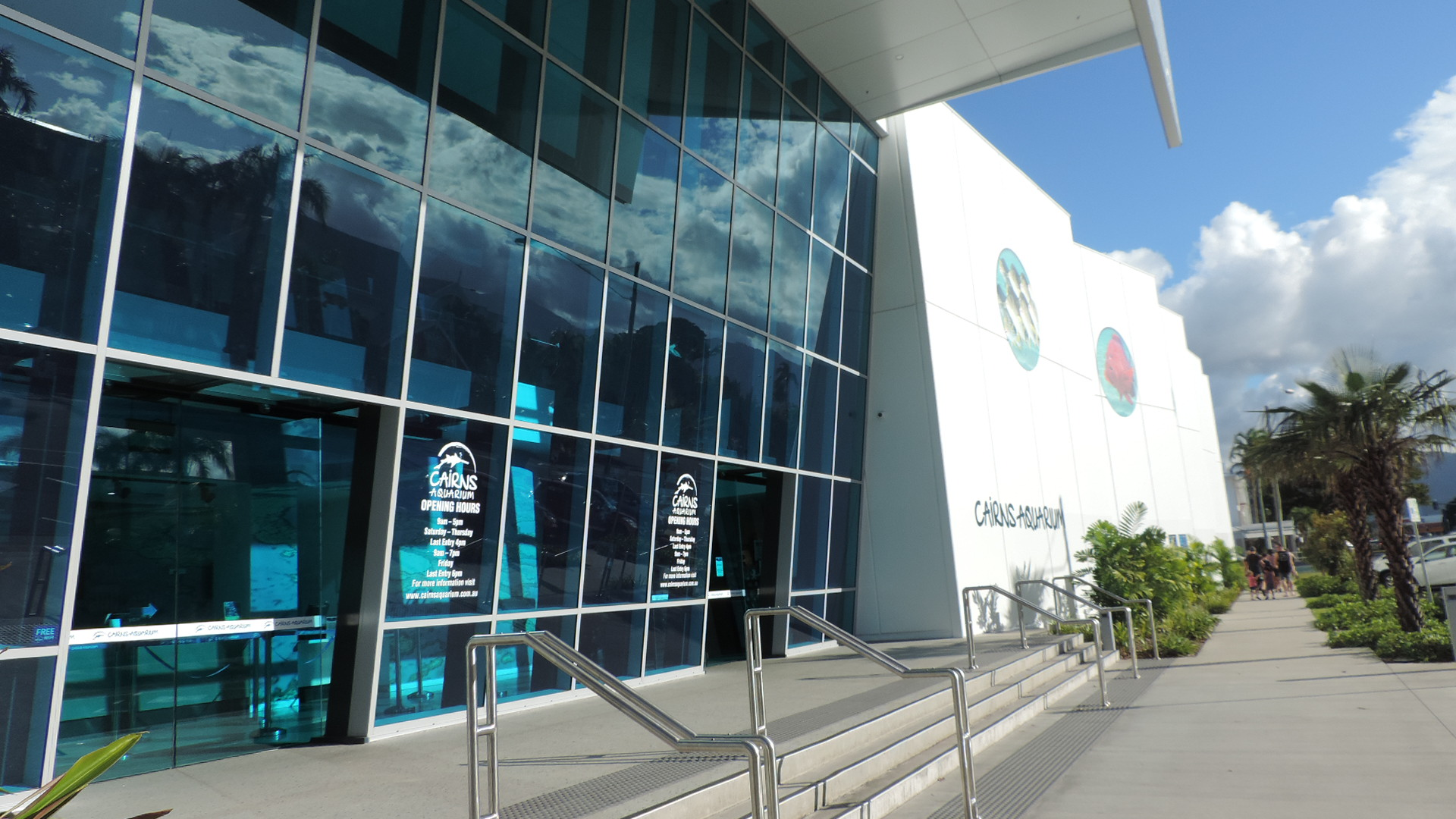
- Entrance to the Cairns Aquarium, Florence Street, 2018
- Interactive map of Cairns Aquarium
- 16°55′06″S 145°46′26″E
- Date opened: 2017
- Location: 5 Florence Street, Cairns City, Cairns, Queensland, Australia
- Land area: 7,800 m (25,600 ft)
- No. of animals: 15,000+
- Volume of largest tank: 1,800,000 L (480,000 US gal)
- Total volume of tanks: 3,000,000 L (790,000 US gal)
- Major exhibits: 71 tanks in 10 ecosystems
- Website: www.cairnsaquarium.com.au

Cairns Aquarium is a public aquarium in Cairns, Australia, that opened in 2017. It is home to more than 15,000 animals displayed in 10 ecosystems.

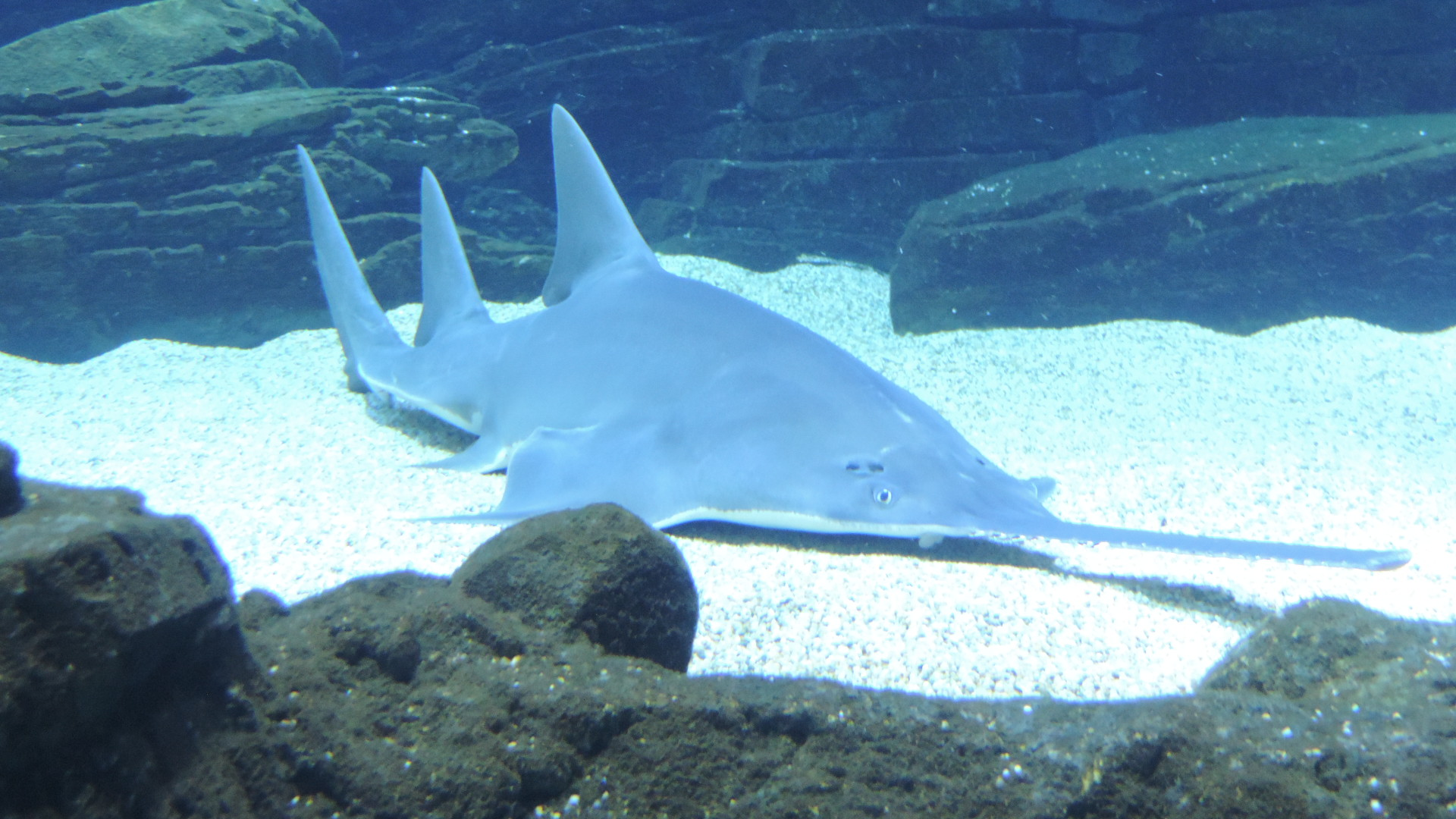
Sawfish, 2018

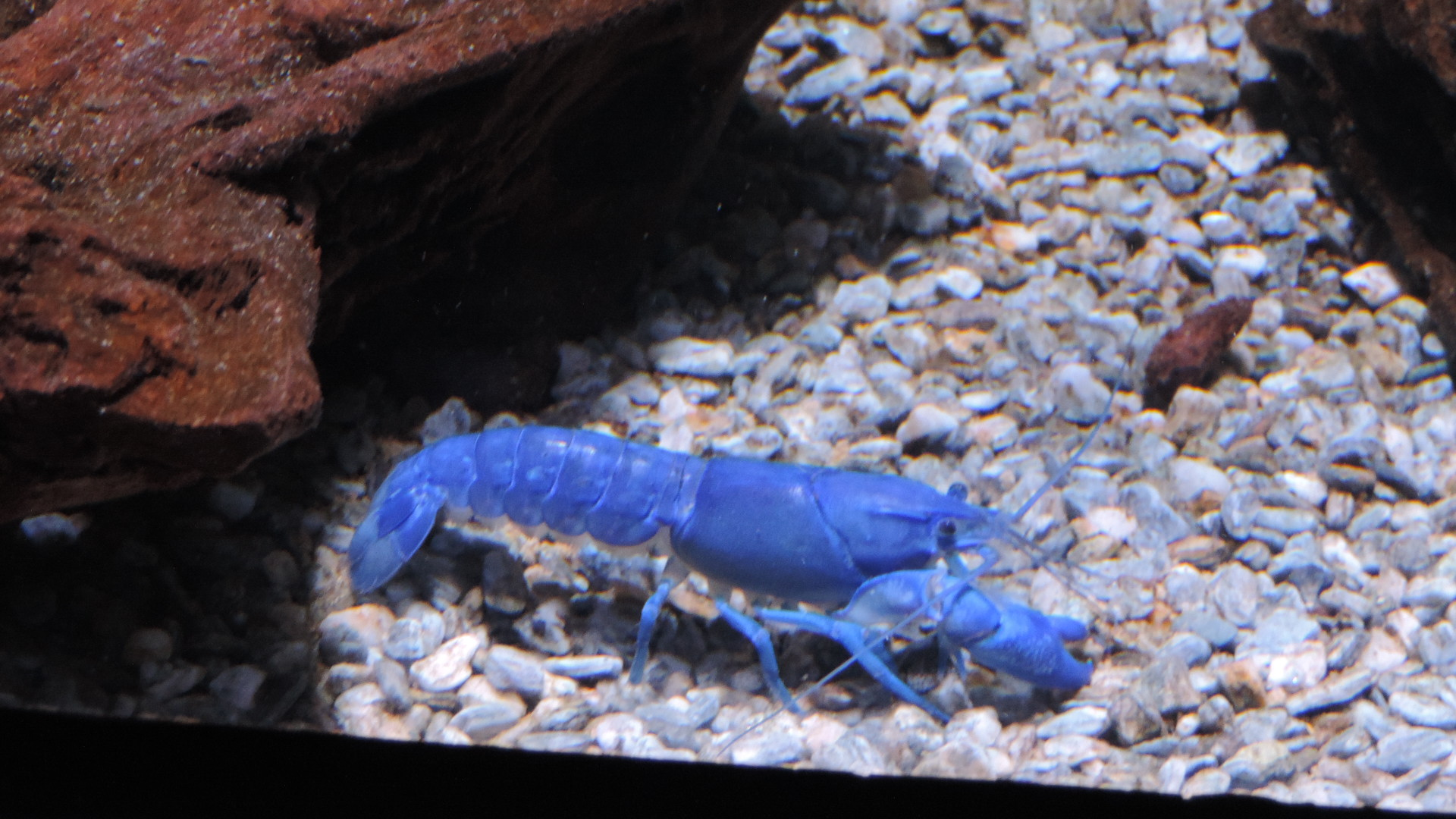
Blue crayfish, 2018

The $54 million, 7,800 m (25,600 ft), three-level facility in Queensland holds 71 tanks, including a 1,800,000 L (480,000 US gal) ocean tank, Australia's largest freshwater tank with 400,000 L (110,000 US gal) of water, a deep reef tank and the world's first true tidal motion tank.

It is among the few aquariums to display endangered or rarely seen species such as the emerald tree monitors, Jardine River turtles, freshwater sawfish and scalloped hammerhead sharks.

Freshwater sawfish and scalloped hammerhead shark are no longer exhibited at Cairns Aquarium. Following the release of the last sawfish kept at the aquarium, the logo was changed to feature a shark instead of a sawfish.

Following the closure of Reef HQ, Cairns Aquarium is the only aquarium worldwide to exhibit captive-bred olive sea snakes.

The aquarium is also an interactive research and education centre and is home to the Cairns Turtle Rehabilitation Centre.

== Exhibits ==
As of 2026, the following exhibits are at Cairns Aquarium:

Rivers and Streams - Species of rainforest waterways in Queensland, including pignose turtle, freshwater moray, bullrout, eel-tailed catfish, redclaw crayfish, jade perch, jungle perch and Queensland lungfish.

Billabong Amphitheatre - Replica of a ephemeral billabong in Queensland's Gulf Country. This is Australia's largest freshwater aquarium, containing 400,000 litres of water. Exhibits freshwater whiptail ray, gulf saratoga, mangrove jack, barramundi, forktail catfish and other large fishes. Formerly, freshwater sawfish was exhibited here.

Rainforest - Reptiles, amphibians and insects from North Queensland rainforests and arid country. Exhibits Boyd's forest dragon, green tree python, Merten's water monitor, Australian mangrove monitor, emerald tree monitor, common keelback, jungle carpet python, spotted python, major skink, amethystine python, frilled lizard, common bluetongue, Jardine River turtle, Cann's snake-necked turtle, white-lipped tree frog, freshwater crocodile, spiny leaf insect, giant burrowing cockroach, and others.

Riversleigh Fossil Trail - replicas of fossils from the Riversleigh World Heritage Area, such as Diprotodon. No live animals are exhibited.

Mangroves - Species of Queensland mangrove forests, including young saltwater crocodile, juvenile pinnate batfish, silver moony, rusty monitor, striped scat, spotted scat, mud crab and upside-down jellyfish.

Great Barrier Reef - organisms of the Great Barrier Reef, including live corals and sea anemones, humphead maori wrasse, epaulette shark, bluespotted ribbontail ray, ornate rock lobster, olive sea snake, volitans lionfish, reef stonefish, moray eels, anemonefishes, crown-of-thorns starfish, longhorn cowfish, common seahorse, shrimpfishes, triggerfishes, blue linckia star, dogface pufferfish, and a range of other reef fishes and invertebrates.

Coral Sea Oceanarium - Replica of a ribbon reef situated in the Coral Sea. Exhibits sharks, rays and large fishes, including grey reef shark, blacktip reef shark, whitetip reef shark, zebra shark, tawny nurse shark, blotched ribbontail ray, mangrove whipray, porcupine ray, reticulated whipray, Australian cownose ray, giant guitarfish, twospot red snapper, Queensland grouper, Malabar grouper, batfishes, unicornfishes and surgeonfishes.

Deep Sea - replicas of deep-sea fishes such as oarfish, viperfish and anglerfish. No live animals are exhibited.

Turtle Rehabilitation Centre - rescued sea turtles are rehabilitated for release. Tours of this facility are available at extra cost, twice daily.

Restaurant Tank - "under the jetty" exhibit viewable from the restaurant adjacent to Cairns Aquarium (as of 2026, Squire's Loft, formerly Dundee's At The Cairns Aquarium). Juvenile zebra shark, brown-banded bamboo shark and reef fishes are displayed here.

== Awards ==
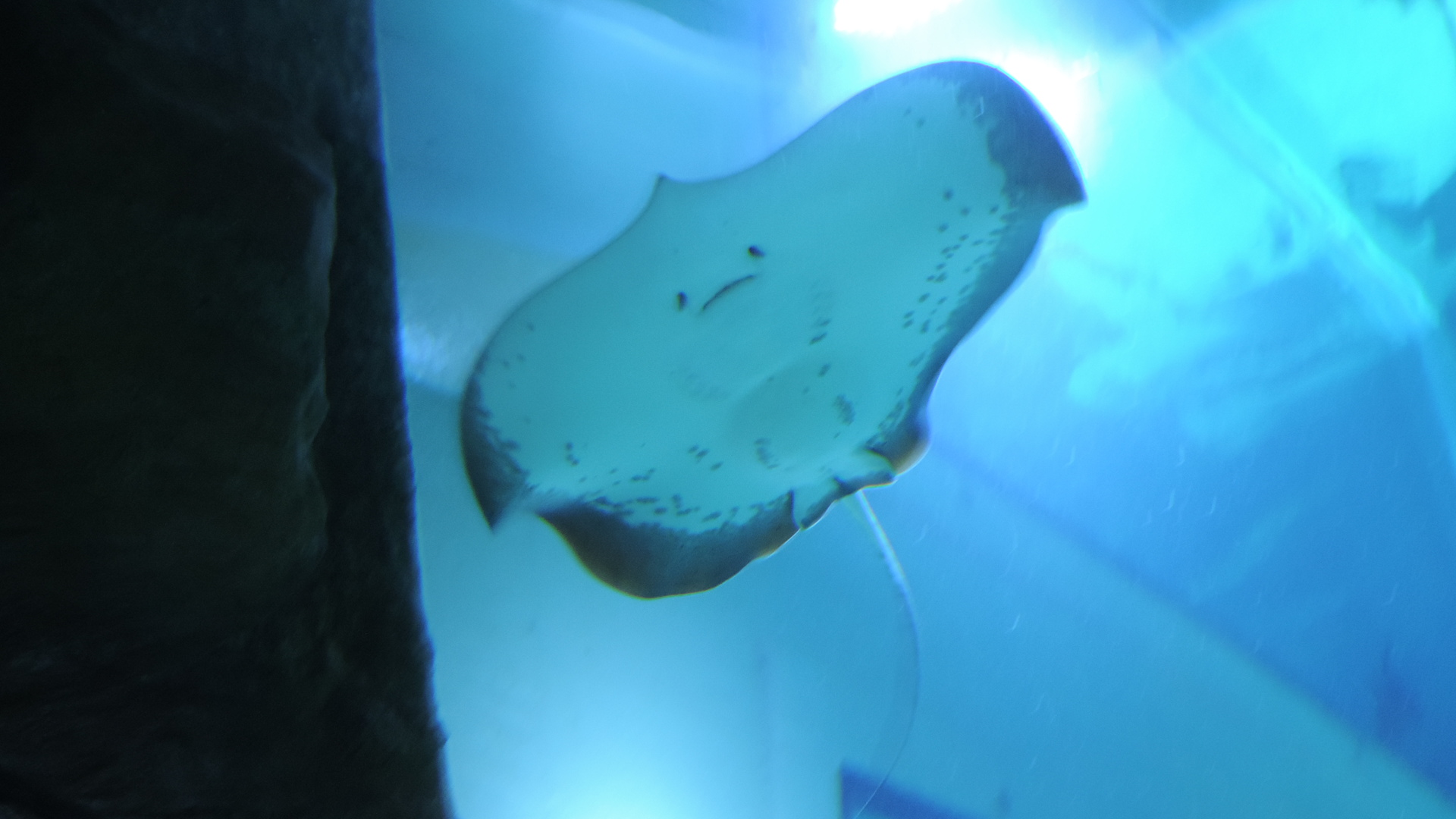
Underside of freshwater whiptail ray in the Billabong Amphitheatre, 2018

In 2018, the aquarium won the Master Builder Queensland award for Project of the Year and the award for Leisure Facilities over $10 million.
