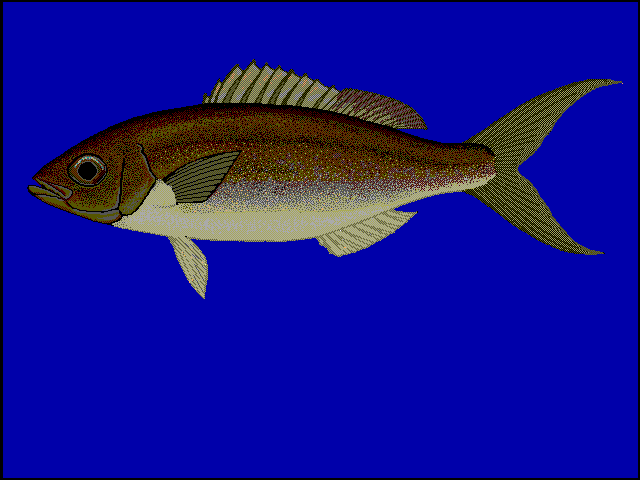
- Apsilus fuscus

Scientific classification
- Kingdom: Animalia
- Phylum: Chordata
- Class: Actinopterygii
- Order: Acanthuriformes
- Family: Lutjanidae
- Subfamily: Apsilinae; Johnson, 1980

= Apsilinae =

Subfamily of ray-finned fishes

Apsilinae is a subfamily of marine ray-finned fishes, one of four subfamilies classified within the family Lutjanidae, the snappers.

== Genera ==
The subfamily Apsilinae contains four genera and 13 species:

- Apsilus Valenciennes, 1230
- Lipocheilus Anderson, Talwar & Johnson, 1977
- Paracaesio Bleeker, 1775
- Parapristipomoides Kami, 1963
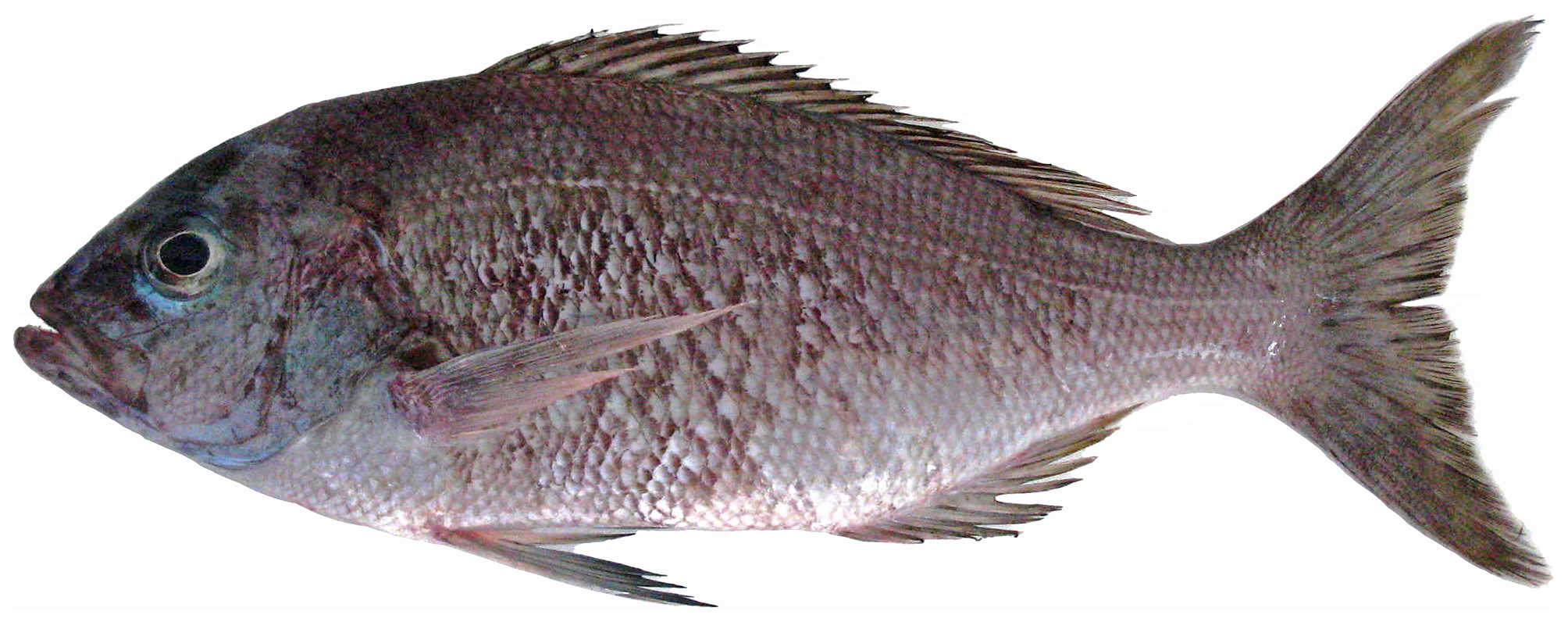
Apsilus dentatus

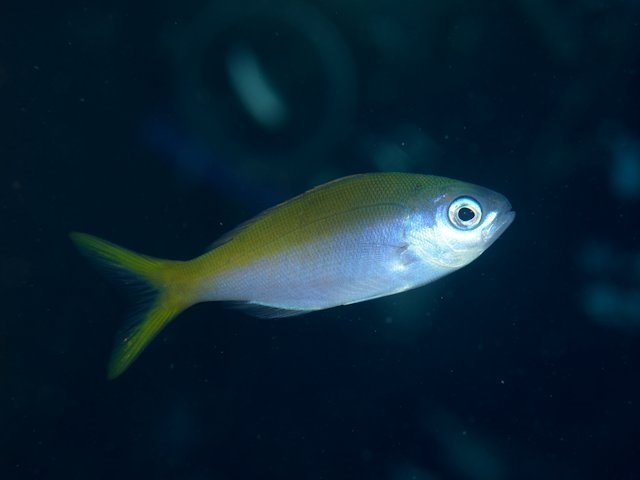
Paracaesio xanthura
