= Black snapper =

Black snapper is a common name for a fish.

Black snapper may refer to:

- Apsilus dentatus, a member of the snapper fish family
- Lutjanus griseus, the snapper fish family found in the coastal waters of the western Atlantic Ocean
- Sistrurus catenatus, a venomous pit viper found mostly in the United States
- Girella tricuspidata, a fish from New Zealand

== See also ==
- Black Snapper International Film Festival, a student film festival in Sydney, Australia
