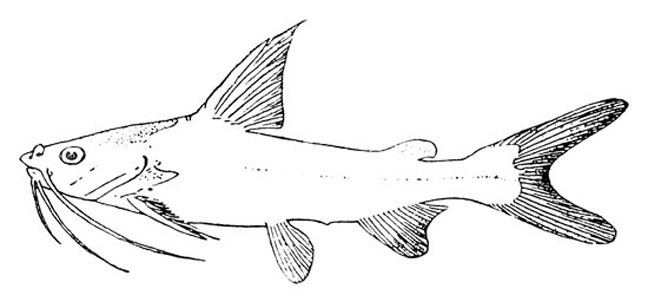
- Neoarius berneyi

Scientific classification
- Kingdom: Animalia
- Phylum: Chordata
- Class: Actinopterygii
- Division: Teleostei
- Order: Siluriformes
- Family: Ariidae
- Subfamily: Ariinae
- Genus: Neoarius; Castelnau, 1878

Type species
- Arius curtisii Castelnau, 1878

Synonyms
- Amissidens Kailola, 2004

= Neoarius =

Genus of fishes

Neoarius is a genus of sea catfishes found on and around the island New Guinea and Australia. They are found in marine, brackish waters and fresh waters with several species restricted solely to freshwater rivers. There are currently six described species in this genus.

== Species ==
- Neoarius berneyi (Whitley, 1941) (Highfin catfish)
- Neoarius graeffei (Kner & Steindachner, 1867) (Blue salmon-catfish)
- Neoarius hainesi (Kailola, 2004) (Ridged catfish)
- Neoarius midgleyi (Kailola & Pierce, 1988) (Silver cobbler)
- Neoarius paucus (Kailola, 2000)
- Neoarius pectoralis (Kailola, 2000) (Sawspine catfish)
