= Neoarius pectoralis =

Scientific classification
- Kingdom: Animalia
- Phylum: Chordata
- Class: Actinopterygii
- Order: Siluriformes
- Family: Ariidae
- Genus: Neoarius
- Species: N. pectoralis

Binomial name
- Neoarius pectoralis (Kailola, 2000)

Synonyms
- Arius pectoralis Kailola, 2000; Ariopsis pectoralis (Kailola, 2000)

Species of catfish

Neoarius pectoralis, the sawspine catfish or sawspined catfish, is a species of catfish in the family Ariidae. It was described by Patricia J. Kailola in 2000, originally under the genus Arius. It inhabits marine and brackish waters in Australia, Irian Jaya, and possibly also Papua New Guinea. It reaches a maximum fork length of 39.3 cm (15.5 in).

The species epithet "pectoralis" derived from the Latin term for "shoulder", was inspired by the prominent, flattened serrae along the spine of the inner pectoral fin on the species.
