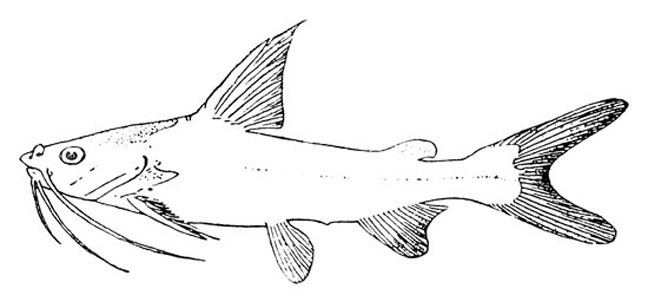

Conservation status
- Least Concern (IUCN 3.1)

Scientific classification
- Kingdom: Animalia
- Phylum: Chordata
- Class: Actinopterygii
- Order: Siluriformes
- Family: Ariidae
- Genus: Neoarius
- Species: N. berneyi

Binomial name
- Neoarius berneyi (Whitley, 1941)

Synonyms
- Ariopsis berneyi; Arius cleptolepis; Arius berneyi; Tachysurus berneyi

= Neoarius berneyi =

Species of fish

Neoarius berneyi, the highfin catfish, Berney's catfish, Berney's shark catfish, or the lesser salmon catfish, is a freshwater sea catfish that is commonly kept in aquariums. The origin of the name Neoarius berneyi is Greek, with the genus name Neoarius coming from the words neos meaning new and arios, meaning warlike or hostile, in reference to the well developed fin spines, and the species name, berneyi, comes from the ornithologist F. L. Berney.

== Distribution and habitat ==
Neoarius berneyi is found around the South Pacific coast areas of Northern Australia and New Guinea. The species also inhabits the coastal streams and rivers of the Gulf of Carpentaria, as far west as the Mary River system. The species holotype, or the physical example of an organism used when the species was formally described, was found in pools of the Flinders River, near Hughenden and Richmond, Queensland, Australia.

== Description ==
Neoarius berneyi is similar to Neoarius graeffei in appearance, but with a smaller eye and a taller dorsal fin. The palatal teeth patches are roughly the same size, inside larger than outside, and the fish is a silvery bronze to a dark gray overall, and paler below. The fish's average size is 380 mm (15 in), and the average weight is 500 g (18 oz). However, members of the genus Neoarius, also known as "shark cats", can grow 914 mm (36.0 in).

== Habitat and diet ==
Neoarius berneyi lives in coastal streams and rivers. N. berneyi appears to favor slow streams, and is often found in turbid conditions. The fish consumes benthic crustaceans, insect larvae, aquatic plants, mice and bottom detritus.

== Conservation status ==
The Australian government lists Neoarius berneyi as "non-threatened".

== Sources ==
- "Arius berneyi * Ariidae * Cat-eLog * PlanetCatfish". planetcatfish.com.
- Ferraris, Carl. "Zootaxa" (PDF). pp. 367–382.
