= Japanese snapper =

Conservation status
- Data Deficient (IUCN 3.1)

Scientific classification
- Kingdom: Animalia
- Phylum: Chordata
- Class: Actinopterygii
- Order: Acanthuriformes
- Family: Lutjanidae
- Genus: Paracaesio
- Species: P. caerulea

Binomial name
- Paracaesio caerulea (Katayama, 1934)

Synonyms
- Vegetichthys caeruleus Katayama, 1934

Species of fish

The Japanese snapper (Paracaesio caerulea) is a species of marine ray-finned fish, a snapper belonging to the family Lutjanidae. It is native to the Western Pacific Ocean.

== Taxonomy ==
The Japanese snapper was first formally described as Vegetichthys caeruleus in 1934 by the Japanese zoologist Masao Katayama with the type locality given as Tokyo Fish Market, the type possibly being caught in the vicinity of Hachijō-jima in the Izu Islands. The specific name caerulea means "blue", a reference to the dominant colour of this fish.

== Description ==
The Japanese snapper has a relatively slender, fusiform body. It has large eyes, the area between the eyes is convex. The jaws are equal in length and are equipped with bands of bristle-like teeth and it has a short snout. The pectoral fins are long, extending as far as the anus. The caudal fin may be slightly forked or lunate. The dorsal fin has 10 spines and 10 soft rays while the anal fin contains 3 spines and 8 soft rays, both of these fins lacking scales. The upper body and flanks are blue fading to whitish or silvery on the abdomen while the dorsal and caudal fins are light yellow and the remaining fins may be whitish or translucent. This species attains a maximum total length of 50 cm (20 in), although 30 cm (12 in) is more typical.

== Distribution and habitat ==
The Japanese snapper occurs in the western Pacific Ocean where it is found off southern Japan, Taiwan and the Chesterfield Islands of New Caledonia. It is found over rocky substrates at depths in excess of 100 m (330 ft).

=== Breeding ===
The spawning season in waters off Japan is thought to be April to September.

== Uses ==
The Japanese snapper is regarded as an important food fish, which is frequently available in fish markets. Fishermen catch it using handlines and bottom longlines, and it is sold fresh. The Japanese name for this species is aodai and the flesh is used in sushi and sashimi, as well as being sautéed, broiled, deep fried or prepared in a soup with miso.
