= Neoarius hainesi =

Scientific classification
- Kingdom: Animalia
- Phylum: Chordata
- Class: Actinopterygii
- Order: Siluriformes
- Family: Ariidae
- Genus: Neoarius
- Species: N. hainesi

Binomial name
- Neoarius hainesi (Kailola, 2000)

Synonyms
- Amissidens hainesi Kailola, 2000; Arius hainesi Kailola, 2000

Species of fish

Neoarius hainesi, the ridged catfish, is a species of sea catfish in the family Ariidae of the order Siluriformes. This species occurs in marine and brackish waters on the southern coast of New Guinea and Northern Australia, between Darwin and southern Gulf of Carpentaria. It was formerly allocated to the monospecific genus Amissidens.

The eyes are large. The lips are fleshy and thin and the mouth is small and almost quadrangular. The barbels are thin and short; the maxillary barbels only reach just beyond eye, and the bases of the chin barbels are close together. The fin spines are thin, long, and slender. The adipose fin has a short base and is over the posterior two-thirds of the anal fin. The ventral fin pad of sexually mature females is scalloped and tapered. It is dark grey above and iridescent purple. This fish reaches about 30.2 centimetres (11.9 in) SL.
