= Tami River rainbowfish =

Conservation status
- Vulnerable (IUCN 3.1)

Scientific classification
- Kingdom: Animalia
- Phylum: Chordata
- Class: Actinopterygii
- Order: Atheriniformes
- Family: Melanotaeniidae
- Genus: Glossolepis
- Species: G. pseudoincisa

Binomial name
- Glossolepis pseudoincisa G. R. Allen & N. J. Cross, 1980

Species of fish

The Tami River rainbowfish (Glossolepis pseudoincisa) is a species of rainbowfish in the subfamily Melanotaeniinae. It is found in West Papua in Indonesia. This species can reach a length of 8.0 centimetres (3.1 in) SL.

The species name, pseudoincisa, is virtually always misspelt as "pseudoincisus." The genus name, Glossolepis, is feminine and requires the feminine form of a specific taxon.
