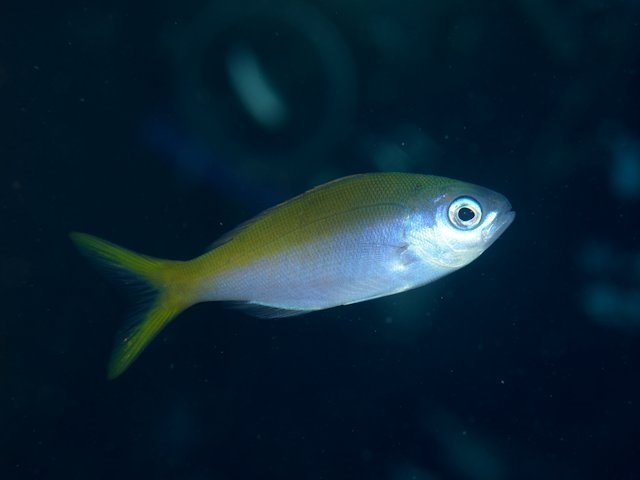
- Paracaesio xanthura

Scientific classification
- Kingdom: Animalia
- Phylum: Chordata
- Class: Actinopterygii
- Order: Acanthuriformes
- Family: Lutjanidae
- Subfamily: Apsilinae
- Genus: Paracaesio; Bleeker, 1875

Type species
- Caesio xanthurus Bleeker, 1869

Synonyms
- Aetiasis Barnard, 1937; Vegetichthys S. Tanaka (I), 1917

= Paracaesio =

Genus of ray-finned fishes

Paracaesio is a genus marine ray-finned fishes, snappers belonging to the family Lutjanidae. They are native to the Indian Ocean and the western Pacific Ocean, with these currently recognized species:

- Paracaesio brevidentata W. T. White & Last, 2012
- Paracaesio caerulea (Katayama, 1934) (Japanese snapper)
- Paracaesio gonzalesi Fourmanoir & Rivaton, 1979 (Vanuatu snapper)
- Paracaesio kusakarii T. Abe, 1960 (saddle-back snapper)
- Paracaesio paragrapsimodon W. D. Anderson & Kailola, 1992
- Paracaesio sordida T. Abe & S. Shinohara, 1962 (dirty ordure snapper)
- Paracaesio stonei U. Raj & Seeto, 1983 (cocoa snapper)
- Paracaesio waltervadi W. D. Anderson & Collette, 1992
- Paracaesio xanthura (Bleeker, 1869) (yellowtail blue snapper)
