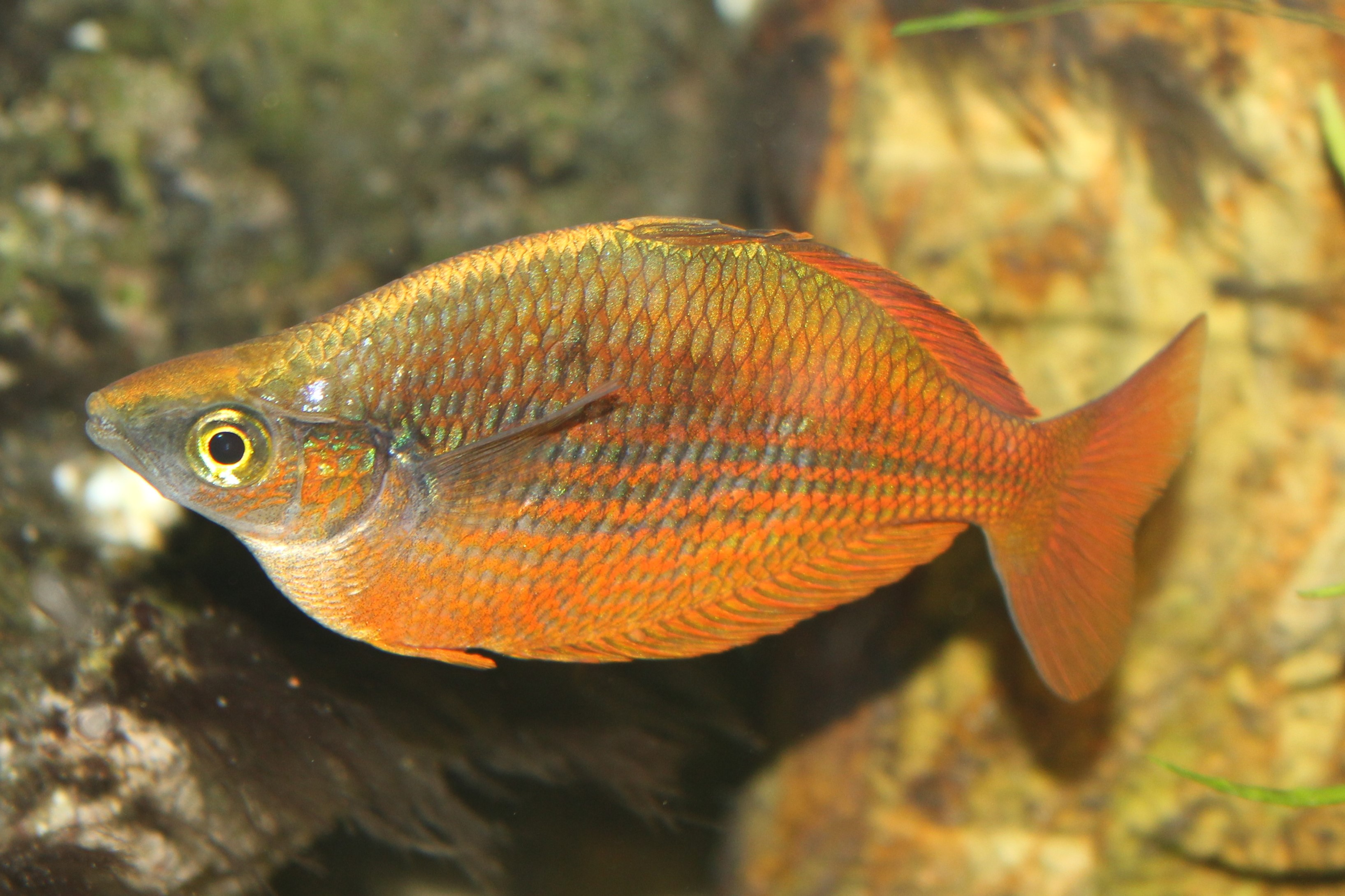
- Glossolepis incisus

Scientific classification
- Kingdom: Animalia
- Phylum: Chordata
- Class: Actinopterygii
- Order: Atheriniformes
- Family: Melanotaeniidae
- Genus: Glossolepis; M. C. W. Weber, 1907

Type species
- Glossolepis incisus Weber, 1907

= Glossolepis =

Genus of fishes

Glossolepis is a genus of rainbowfishes from New Guinea.

== Species ==
There are currently nine recognized species in this genus:

- Glossolepis dorityi G. R. Allen, 2001 (Doritys rainbowfish)
- Glossolepis incisa M. C. W. Weber, 1907 (Red rainbowfish)
- Glossolepis kabia (Herre, 1935)
- Glossolepis leggetti G. R. Allen & Renyaan, 1998 (Leggett's rainbowfish)
- Glossolepis maculosus G. R. Allen, 1981 (Spotted rainbowfish)
- Glossolepis multisquamata (M. C. W. Weber & de Beaufort, 1922) (Sepik rainbowfish)
- Glossolepis pseudoincisa G. R. Allen & N. J. Cross, 1980 (Tami River rainbowfish)
- Glossolepis ramuensis G. R. Allen, 1985 (Ramu rainbowfish)
- Glossolepis wanamensis G. R. Allen & Kailola, 1979 (Lake Wanam rainbowfish)
