= Neoarius midgleyi =

Scientific classification
- Kingdom: Animalia
- Phylum: Chordata
- Class: Actinopterygii
- Order: Siluriformes
- Family: Ariidae
- Genus: Neoarius
- Species: N. midgleyi

Binomial name
- Neoarius midgleyi (Kailola & Pierce, 1988)

Synonyms
- Arius midgleyi Kailola & Pierce, 1988; Ariopsis midgleyi (Kailola & Pierce, 1988)

Species of fish

Neoarius midgleyi, the silver cobbler, Lake Argyle catfish, Lake Argyle silver cobbler, Midgley's catfish, Ord River catfish, shovel-nosed catfish, or shovelhead catfish, is a species of catfish in the family Ariidae. It was described by Patricia J. Kailola and Bryan E. Pierce in 1988, originally under the genus Arius. It inhabits brackish and freshwaters in northern Australia. It is known to reach a maximum standard length of 140 cm (55 in), but usually reaches an SL of 50 cm (20 in).

The silver cobbler's diet includes crayfish, finfish and prawns.
