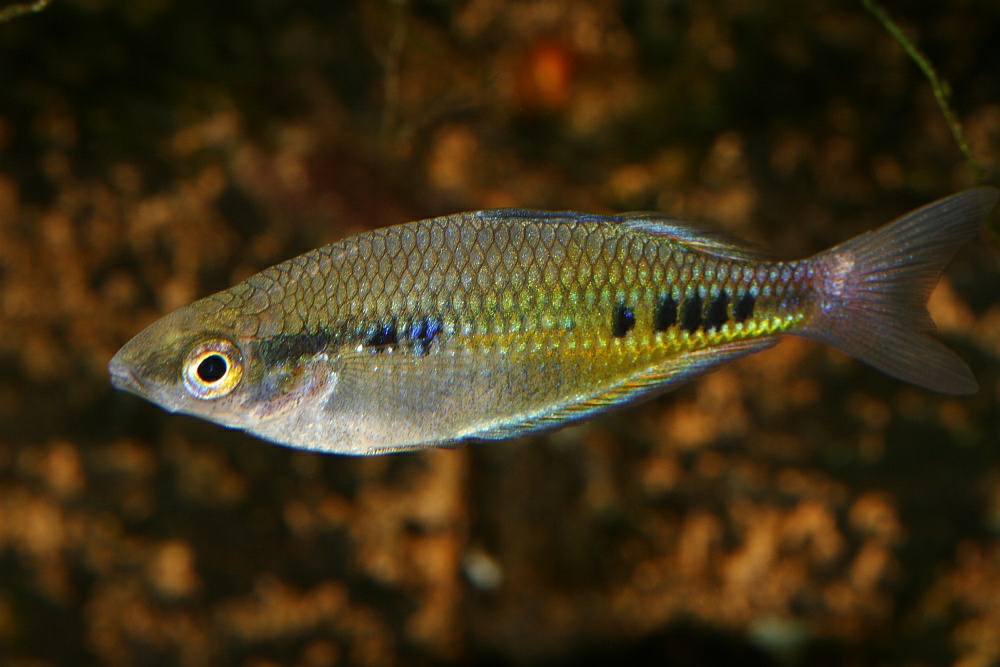

Conservation status
- Endangered (IUCN 3.1)

Scientific classification
- Kingdom: Animalia
- Phylum: Chordata
- Class: Actinopterygii
- Order: Atheriniformes
- Family: Melanotaeniidae
- Genus: Glossolepis
- Species: G. maculosus

Binomial name
- Glossolepis maculosus G. R. Allen, 1981

= Spotted rainbowfish =

Species of fish

The spotted rainbowfish (Glossolepis maculosus) is a species of rainbowfish in the subfamily Melanotaeniinae. It is endemic to the river systems of the Markham and Ramu Rivers in Papua New Guinea. Papua New Guinea. This species was described by Gerald R. Allen in 1981 with the type locality given as a small tributary of the Omsis River, about 22 kilometers west of Lae in the Markham River system, Papua New Guinea.
