= Scalemouth jobfish =

Conservation status
- Least Concern (IUCN 3.1)

Scientific classification
- Kingdom: Animalia
- Phylum: Chordata
- Class: Actinopterygii
- Order: Acanthuriformes
- Family: Lutjanidae
- Subfamily: Apsilinae
- Genus: Parapristipomoides; Kami, 1973
- Species: P. squamimaxillaris

Binomial name
- Parapristipomoides squamimaxillaris (Kami, 1973)

Synonyms
- Pristipomoides squamimaxillaris Kami, 1973

Species of fish

The scalemouth jobfish (Parapristipomoides squamimaxillaris), also known as the scalemouth snapper, is a species of marine ray-finned fish, a snapper belonging to the family Lutjanidae. It is native to the Pacific Ocean. This species is the only known member of its genus.

== Description ==
The scalemouth jobfish has an elongated, slender body which at its deepest point is around a third in depth as its standard length. It has a comparatively small, sharply pointed head with a convex intraorbital area. The lower jaw protrudes slightly and the mouth reaches the pupil. The maxilla are scaled, each jaw has a single, thin band of bristle-like teeth and there is a small oval-shaped parch of teeth on the vomer. The dorsal fin has 10 spines and 10 soft rays while the anal fin has 3 spines and 8 soft rays. This species attains a maximum length of 51.4 cm (20.2 in). The main colour is a silvery pink, darker on the back. The fins are whitish, except for the caudal fin which has a yellow upper lobe and a pinkish lower lobe.

== Distribution ==
The scalemouth jobfish has a scattered distribution in the southern Pacific Ocean with records from Easter Island, Rapa Iti, New Caledonia and Tonga.

== Habitat and biology ==
The scalemouth jobfish is found in relatively deep water between 130 and 460 m (430 and 1,510 ft), at least. It is associated with rocky substrates, particularly reefs.

== Systematics and etymology ==
The scalemouth jobfish was first formally described in 1973 as Pristipomoides squamimaxillaris by the American zoologist Harry T. Kami with the type locality given as Easter Island. Kami placed this species in the monotypic subgenus Parapristipomoide but later workers argued that it was too different from other species in that genus and made Parapristipomoides a valid genus. The generic name means "near to Pristipomoides" while the specific name squamimaxillaris means "scaly jaw", a reference to the scaled jaws of this species.

== Utilisation ==
The scalemouth jobfish is caught by handline fishing at Easter Island and Rapa Iti and the catch is sold fresh.
