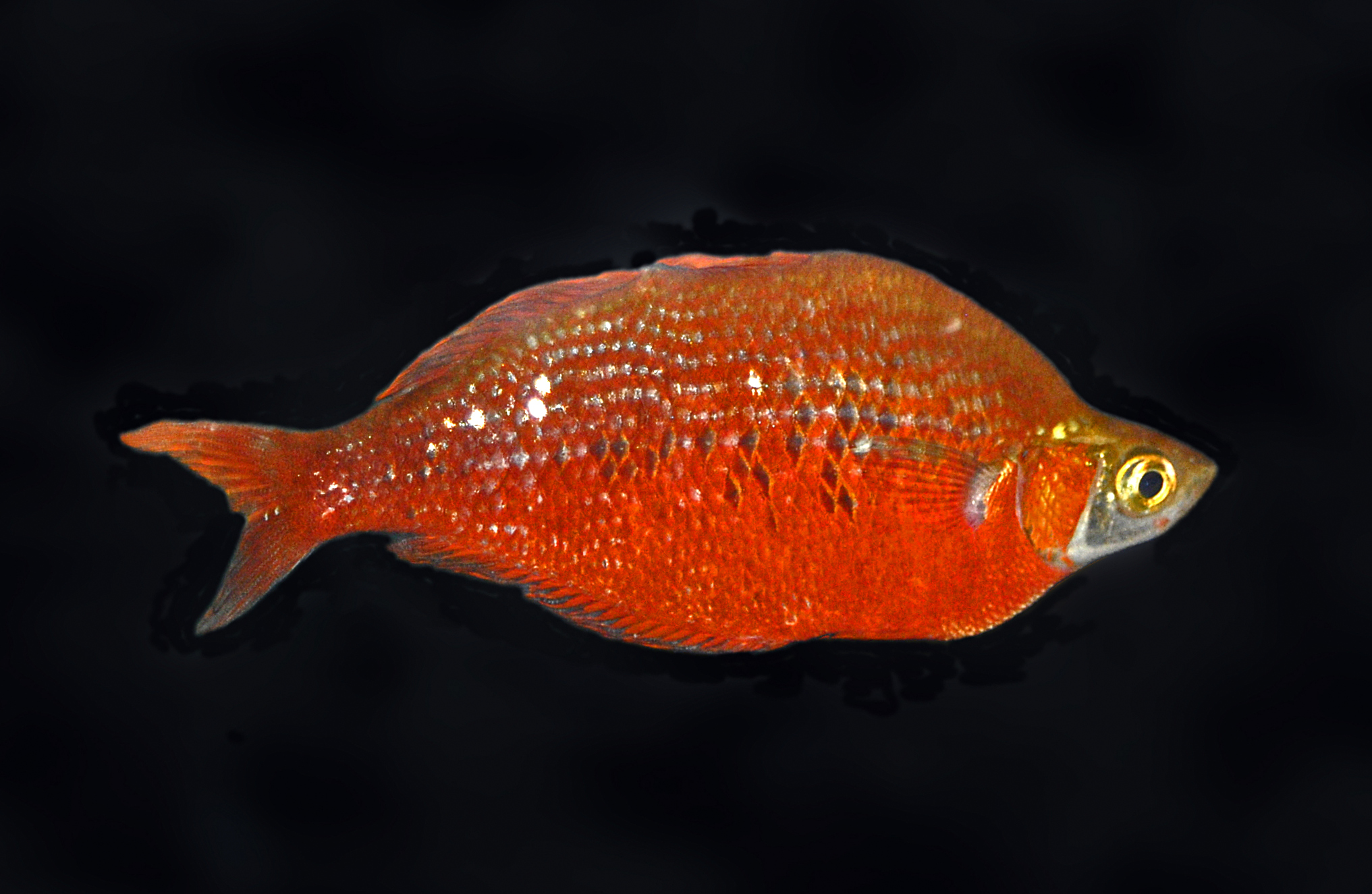
- male

Conservation status
- Endangered (IUCN 3.1)

Scientific classification
- Kingdom: Animalia
- Phylum: Chordata
- Class: Actinopterygii
- Order: Atheriniformes
- Family: Melanotaeniidae
- Genus: Glossolepis
- Species: G. incisa

Binomial name
- Glossolepis incisa M. C. W. Weber, 1907

= Red rainbowfish =

Species of rainbowfish

The red rainbowfish or salmon-red rainbowfish (Glossolepis incisa) is a species of rainbowfish from Lake Sentani in Irian Jaya, Indonesia. Belonging to the family Melanotaeniidae, in the subfamily Melanotaeniinae, the Australian rainbowfishes. It is threatened in its native range, but easily bred in captivity and common in the aquarium trade.

== Description ==
Female red rainbowfish

The males are bright red and with age grow a high back. The females are olive brown in colour. Their colours change depending on their mood, but subordinate males do not display bright colours. They grow up to 15 cm (5.9 in) in size, but typically attain a smaller size of around 12 cm (4.7 in).

== Breeding ==
They are an egg scattering species and they scatter their eggs among clumps of vegetation. The eggs take about 7 days to hatch.

== Nutrition ==
Glossolepis incisus is an omnivore and in captivity it will eat most common commercial aquarium foods readily. It may be slightly more carnivorous than most of the Australian rainbowfish.

== Conservation status ==
The IUCN Red List classifies Glossolepis incisa as endangered. This is because of the rapidly increasing human population around this fish's only natural habitat and introduced species such as tilapia.

== Distribution ==
This species is endemic to Lake Sentani and its tributaries near Jayapura in Papua, Indonesia (a range it shares with the related Chilatherina sentaniensis).

== Taxonomy ==
Glossolepis incisa is the type species of the genus Glossolepis and was described by Max C.W. Weber in 1907. The name is virtually always misspelt as "incisus." However, the genus name (Glossolepis) is feminine, and the specific taxon must follow form.
