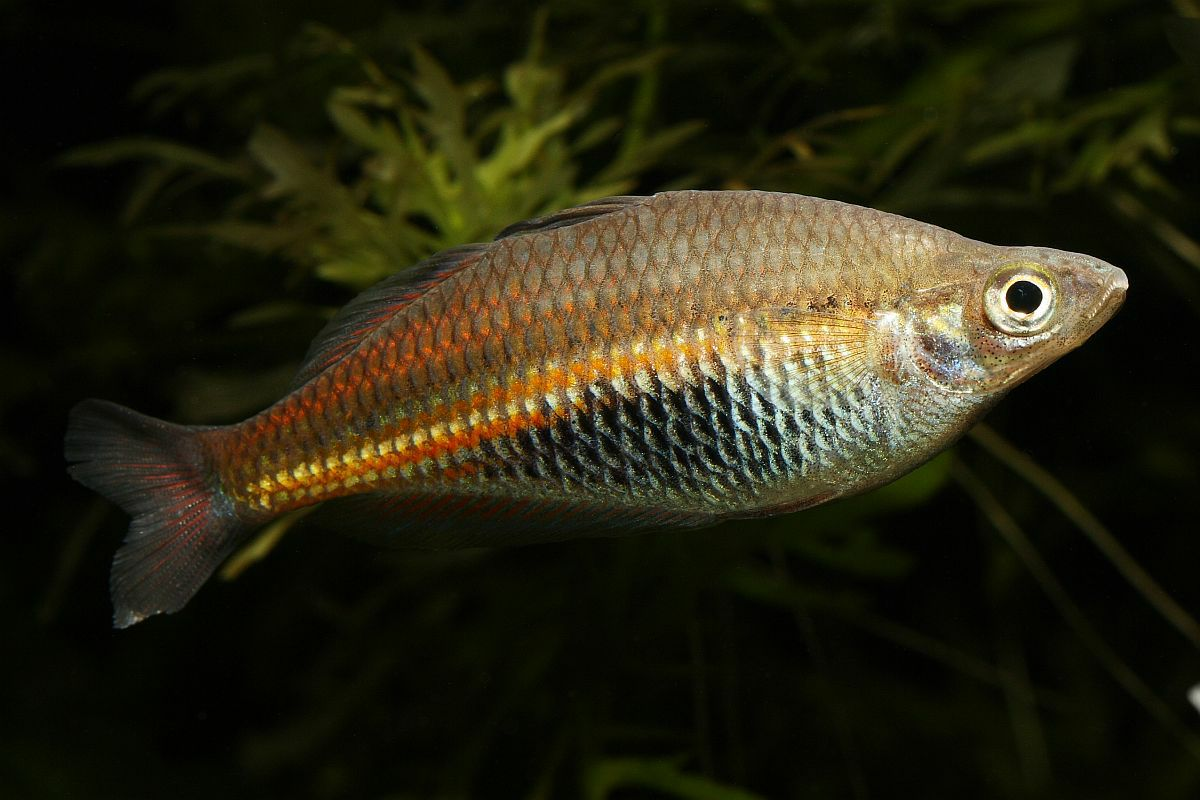

Conservation status
- Vulnerable (IUCN 3.1)

Scientific classification
- Kingdom: Animalia
- Phylum: Chordata
- Class: Actinopterygii
- Order: Atheriniformes
- Family: Melanotaeniidae
- Genus: Glossolepis
- Species: G. ramuensis

Binomial name
- Glossolepis ramuensis G. R. Allen, 1985

= Ramu rainbowfish =

Species of fish

The Ramu rainbowfish (Glossolepis ramuensis) is a species of fish in the family Melanotaeniidae. It is endemic to Papua New Guinea where it occurs in tributary streams of the Gogol River near Madang, but it has also been recorded from the middle Ramu basin. This species was described by Gerald R. Allen in n1985 and the type locality is given as "tributary of Ramu River about 3 kilometers south of Walium Village".
