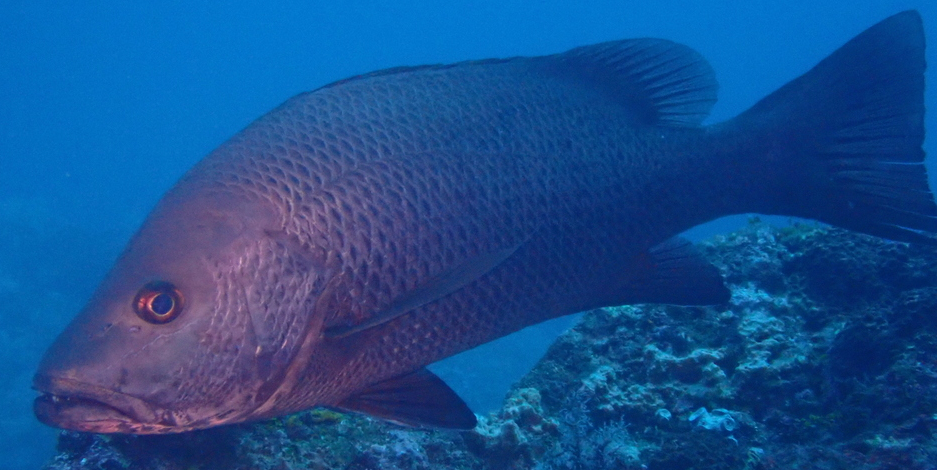
- Lutjanus argentimaculatus off Southern Taiwan

Conservation status
- Least Concern (IUCN 3.1)

Scientific classification
- Kingdom: Animalia
- Phylum: Chordata
- Class: Actinopterygii
- Order: Acanthuriformes
- Family: Lutjanidae
- Genus: Lutjanus
- Species: L. argentimaculatus

Binomial name
- Lutjanus argentimaculatus (Forsskål, 1775)

Synonyms
- Sciaena argentimaculata Forsskål, 1775; Sciaena argentata J. F. Gmelin, 1789; Alphestes gembra Bloch & J. G. Schneider, 1801; Alphestes sambra Bloch & J. G. Schneider, 1801; Perca argentata Bloch & J. G. Schneider, 1801; Mesoprion flavipinnis G. Cuvier, 1828; Mesoprion olivaceus G. Cuvier, 1828; Mesoprion taeniops Valenciennes, 1830; Mesoprion griseoides Guichenot, 1863; Mesoprion garretti Günther, 1873; Lutianus jahngarah F. Day, 1875; Diacopus superbus Castelnau, 1878; Diacope superba Castelnau, 1878; Mesoprion obscurus W. J. Macleay, 1881; Mesoprion roseigaster W. J. Macleay, 1881; Mesoprion sexfasciatus W. J. Macleay, 1883; Lutianus salmonoides Gilchrist & W. W. Thompson, 1908

= Mangrove red snapper =

Species of fish

The mangrove red snapper (Lutjanus argentimaculatus), also known as mangrove jack, grey snapper, creek red bream, Stuart evader, dog bream, purple sea perch, red bream, red perch, red reef bream, river roman, or rock barramundi (though it is not closely related to bream, jack, or barramundi), is a species of marine ray-finned fish, a snapper belonging to the family Lutjanidae. It has a wide Indo-Pacific range and has recently been recorded in the eastern Mediterranean Sea.

== Taxonomy ==
The mangrove red snapper was first formally described in 1775 as Sciaena argentimaculata by the Swedish speaking Finnish-born explorer and naturalist Peter Forsskål with the type locality given as the Red Sea. The specific name is a compound of argentum meaning "silver" and maculatus meaning "spots", a possible reference to the white edging to each of the scales on this species.

== Description ==
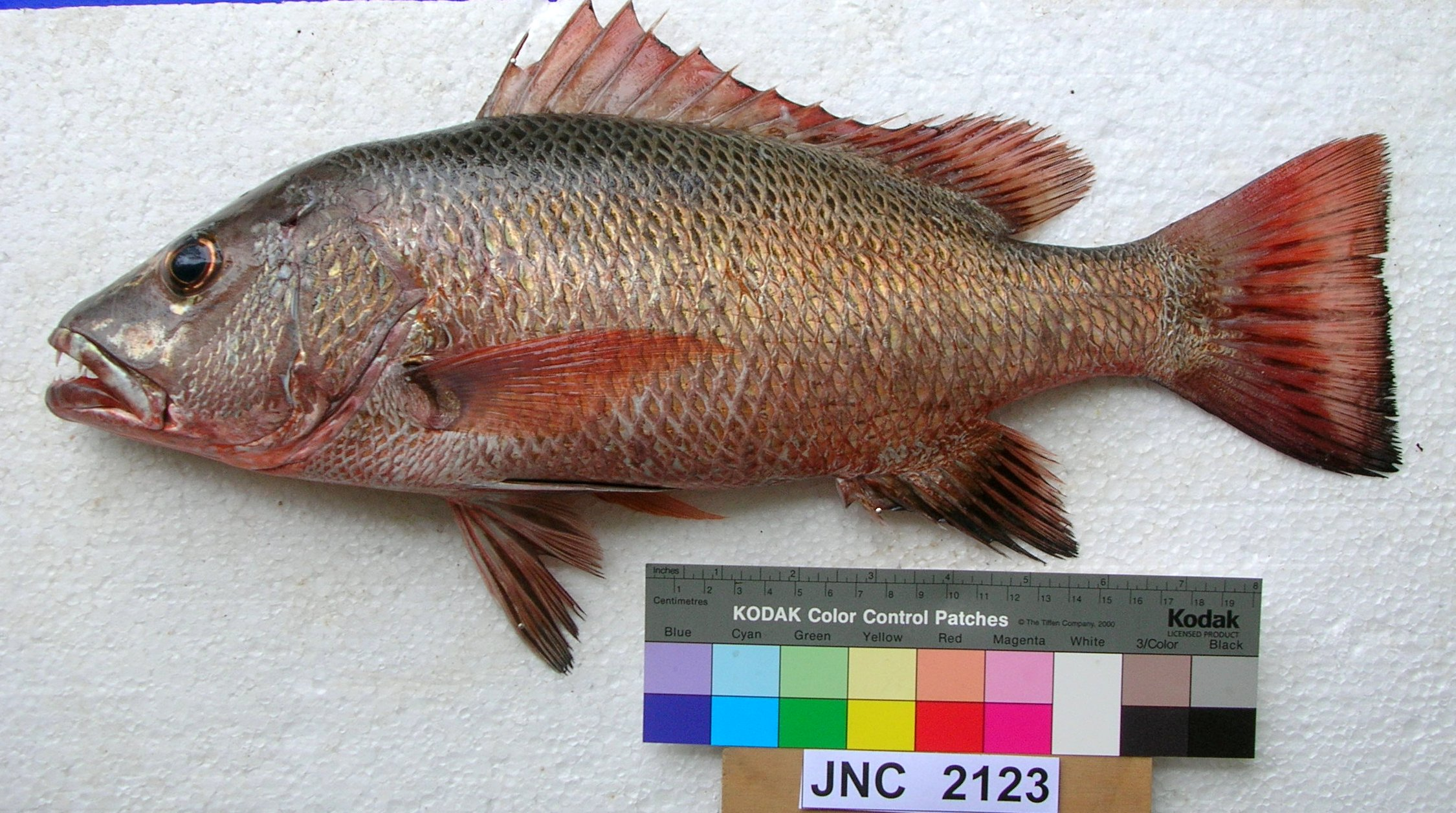
A 44.5 centimetres (17.5 in) FL, 1,200 grams (2.6 lb), New Caledonian mangrove jack

Coloration of the mangrove red snapper ranges from burnt orange, to copper, to bronze and dark reddish-brown, depending on its age and environment. Younger fish caught in estuarine areas are often darker than older fish taken from offshore reef areas, and exhibit lighter vertical bands down their flanks. The maximum recorded length is 150 centimetres (4.9 ft), but 80 centimetres (2.6 ft) is most common. Like other tropical snappers (family Lutjanidae), mangrove jacks have prominent fangs in their jaws that are used for seizing and holding prey, akin to the canine teeth of a mammal. These teeth can cause a nasty injury to unwary fishers.

In reef areas, mangrove red snappers are sometimes confused with two-spot red snapper or red bass (Lutjanus bohar), a known carrier of ciguatera toxin. The red bass, however, is usually darker in coloration, has fewer dorsal-fin spines, scale rows on the back that rise obliquely from the lateral line, and a deep groove from the nostrils to the eyes.

== Distribution and habitat ==
The mangrove red snapper is native to the Indian Ocean and the western Pacific Ocean from the African coast to Samoa and the Line Islands and from the Ryukyus in the north to Australia in the south. It has also rarely been recorded in the Mediterranean Sea, having undergone Lessepsian migration from the Red Sea since at least 1979.

As its name implies, the mangrove red snapper is commonly found in mangrove-lined estuarine systems, however some make their way into complete freshwater systems, particularly at a juvenile age. They migrate to offshore reefs to spawn. As they mature, mangrove red snappers move into open waters, sometimes hundreds of kilometers from the coast to breed. These larger fish are sometimes caught by bottom-fishers with heavy tackle, though they remain difficult to land due to their speed and proximity to sharp reef bottoms.

== Biology ==
=== Diet ===
The species is carnivorous; they are predators, feeding mainly at night on fish, crustaceans, gastropods, and cephalopods. As ambush predators, they often dwell around mangrove roots, fallen trees, rock walls, and any other snag areas where smaller prey reside for protection.

=== Reproduction ===
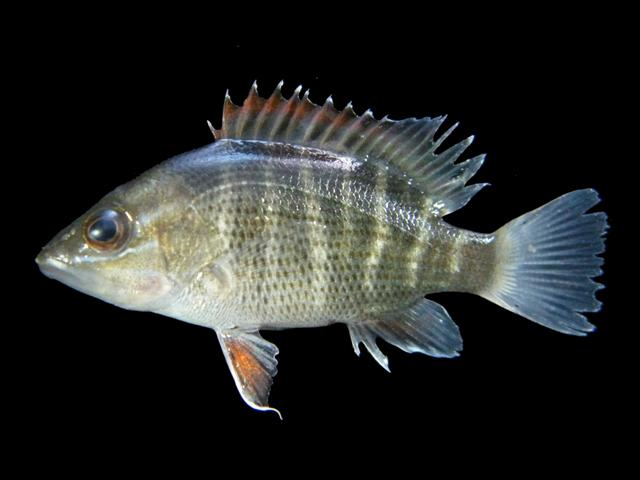
Juvenile mangrove red snapper, Kampuan mangrove forest, Thailand

Like many marine fish, the mangrove red snapper is a broadcast spawner. Spawning occurs during the austral spring-summer seasons in Northeastern Queensland, "[beginning] around October, peaked in December and then declined over summer from January through March."[sic]; conversely, it occurs during boreal autumn in Thailand from late September to November. Both of these periods coincide with high rainfall and decreasing water temperature, which may result in nutrients being flushed into inshore waters from alluvial runoff. Due to the continuing presence of juveniles in March and April, Thai mangrove jacks may continue spawning during the boreal springtime. Mangrove jacks in Palau were observed to form spawning aggregations in reef lagoons and outer reef slopes. Spawning is influenced by the lunar cycles - akin to a number of other lutjanids - peaking between days 14 and 18 of the lunar month, or around the full moon; this appears to be a method to give the subsequent eggs and larvae the most advantageous tides for survival.

A 4.6 kilograms (10 lb) female may produce 1.3 million eggs, which are transparent, pelagic, and do not adhere to substrate (e.g non-adhesive). The eggs started undergoing mitosis 1.5 hours after spawning, the embryo formed 12 hours hence, and they hatched after 16 hours of development at 28 °C (82 °F) and 32 ppt salinity. 72 hours after hatching, yolk resorption is complete, and the larvae begin feeding. The growth of the larvae is slow in the first week of life, but greatly accelerates in the subsequent two weeks. Immature fish are found in inshore areas, including rivers, while mature fish tend to be caught offshore. Males matured at somewhat smaller sizes than the females: Lm_{50} (length where 50% of fish sampled were mature) for females was 531.4 mm FL, while for male fish it was 470.7 mm FL. The maximum reported age is 31 years.

== Fisheries ==
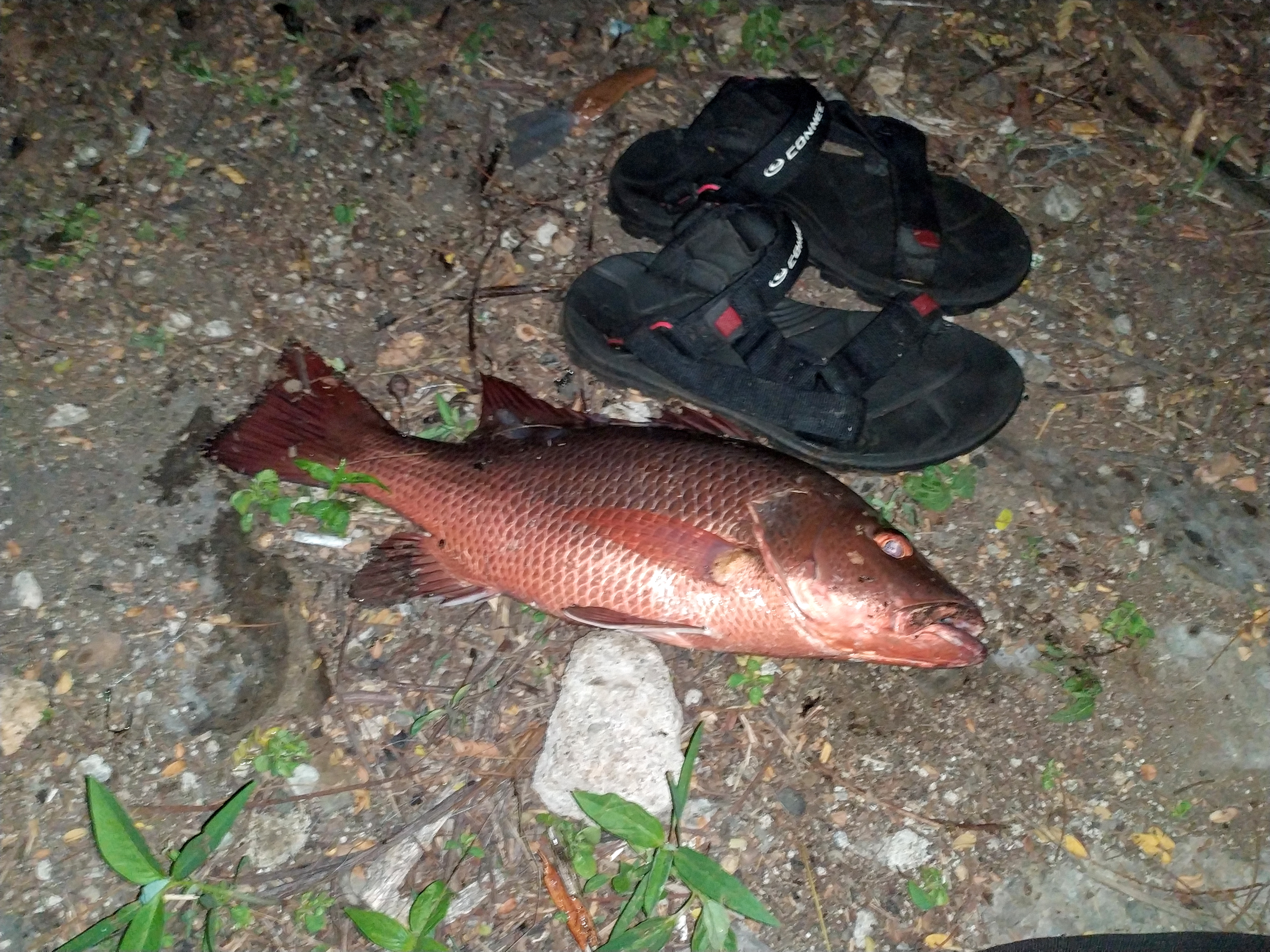
Mangrove red snapper, about 3 lb

Capture (blue) and aquaculture (green) production of Mangrove red snapper (Lutjanus argentimaculatus) in thousand tonnes from 1950 to 2022, as reported by the FAO

Mangrove red snapper is a popular and important commercial and recreational fish throughout its range, and considered to be an excellent food fish, which allows it to command a relatively high market price.

For fishermen, the telltale sign of a hooked mangrove red snapper is the explosive run for cover once the bait (or lure) is taken. Many fish (and so lures) are lost once they reach the protection of the snags as a result of their initial burst of speed.

In Southeast Asia, these fish are aquacultured; the fry are collected from the wild, and reared to market size in brackish-water floating net cages and ponds. During the turn of the new millennium, efforts were made to improve production of aquacultured mangrove jacks, and the reproductive mechanisms of the fish were discovered, along with effective methods for induced spawning through hormonal injection.

The mangrove red snapper is a highly regarded table fish with firm, sweet-tasting, white flesh. While often a nuisance species when targeting the infamous barramundi, many fisherman rate the eating qualities of the jack higher than it.
