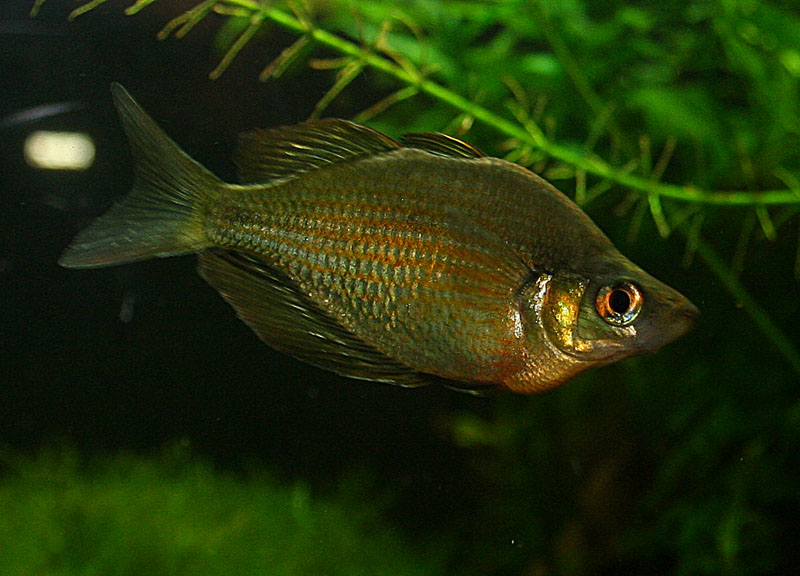

Conservation status
- Critically Endangered (IUCN 3.1)

Scientific classification
- Kingdom: Animalia
- Phylum: Chordata
- Class: Actinopterygii
- Order: Atheriniformes
- Family: Melanotaeniidae
- Genus: Glossolepis
- Species: G. wanamensis

Binomial name
- Glossolepis wanamensis G. R. Allen & Kailola, 1979

= Lake Wanam rainbowfish =

Species of fish

The Lake Wanam rainbowfish (Glossolepis wanamensis) is a critically endangered species of rainbowfish in the subfamily Melanotaeniinae. It is endemic to Lake Wanam near Lae in Papua New Guinea. It has virtually disappeared from the small lake (2–3 km in diameter) due to competition from introduced, non-native tilapias, but captive populations exist.

== Sources ==
- Ryan Junghenn Aquarium Fish Experts
