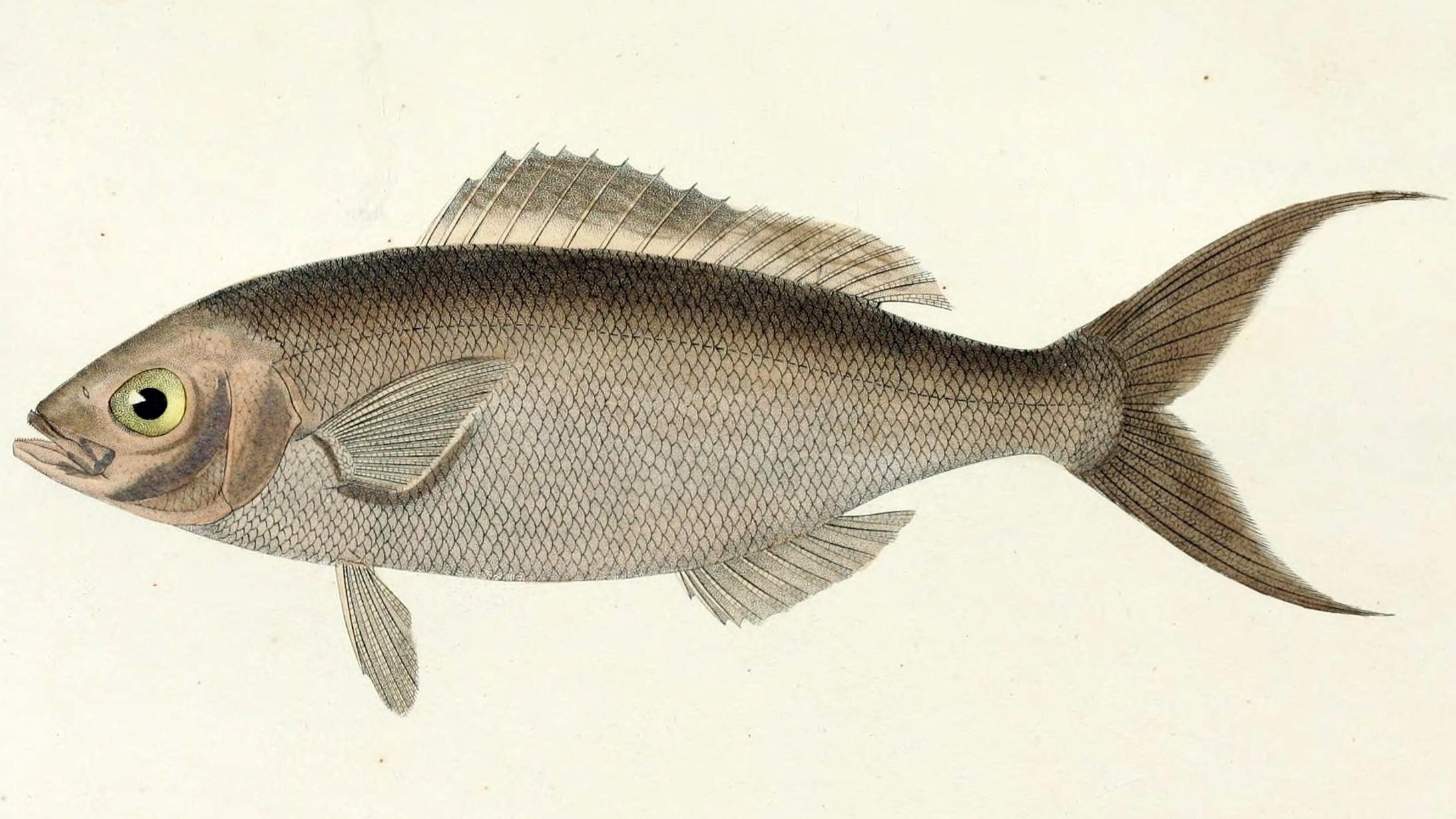

Conservation status
- Least Concern (IUCN 3.1)

Scientific classification
- Kingdom: Animalia
- Phylum: Chordata
- Class: Actinopterygii
- Order: Acanthuriformes
- Family: Lutjanidae
- Genus: Apsilus
- Species: A. fuscus

Binomial name
- Apsilus fuscus Valenciennes, 1830

= African forktail snapper =

Species of fish

The African forktail snapper (Apsilus fuscus), is a species of marine ray-finned fish, a snapper belonging to the family Lutjanidae. It is found in the eastern Atlantic Ocean.

== Description ==
The African forktail snapper has a moderately elongated fusiform body with a mouth which reaches level with the anterior part of the eye. All of the teeth are bristle-like and the vomerine teeth form a v shaped patch. The space between the eyes is wide and convex in profile. The caudal fin is forked. The dorsal fin contains 10 spines and 10 soft rays while the anal fin has 3 spines and 8 soft rays. The upper body and flanks are dark brown, lighter on abdomen and cin and throat. This species attains a maximum total length of 75 cm (30 in), although 60 cm (24 in) is more typical.

== Distribution ==
The African forktail snapper is found in the eastern Atlantic Ocean where it is found along the western coast of Africa from Mauritania to Namibia, including the Cape Verde Islands. It is rare in the northern part of its range and is very uncommonly caught off Senegal. There are claims of this species from the Indian Ocean but these are considered to be misidentifications.

== Habitat and biology ==
The African forktail snapper is found at depths between 15 and 300 m (49 and 984 ft), although it is typically encountered at depths in excess of 50 m (160 ft). It is found over substrates consisting of rock or coral, frequently on reefs. It is found with either singly or in small aggregations. It is a predator with a diet made up of small fishes, crustaceans and cephalopods. It has been reported from estuaries in Nigeria and gatherings in relatively shallow waters, less than 40 m (130 ft), off Ghana may be associated with seasonal upwellings.

== Systematics and etymology ==
The African forktail snapper was first formally described in 1830 by the French zoologist Achille Valenciennes with the type locality given as Porto Praya in the Cape Verde Islands. When Valenciennes described this species, it was the only one in the genus Apsilus, meaning that it was the type species of that genus by monotypy. The specific name fuscus means "dark", "dusky" or "swarthy" and refers to the brown colouration of this fish.

== Utilisation ==
The African forktail is regarded as being of potential interest to fisheries as it has good quality flesh. It is caught using handlines, set nets and bottom trawls and the catch is sold fresh. It is caught as a bycatch by commercial octopus fisheries.
