= Glossolepis leggetti =

Conservation status
- Least Concern (IUCN 3.1)

Scientific classification
- Kingdom: Animalia
- Phylum: Chordata
- Class: Actinopterygii
- Order: Atheriniformes
- Family: Melanotaeniidae
- Genus: Glossolepis
- Species: G. leggetti

Binomial name
- Glossolepis leggetti G. R. Allen & Renyaan, 1998

Species of fish

Glossolepis leggetti, also known as Leggett's rainbowfish, is a species of rainbowfish in the subfamily Melanotaeniinae. It is only found in the Wapoga River system of northern Irian Jaya, Indonesia.

== Description ==
Glossolepis leggetti can reach a standard length of 9.3 centimetres (3.7 in).

== Etymology ==
This species is named in honour of Australian aquarist-naturalist Ray Leggett (b. 1936), in recognition of his contributions to further the knowledge of freshwater fishes in the New Guinea-Australia region.
