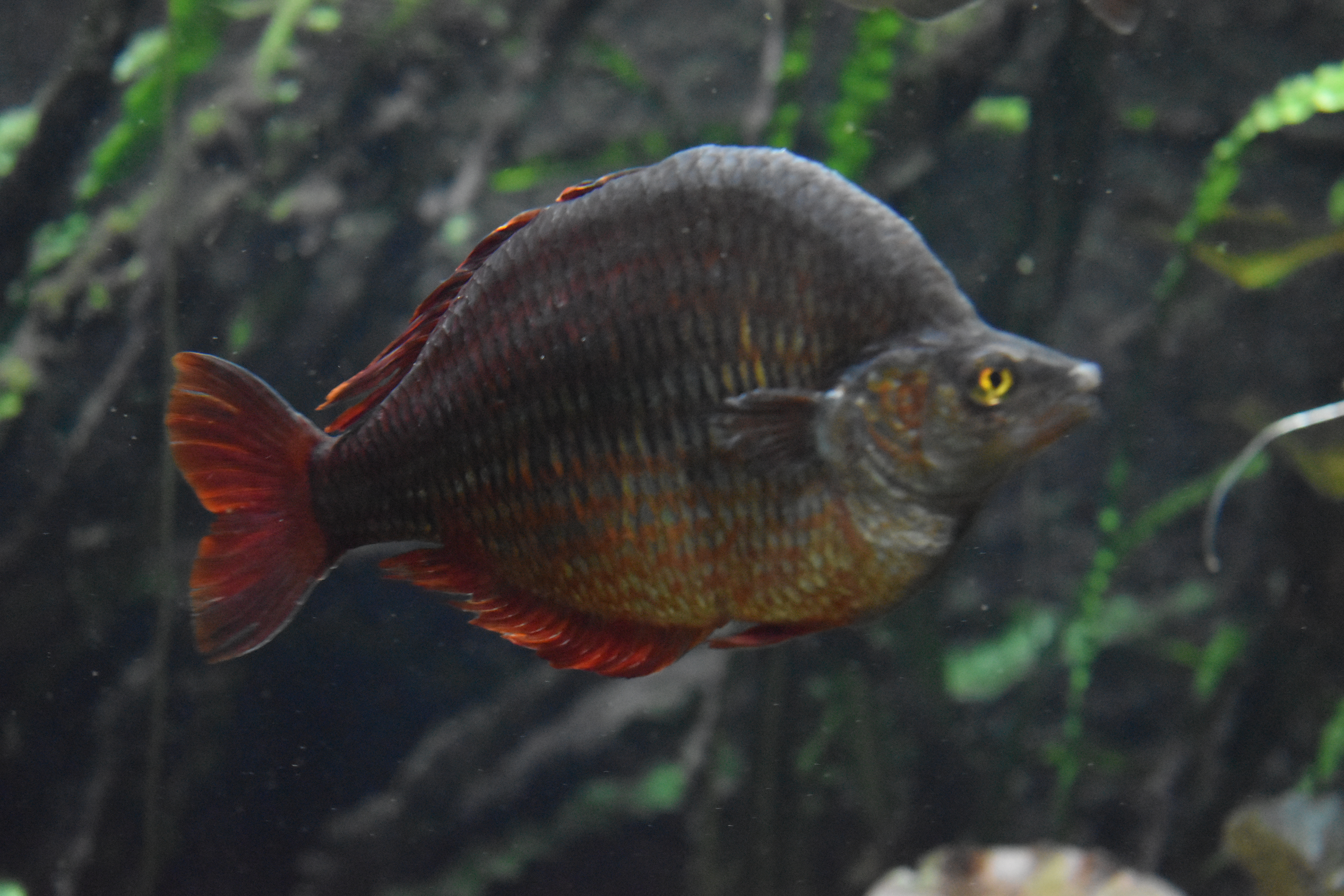
- Grime rainbowfish (Glossolepis dorityi) at London Zoo

Conservation status
- Critically endangered, possibly extinct in the wild (IUCN 3.1)

Scientific classification
- Kingdom: Animalia
- Phylum: Chordata
- Class: Actinopterygii
- Order: Atheriniformes
- Family: Melanotaeniidae
- Genus: Glossolepis
- Species: G. dorityi

Binomial name
- Glossolepis dorityi G. R. Allen, 2001

= Glossolepis dorityi =

Grime rainbowfish

Species of rainbowfish

Glossolepis dorityi, the Grime rainbowfish, is a species of rainbowfish native to the Grime River region in northern West Papua.

== Distribution and habitat ==
The species is known only from two lakes in the Grime river system. It was last caught in 2008, and may now be extinct in the wild, due to the threat of aquaculture and competition with non-native species of tilapia and carp. Captive bred individuals can be found in the aquarium trade, however.

The locality in which the species is found is a floodplain, covered with small round lakes. The fish are more abundant where the aquatic vegetation is dense. There has been extensive habitat modification due to an expanding human population.

== Description ==
Individuals of Glossolepis dorityi are greenish, with orange stripes between regular rows of large scales. The stripes are especially prominent during courtship. Males have deeper bodies, and females lack the stripes between scale rows. The species can grow up to 11.5 centimetres (4.5 in) in length.

== Biology and behaviour ==
The species is schooling, and feeds on various plants and insects. During breeding, pairs of fish come together on the riverbed. After the young hatch, they are abandoned. The juvenile fish are 4mm long, and feed on microscopic inveterbrates and plants until they mature.
