= Tang's snapper =

Conservation status
- Least Concern (IUCN 3.1)

Scientific classification
- Kingdom: Animalia
- Phylum: Chordata
- Class: Actinopterygii
- Order: Acanthuriformes
- Family: Lutjanidae
- Subfamily: Apsilinae
- Genus: Lipocheilus; W. D. Anderson, Talwar & G. D. Johnson, 1977
- Species: L. carnolabrum

Binomial name
- Lipocheilus carnolabrum (W. L. Y. Chan, 1970)

Synonyms
- For genus: Tangia W. L. Y. Chan, 1970 (pre-occupied in Hemiptera); For species: Tangia carnolabrum W. L. Y. Chan, 1970

Species of fish

Tang's snapper (Lipocheilus carnolabrum) is a species of marine ray-finned fish, a snapper belonging to the family Lutjanidae. It is native to the Indian Ocean and the western Pacific Ocean. They inhabit areas of the continental shelf with rocky substrates at depths from 90 to 340 m (300 to 1,120 ft). This species grows to 60 cm (24 in) in total length. It is a commercially important species as a food fish. This species is the only known member of its genus.

== Description ==
Tang's snapper has a body which is around 40% as deep as its standard length. It has a large mouth, the upper jaw protruded when the mouth is closed, with the adults having a thick, fleshy knob on the front of the upper lip The space between the eyes can either be flat or convex. There are palatine and vomerine teeth, with the vomerine teeth being arranged in a V-shaped patch. The caudal fin has a moderate fork. The dorsal fin contains 10 spines and 10 soft rays, the anal fin has 3 spines and 8 soft rays and there are no scales on either of these fins. The rearmost soft rays in the dorsal and anal fins not produced. The pectoral fins are long and they extend to past the anus. The upper part of the head and body are brown with yellowish or pinkish flanks and a silvery sheen on the underside. This species grows to 60 cm (24 in) in total length.

== Distribution ==
Tang's snapper has a wide Indo-West Pacific distribution. Despite this wide range it has been recorded from only a few localities. These include the Ryukyu Islands, the South China Sea, the Andaman Sea, and the northwestern section of the Arabian Sea. It has also been recorded from the Lakshadweep Islands and Sri Lanka, Vanuatu, northern Australia, Papua New Guinea and the Solomon Islands.

== Habitat and biology ==
Tang's snapper is a demersal species which occurs over rocky bottoms and rocky reefs on the continental shelf at depths between 90 and 340 m (300 and 1,120 ft). It is probably a predator of fishes and larger invertebrates. It is characteristic component of the assemblage of fish species occurring at depths of more than 200 m (660 ft) in offshore waters.

== Systematics and etymology ==
Tang's snapper was first formally described in 1970 as Tangia carnolabrum by Chan William Lai-Yee with the type locality given as being in the South China Sea, about 145 km (90 mi) to the southeast of Hong Kong at a depth of 110 to 130 m (360 to 430 ft). The genus name, Tangia, was preoccupied by a genus of leafhoppers in the family Tropiduchidae, so in 1977 the new genus name Lipocheilus was coined by William D. Anderson Jr., Purnesh Kumar Talwar and G. David Johnson, the novel name being a compound of lipos meaning 'fat' and cheilos meaning 'lip', a reference to the fleshy knob on the upper lip; the specific name carnolabrum means 'fleshy lips' for a similar reason. It is the only member of its genus.

== Utilisation ==
Tang's snapper is a target species for of long-line fisheries, especially on the continental shelf off southern China while in Papua New Guinea, this species is commercially important despite not being directly targeted by fisheries. It was formerly caught as bycatch in the Western Deepwater Trawl Fishery in Australia, however as of 2016 this was not an active fishery. It is caught using handlines, longlines and bottom trawls.
