= Sciades paucus =

Scientific classification
- Domain: Eukaryota
- Kingdom: Animalia
- Phylum: Chordata
- Class: Actinopterygii
- Order: Siluriformes
- Family: Ariidae
- Genus: Sciades
- Species: S. paucus

Binomial name
- Sciades paucus (Kailola, 2000)

Synonyms
- Arius paucus Kailola, 2000; Ariopsis paucus (Kailola, 2000); Neoarius paucus (Kailola, 2000)

Species of fish

Sciades paucus is a species of catfish in the family Ariidae. It was described by Patricia J. Kailola in 2000, originally under the genus Arius. It inhabits freshwaters in Australia. It reaches a maximum total length of 130 cm (51 in), and a maximum weight of 2.8 kg (6.2 lb).

The species epithet "paucus" is derived from the Latin term for "less", and refers to the species bearing fewer gill rakers than those of Neoarius midgleyi (referred to as "Arius midgleyi").
