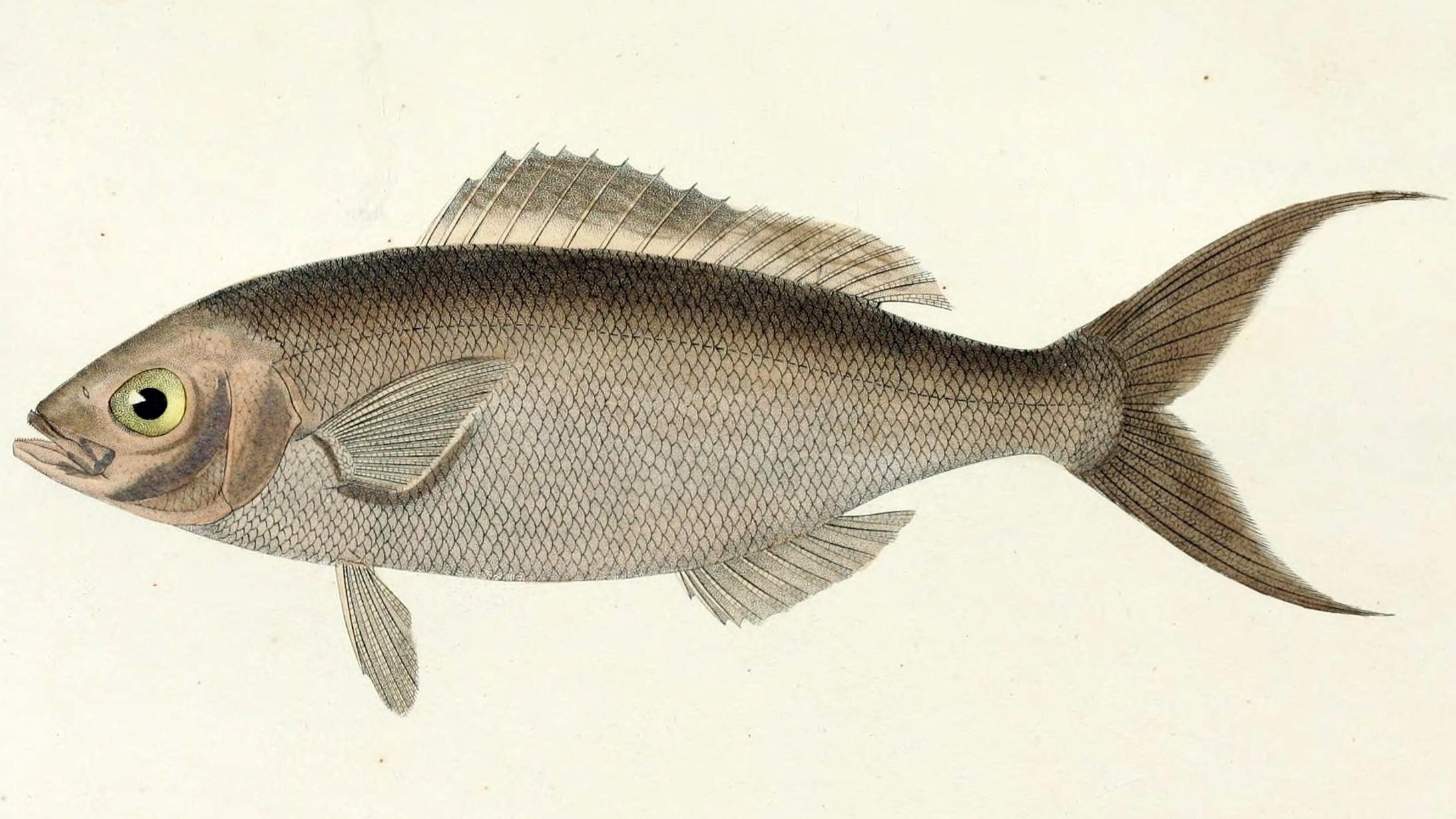
- Apsilus fuscus

Scientific classification
- Kingdom: Animalia
- Phylum: Chordata
- Class: Actinopterygii
- Order: Acanthuriformes
- Family: Lutjanidae
- Subfamily: Apsilinae
- Genus: Apsilus; Valenciennes, 1830

Type species
- Apsilus fuscus Valenciennes, 1830

Synonyms
- Tropidinius Poey 1868

= Apsilus =

Genus of fishes

Apsilus is a small genus of marine ray-finned fish, snappers belonging to the family Lutjanidae. The two species within the genus are native to the Atlantic Ocean,

== Characteristics ==
The two species within the genus Apsilus are medium-sized snappers with fusiform bodies, the body can be slender or relatively deep but these are robust fishes. The jaws are equipped with moderately sized teeth which are conical or bristle shaped and which are arranged in bands with the outer row enlarged. They have a continuous dorsal fin which is not notched where the spiny and soft-rayed parts meet. The dorsal fin has 10 spines and 9 or 10 soft rays while the anal fin has 3 spines and 8 soft rays. The dorsal and anal fins are lacking in scales while the caudal fin is scaled, the caudal fin may be forked or emarginate.

== Distribution ==
Apsilus fishes are found in the Atlantic Ocean, the African forktail snapper has been reported from the Indian Ocean but these reports are questionable.

== Habitat and biology ==
Apsilus snappers inhabit waters with depths between 30 and 300 m (98 and 984 ft), typically over rocky substrates. They may be encountered as solitary fish or in aggregations and they feed on small fish, squid, benthic crustaceans and more sizeable zooplankton.

== Species ==
The following currently recognized species make up the genus Apsilus:

- Apsilus dentatus Guichenot, 1853 (black snapper)
- Apsilus fuscus Valenciennes, 1830 (African forktail snapper)

== Systematics and etymology ==
Apsilus was created in 1830 when the French zoologist Achille Valenciennes described A. fuscus from the Cape Verde Islands. In 1980 when G. David Johnson designated the subfamily Apsilinae within the Lutjanidae he used Apsilus as its type genus.

Apsilusis formed the word a meaning "not" and psilos meaning naked or bald, Valenciennes did not explain what this name alludes to but these fishes have scales on the caudal fin, but none of the other fins are scaled.
