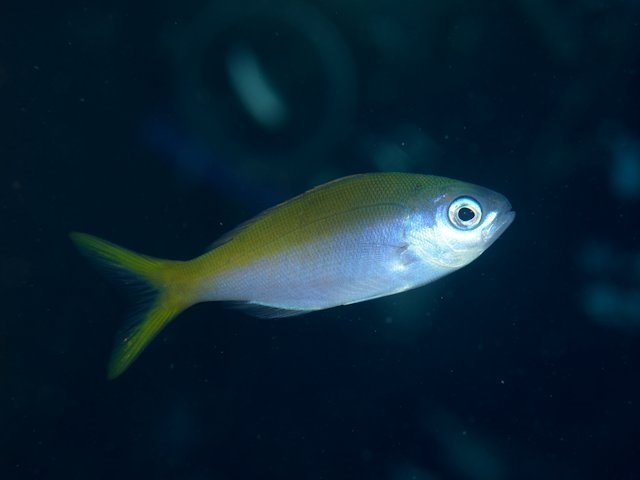

Conservation status
- Least Concern (IUCN 3.1)

Scientific classification
- Kingdom: Animalia
- Phylum: Chordata
- Class: Actinopterygii
- Order: Acanthuriformes
- Family: Lutjanidae
- Genus: Paracaesio
- Species: P. xanthura

Binomial name
- Paracaesio xanthura (Bleeker, 1869)

Synonyms
- Caesio xanthurus Bleeker, 1869; Apsilus xanthurus (Bleeker, 1869); Paracaesio pedleyi McCulloch & Waite, 1916; Vegetichthys tumidus Tanaka, 1917; Aetiasis cantharoides Barnard, 1937

= Paracaesio xanthura =

Species of fish

Paracaesio xanthura, the yellowtail blue snapper, the false fusilier, gold-backed fusilier, Pedley's fusilier or Southern fusilier, is a species of marine ray-finned fish, a snapper belonging to the family Lutjanidae. It is native to the Indo-Pacific region.

== Description ==
Paracaesio xanthura has a fusiform and moderately deep body. It has large eyes which are separated by a convex area, and a short snout which has a length equal to the diameter of the eye. The upper and lower jaws are roughly equal in length and are equipped with an outer row of canine-like teeth and an inner band of small bristle-like teeth. The dorsal fin has 10 spines and 10-11 soft rays while the anal fin has 3 spines and 8-9 soft rays. This species attains a maximum total length of 50 cm (20 in). This species is bright blue with a vivid yellow band which runs along its back and extends onto the caudal peduncle and the caudal fin.

== Distribution ==
Paracaesio xanthura has a wide Indo-Pacific distribution. It is found from Kenya to South Africa on the coast of eastern Africa through the Indian Ocean, including Madagascar, Comoros Islands, Seychelles, Mauritius and Réunion as well as the Gulf of Aden, the Maldives and Chagos Islands, Sri Lanka and southern India. In the Pacific, it is found as far north as southern Japan, south to Australia and from the Andaman Sea in the west east to the Austral Islands. In Australia it is found on the Houtman Abrolhos and the offshore reefs off northwestern Western Australia, as well as the northern Great Barrier Reef in Queensland south to Montague Island in New South Wales and east to Lord Howe Island in the Tasman Sea.

== Habitat and biology ==
Paracaesio xanthura is associated with reefs and is found over rocky substrates where it occasionally forms large aggregations. It feeds mainly on zooplankton and is found at depths between 5 and 250 m (16 and 820 ft).

== Systematics and etymology ==
Paracaesio xanthura was first formally described in 1869 as Caseio xanthurus by the Dutch ichthyologist, herpetologist and physician Pieter Bleeker with the type locality given as Nosy-Bé off Madagascar. When Bleeker created the genus Paracaesio C. xanthoura was its only species and so was the type species by monotypy, subsequently other species were added. The specific name xanthura means "yellow tail", a reference to the yellow caudal peduncle and tail.

== Utilisation ==
Paracaesio xanthura is considered to be a good food fish in some parts of its range and it is mostly taken using handlines and longlines. The catch is sold either fresh or frozen.
