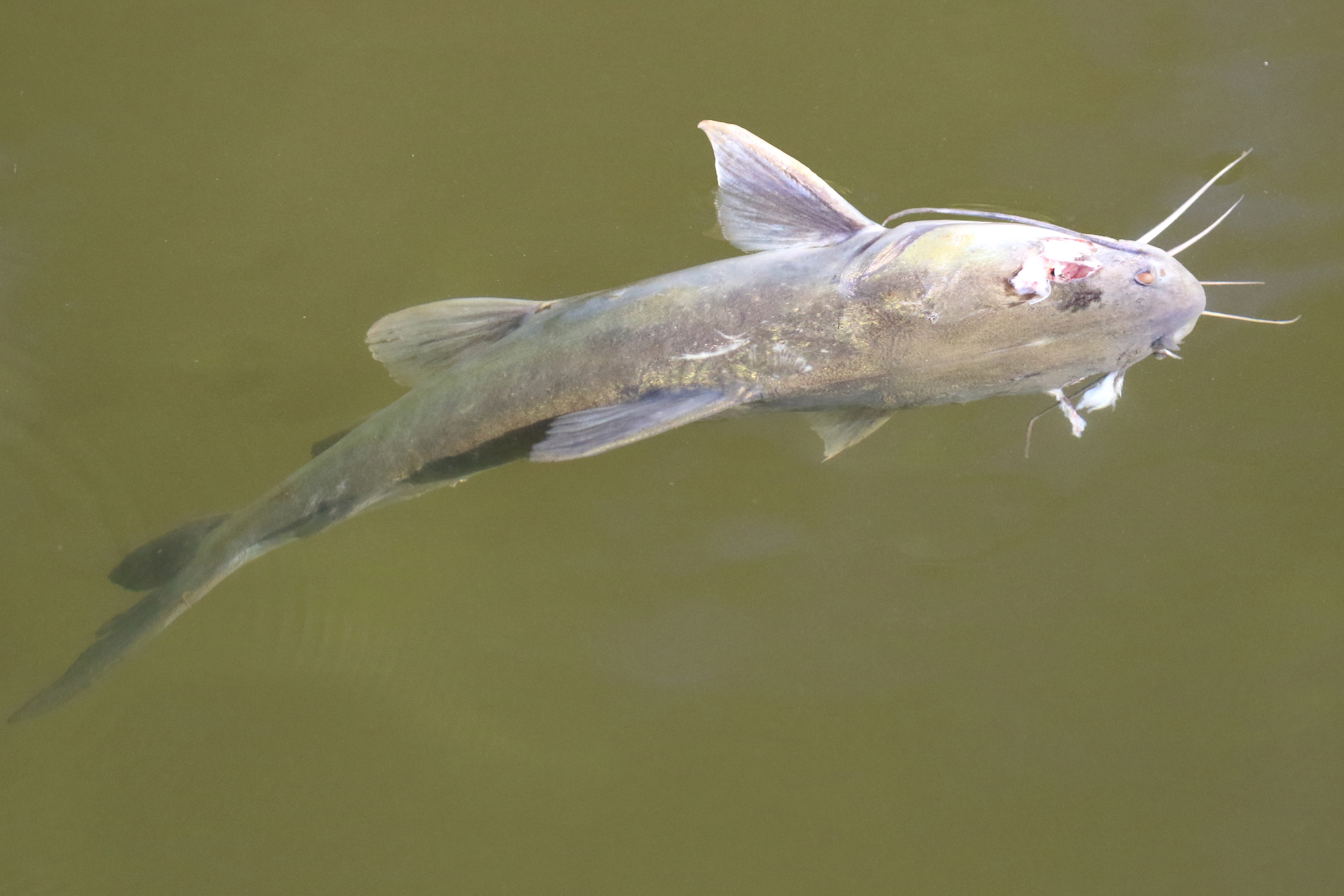

Scientific classification
- Kingdom: Animalia
- Phylum: Chordata
- Class: Actinopterygii
- Order: Siluriformes
- Family: Ariidae
- Genus: Neoarius
- Species: N. graeffei

Binomial name
- Neoarius graeffei Kner & Steindachner, 1867

= Neoarius graeffei =

Species of fish

Neoarius graeffei, or blue salmon catfish, is a species of catfish found in freshwater rivers of Australia and Papua New Guinea. This species is most identifiable by its large, shark-like dorsal fin that is led by a poisonous spine. Like other catfish, the blue salmon catfish is known to use electrical pulses to sense prey in the water. This prey sensing mechanism may be the reason that these catfish are known to eat the land dwelling hopping mouse at a high rate.

== Naming ==
Neoarius graeffei, is also known as the Australian shark catfish, blue salmon catfish, salmon catfish, or lesser salmon catfish. The species name comes from the Swiss entomologist Eduard Heinrich Gräffe, who introduced this species to science. The genus name Arius comes from the Latinization of "Ari" from "Ari gorgora", which is the local Bengali name for a catfish found in India. Neo- was added to Arius to denote that it is a new genus.

== Identifying features ==
This catfish is dusky grey with a bluish tint on the top of its body, while becoming lighter (almost white) closer to its belly. The maximum length that has been observed is 60.0 cm, approximately 1.9 feet. The fish has 4-6 barbels around an average sized mouth. It has a pair of pelvic fins, a pair of pelvic fins, an anal fin (15-19 soft rays), a caudal fin resembling a shark's, an adipose fin, and a tall dorsal fin (7 soft rays). The dorsal fin begins with a sharp spine, and this spine supports the dorsal fin so that it stands out of the water like a shark's dorsal fin. This spine can injure humans handling the fish. The fins are dark, translucent, and darken toward the edges.

== Biology ==
This species of catfish mostly inhabits freshwater rivers and lagoons, and prefers waters that are slightly alkaline. It is also known to enter brackish estuaries and coastal marine waters. The species is not necessarily found in schools, but large groups of juveniles are encountered often.

=== Diet ===
Their diets include arthropods, insects, aquatic plants, mollusks, prawns, crayfish, fishes and bottom detritus. Recent studies have found large sections of the population are eating hopping mice, but it is not known if these mice are consumed after drowning or picked out of the air. These food sources are found using an internal system that resembles electrical sonar.

=== Reproduction ===
N. graeffei breed from September to February, and, though it has not been observed, it is speculated they may undergo distant migrations. The eggs are built into mounds inside of nests made from gravel. Once the species spawns, the fathers incubate the young in their mouths. They do not show parental care after this point, and are the only ariids that exhibit this behavior.

== Distribution ==
Neoarius graeffei is found in the freshwater rivers of Australia and Papua New Guinea.
