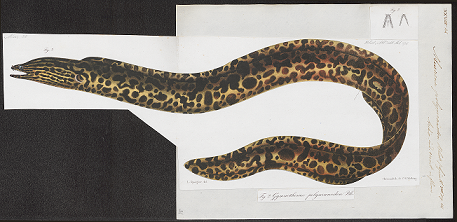

Conservation status
- Least Concern (IUCN 3.1)

Scientific classification
- Kingdom: Animalia
- Phylum: Chordata
- Class: Actinopterygii
- Order: Anguilliformes
- Family: Muraenidae
- Genus: Gymnothorax
- Species: G. polyuranodon

Binomial name
- Gymnothorax polyuranodon (Bleeker, 1854)
- Distribution of Gymnothorax polyuranodon

Synonyms
- Muraena polyuranodon Bleeker, 1854; Polyuranodon kuhlii Kaup, 1856; Uropterygius fijiensis Fowler & Bean, 1923

= Gymnothorax polyuranodon =

Species of fish

Gymnothorax polyuranodon, commonly known as the freshwater moray, is a species of moray eel that is native to the Indo-Pacific region, including Sri Lanka, the Philippines, Indonesia, Papua New Guinea, the northern coastline of Australia, and various islands in the western Pacific. Other common names include the many-toothed moray, spotted freshwater moray, blackspotted moray, freshwater leopard moray, and freshwater tiger moray.

== Description ==
Gymnothorax polyuranodon was named by Pieter Bleeker in 1853. The species can reach a maximum length of 1.5 metres (4 ft 11 in), but it is rarely seen larger than 1 metre (3 ft). Its colouration is yellow or light tan, covered with dark brown spots and blotches. The freshwater moray has very small teeth in proportion to the size of its head, and, like all moray eels, is carnivorous. Its diet consists almost entirely of fish, and occasionally shrimp, bivalves, and worms, and it prefers to eat live food. Like many moray eels, it has poor vision but an excellent sense of smell, and it can be aggressive. The species' saliva is slightly toxic. While not lethal, a bite can nevertheless be very painful, and the injury may result in infection.

== Habitat ==
Gymnothorax polyuranodon is a shallow-water species, often dwelling in water with a depth of just ten feet (three meters) or less. It is found in shallow marine coastal waters, estuaries, river mouths, and for short distances upriver.

For years, it had been the accepted wisdom that the so-called "freshwater" moray eel was actually a marine species which, unlike most other morays, is able to tolerate water with lower salinity levels and could even live in fresh water but only for short periods of time. However, there is a growing body of evidence which suggests that Gymnothorax polyuranodon is a catadromous species of moray eel, in which the animal spends much of its life in freshwater but migrates to saltwater to spawn. The young eels are born in marine water, and then migrate into freshwater to live out most of its life. When the time comes to reproduce, the adult eels migrate back into the ocean to breed. Recently hatched eels, or elvers, are not seen in freshwater, and there is only one record of a G. polyuranodon ever found within saltwater. Juveniles are frequently encountered in brackish water, especially in mangrove forests, which they hide in for protection against larger fish. Adults are commonly found in freshwater, but it's possible that they are only short-term residents of freshwater environments.

In northeastern Australia, specimens of G. polyuranodon were observed over a period of three years in their natural habitat. The majority, nearly three-quarters of the observed specimens, preferred still pools or very slow-flowing water with many boulders for cover within tropical rainforest environments.

== Aquarium trade ==
Gymnothorax polyuranodon is an uncommon species in the wild, and it has been rare in the aquarium pet trade. However, from the mid 2010s onwards, there has been an increasing amount of interest in this species both in terms of private ownership and scientific research. It has been the subject of several scientific papers, and it is becoming more visible in the online market for tropical fish species, although still in very small numbers compared with other eel species.

Because of its full-grown size, it is recommended that the minimum tank size for this eel should be 150 gallons, and preferably larger. All moray eels have very soft skin which can become easily damaged by sharp or rough surfaces, so do not have any broken seashells or coarse gravel in your aquarium. The aquarium should have a bed consisting of either sand or smooth rounded gravel, with many large rocks with multiple openings and overhangs for shelter. The water flow should be set to a low level. As this is a tropical species, the water should be maintained at a temperature range of 24–28 °C (75–82 °F).

Experience gained by aquarists in keeping this species in captivity in a variety of environmental conditions has resulted in certain trends being observed. Most importantly of all is the confusion regarding this species being marketed as a "freshwater" species. Because it is often marketed as such, buyers frequently assume that this fish can only survive in freshwater, which is untrue. It has been established that this eel can survive in pure saltwater, pure freshwater, and various degrees of brackish water. Information on whether or not G. polyuranodon can live long term in freshwater is conflicting. While some sources state that the fish will not live long term in freshwater, a couple of studies do not support these claims. One study concluded based on four collected specimens that "All eels examined had likely resided in freshwater or estuarine habitats throughout their entire lives after metamorphosing from the leptocephalus stage to the juvenile eel stage". The same study goes on to say:

The life history of G. polyuranodon still remains uncertain, but it is clear that this species of marine eel is able to reside in freshwater for extended periods of time. This is evident from the use of this species as a freshwater aquarium species, from collection records of it in freshwater habitats, and from the findings of this study. Most of the collection records in freshwater in Australia were not very far from the high tide mark (<4 km) or were in estuarine habitats (Ebner et al. 2011), and our specimens were collected about 13 km upstream from the river mouth. This species is likely more easily detected in freshwater habitats that are small and accessible to sampling compared to the estuarine and marine habitats where they might also live, but the lack of observations of G. polyuranodon in the marine environment suggests that it may be primarily a freshwater and estuarine species (Ebner et al. 2011).

Another study tested whether or not G. polyuranodon can grow and survive in a freshwater aquarium and noted:

Whether the muraenid Gymnothorax polyuranodon (Bleeker, 1854) can survive, grow and coexist over an extended period in captive freshwater conditions was tested following repeated observations of this species in freshwater streams of the Australian Wet Tropics. Changes in the body size of four individuals held in a 1200 litre freshwater aquarium revealed that yearly growth ranged from a minimum of 21.0 cm total length (TL) and 2.4 times body mass to 26.5 cm TL and 3.9 times body mass. Maximum daily ration of individuals (fed worms, prawns and fish) ranged from 3.4% to 3.9% of body mass...Whilst Gymnothorax polyuranodon has been assumed to be euryhaline (Monkes, 2006), the current study demonstrates that this species is capable of surviving and growing substantially in freshwater. This finding combined with an increasing number of exclusively riverine based observations of adult phase G. polyuranodon in the field (Allen, 1991; Böhlke and McCosker, 2001; Marquet et al., 2003; Jenkins et al., 2009; Ebner et al., 2011, 2016) lends significant support to the idea that G. polyuranodon may actually be a long-term riverine inhabitant in the adult phase.

While some sources note things such as: the lower the level of salt in the water, the less appetite the eel has, and while specimens of this eel may eat heartily in medium or high-salinity brackish water, its appetite drops when in low brackish water, and it might stop eating altogether in freshwater and starve itself, the above study proves these claims wrong. This is due to the fact that G. polyuranodon was noted to have put on growth while living in a freshwater tank for a year. This is corroborated by statements by members on forums such as MonsterFishKeepers who claim to have kept the eel long term in freshwater without ill effects.

Another trend noticed by aquarists is that G. polyuranodon is a highly individualistic species. Different individuals have different personalities, and are therefore to a certain degree unpredictable in terms of their behavior. Some aquarists have been able to keep multiple specimens in the same tank with little to no aggression or competition being displayed amongst them, while others were aggressive and highly territorial. Some specimens will tolerate other tankmates, while other specimens will snap at and even attack and eat any other fish in the tank.

Due to its aggressive nature and its diet of live fish, it is unwise to keep this eel with small fish species because they will probably be eaten. It is best to keep this eel with larger fish, or as a species-only tank. If the eel is well-fed, the likelihood that it will attack and eat its tankmates is greatly reduced. One study showed that if a specimen was well-fed, it usually did not eat again for twenty-four hours. Attempts to keep this eel in aquariums with other individuals of the same species have shown that if the eels are all more-or-less the same size, they are generally tolerant of one another.

While this eel prefers to eat live food, and while it may eat only live food at first when in captivity, it's possible to acclimate the eel to eating prepared foods such as pieces of shrimp, fish, and mussels.

Most moray eels are nocturnal, so the best time to feed them is in the evening. Because morays are scent-based predators, adding too much food into the tank at once will confuse the eel, who will not be able to detect where exactly the scent is coming from. Therefore, it is best to do small-scale target-feeding of the eel, providing it with pieces of meat no larger than its head. Because of its poor eyesight and its toxic saliva, it is unwise to hand-feed the eel; a feeding stick is preferred.

Thomas Flörkemeier has reported that a related species, Gymnothorax tile, commonly known as the Indian Mud Moray Eel, can be killed by the addition of copper-based medications. Therefore, any aquarist considering owning a specimen of G. polyuranodon must take into consideration what the negative effects of adding copper medications to their aquarium might be.

If the intention of the aquarist is to breed this species, then it must be done in a marine aquarium, as breeding likely does not take place within freshwater.

Like all moray eels, this species does not like to be confined in a tank and it will try to escape. Therefore, the whole top of the aquarium must be secured with a tight-fitting lid. This eel, like others, will compress its body and squeeze through the smallest open gap.
