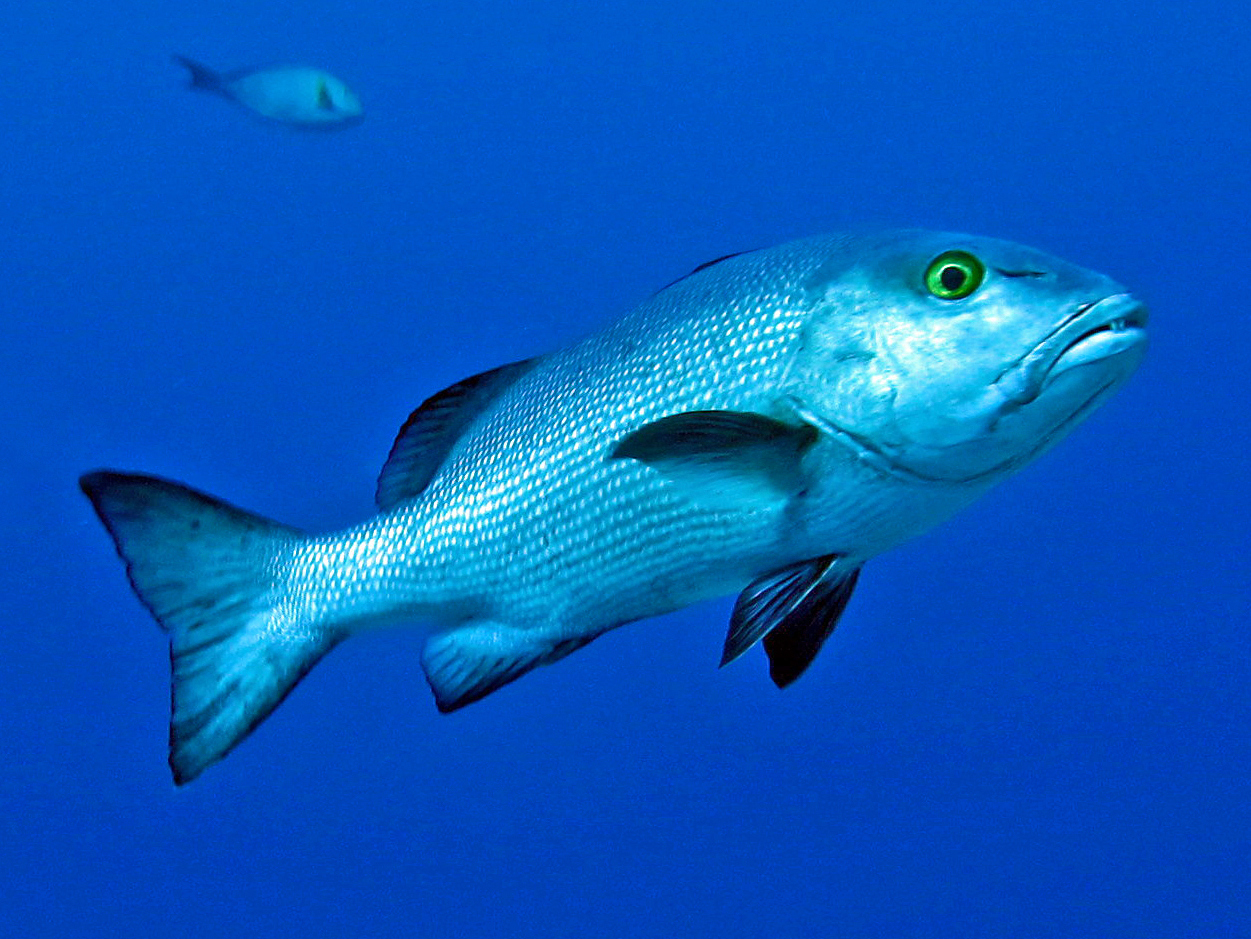
- Lutjanus bohar from French Polynesia

Conservation status
- Least Concern (IUCN 3.1)

Scientific classification
- Kingdom: Animalia
- Phylum: Chordata
- Class: Actinopterygii
- Order: Acanthuriformes
- Family: Lutjanidae
- Genus: Lutjanus
- Species: L. bohar

Binomial name
- Lutjanus bohar (Forsskål, 1775)

Synonyms
- Sciaena bohar Forsskål, 1775; Lutianus bohar (Forsskål, 1775); Sparus lepisurus Lacépède, 1802; Mesoprion rangus G. Cuvier, 1828; Lutjanus rangus (G. Cuvier, 1828); Diacope quadriguttata G. Cuvier, 1828; Diacope labuan Montrouzier, 1857; Mesoprion rubens W. J. Macleay, 1882; Lutianus nukuhivae Seale, 1906; Lutjanus coatesi Whitley, 1934

= Lutjanus bohar =

Species of fish

Lutjanus bohar, the two-spot red snapper, red bass, twinspot snapper or bohar snapper, is a species of marine ray-finned fish, a snapper belonging to the family Lutjanidae, not to be confused with the unrelated Australian snapper. It has a wide Indo-Pacific distribution.

== Taxonomy ==
Lutjanus bohar was first formally described as Sciaena bohar in 1775 with no type locality given, although it is thought to be the Red Sea. The description is attributed to the Finnish-born Swedish explorer Peter Forsskål by FishBase, but the Catalog of Fishes attributes as follows

"Fabricius [J. C.] in Niebuhr (ex Forsskål) 1775:46, xi [Descriptiones animalium (Forsskål)"

Catalog of Fishes then states that the valid binomial is Lutjanus bohar (Fabricius, 1775).

The specific name bohar is the Arabic word used for this fish in the Red Sea.

== Description ==
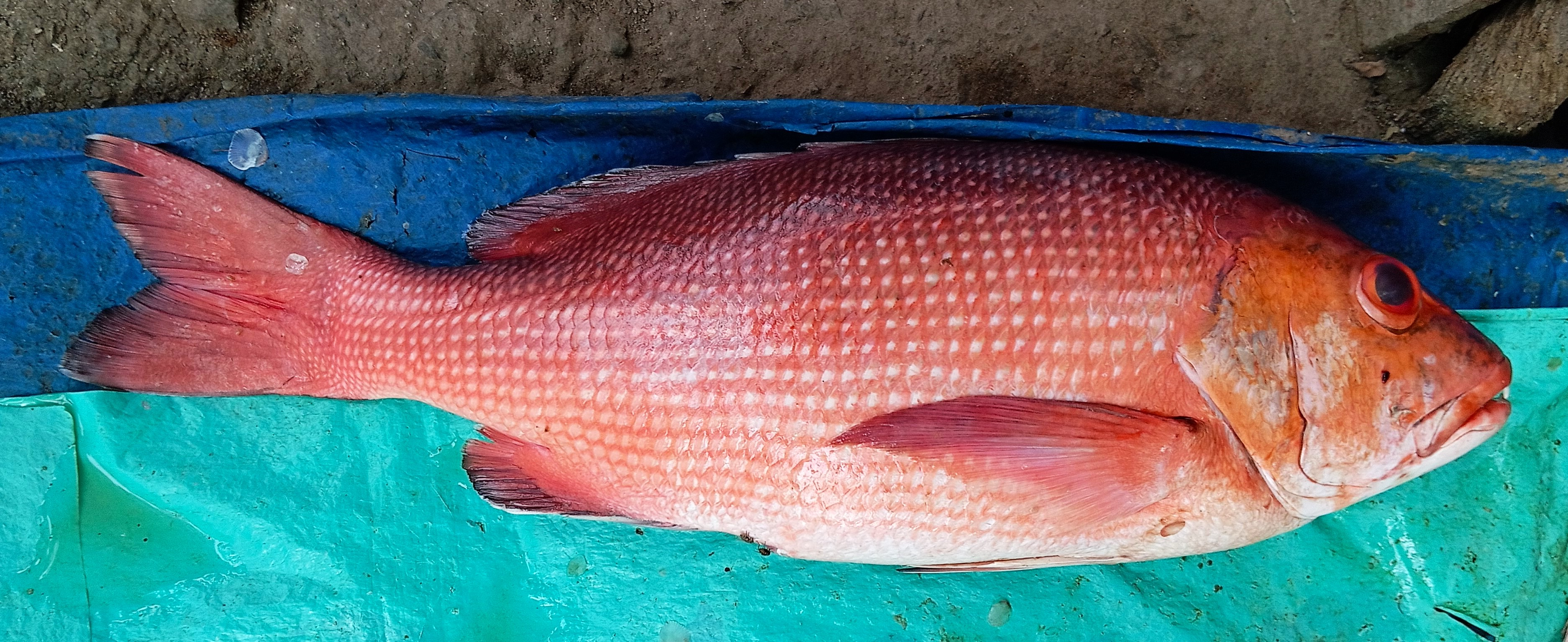
Red Sea Bass, West Bengal, India

The two-spot red snapper can reach a length of 90 cm (35 in), though most do not exceed 76 cm (30 in). The greatest recorded weight for this species is 12.5 kg (28 lb). These large reddish tropical snappers show darker fins, a rounded profile of head and a groove running from the nostrils to the eyes. They have 10 dorsal spines and 3 anal spines. Juveniles and some adults have two silvery-white spots (hence the common name) on the back close to their dorsal fins, while larger adults lose the spots and become mostly red. Large adults may cause ciguatera poisoning.

This species is a commercially important species and is also sought after as a game fish.

== Biology ==
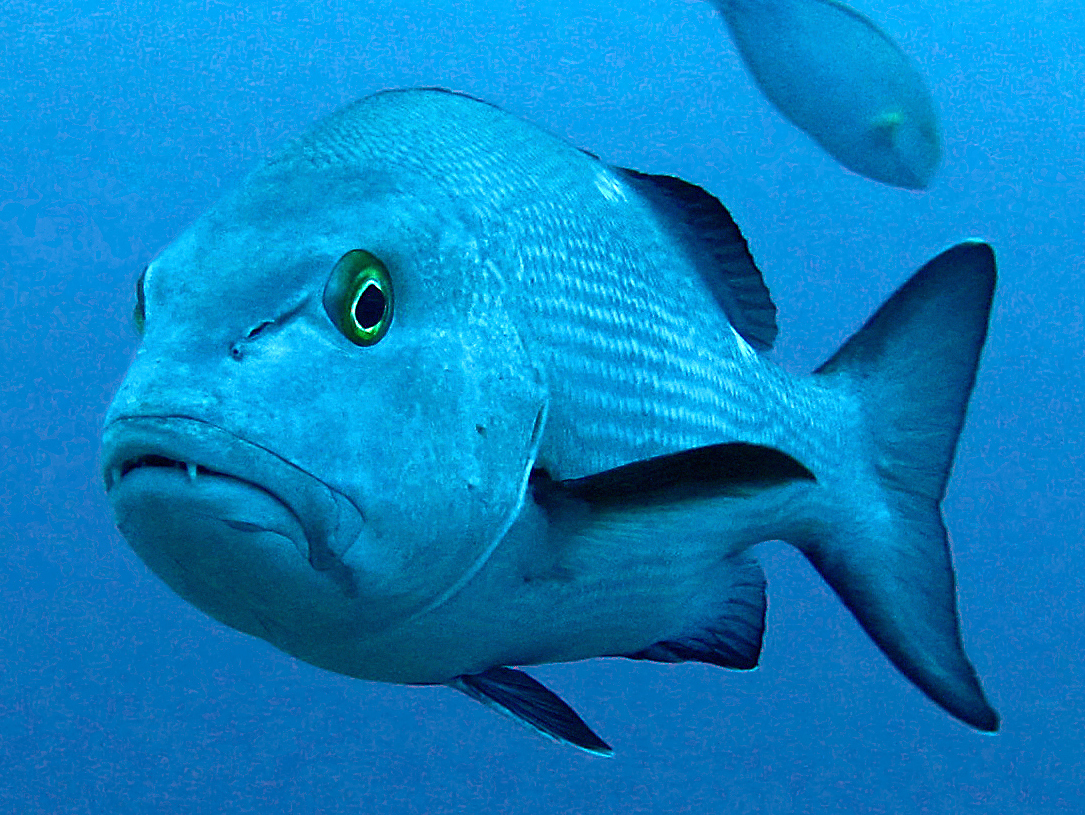
Close-up

It is a long-lived and slow-growing species which reaches maturity at 8–9 years, and the oldest recorded individual is 56. These fishes are carnivorous, mostly feeding on other fishes, crustaceans and molluscs.

Adult snappers often form large schools on the outer reefs or above sandy areas, mainly to form spawning aggregations. Small brownish juveniles mimic damselfishes of the genus Chromis in order to approach their prey.

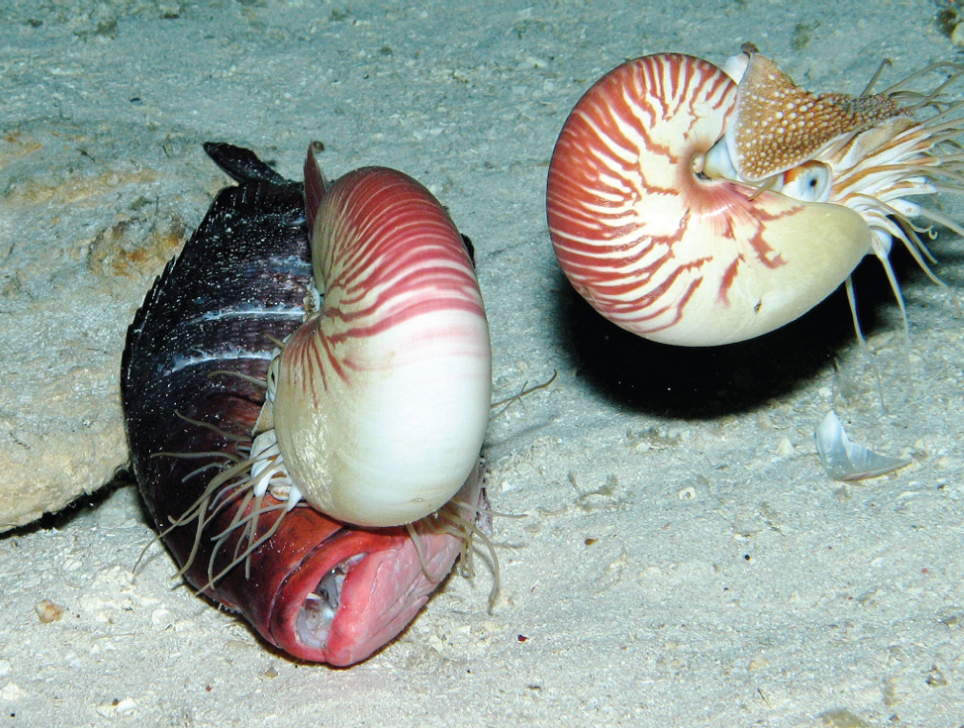
Two chambered nautiluses feeding on a two-spot red snapper.

The chambered nautilus, Nautilus pompilius, is known to scavenge deceased snappers. A pair of nautiluses recorded feeding on a snapper at 703 metres below the surface constitutes the deepest recorded sighting of any nautilus species.

== Distribution ==
This species is native to the Indian Ocean. It is widespread in the Indo-Pacific from the east African coast, north to the Red Sea, to the western Pacific Ocean, north to the Ryukyu Islands, south to Australia.

== Habitat ==
It is a coral reef inhabitant, being found at depths from 4 to 180 m (13 to 591 ft), though usually between 10 and 70 m (33 and 230 ft).

== Bibliography ==
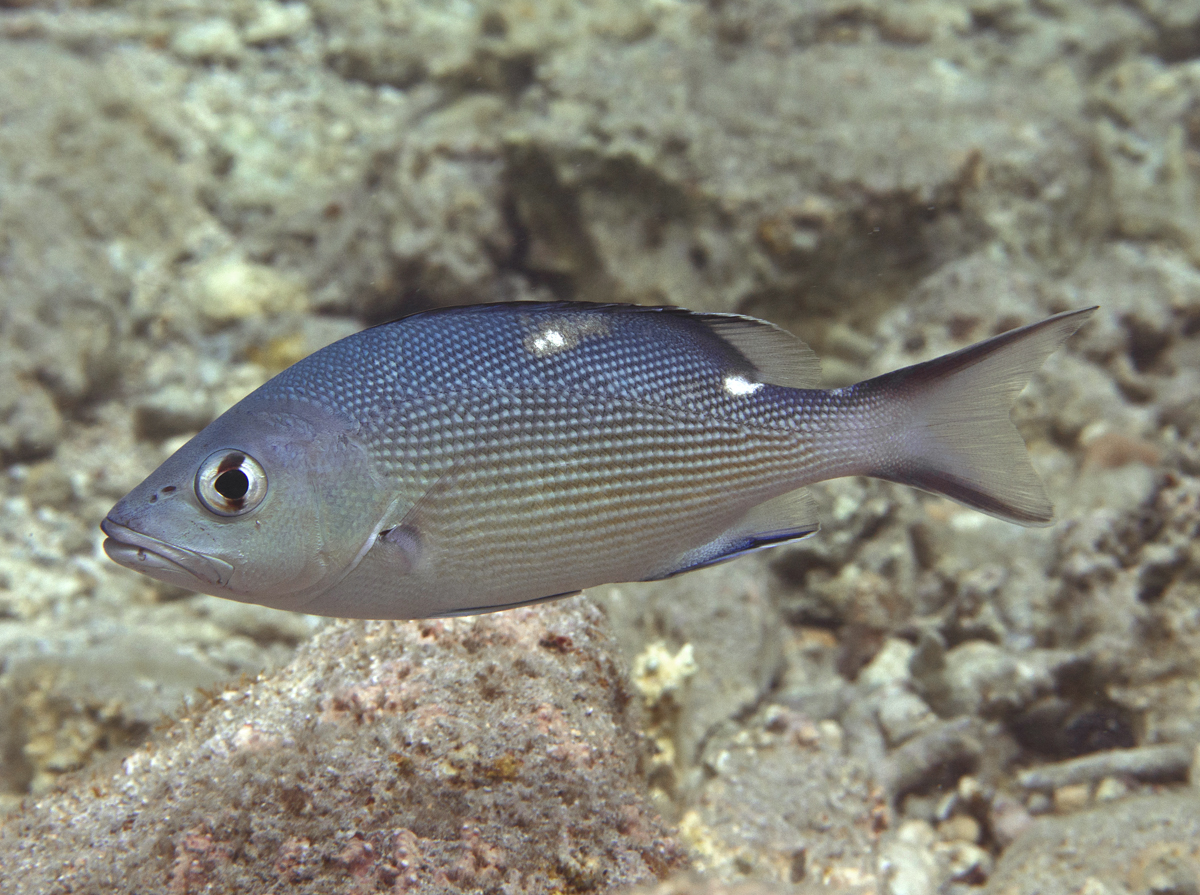
Juvenile Lutjanus bohar with two white spots on back

- Allen, G.R., 1985. FAO Species Catalogue. Vol. 6. Snappers of the world. An annotated and illustrated catalogue of lutjanid species known to date. FAO Fish. Synop. 125(6):208 p. Rome: FAO.
- Frimodt, C., 1995. Multilingual illustrated guide to the world's commercial coldwater fish. Fishing News Books, Osney Mead, Oxford,. 215 p.
- Fenner, Robert M.: The Conscientious Marine Aquarist. Neptune City, USA: T.F.H. Publications, 2001.
- Helfman, G., B. Collette y D. Facey: The diversity of fishes. Blackwell Science, Malden, Massachusetts, USA, 1997.
- Hoese, D.F. 1986: . A M.M. Smith y P.C. Heemstra (eds.) Smiths' sea fishes. Springer-Verlag, Berlin, Germany.

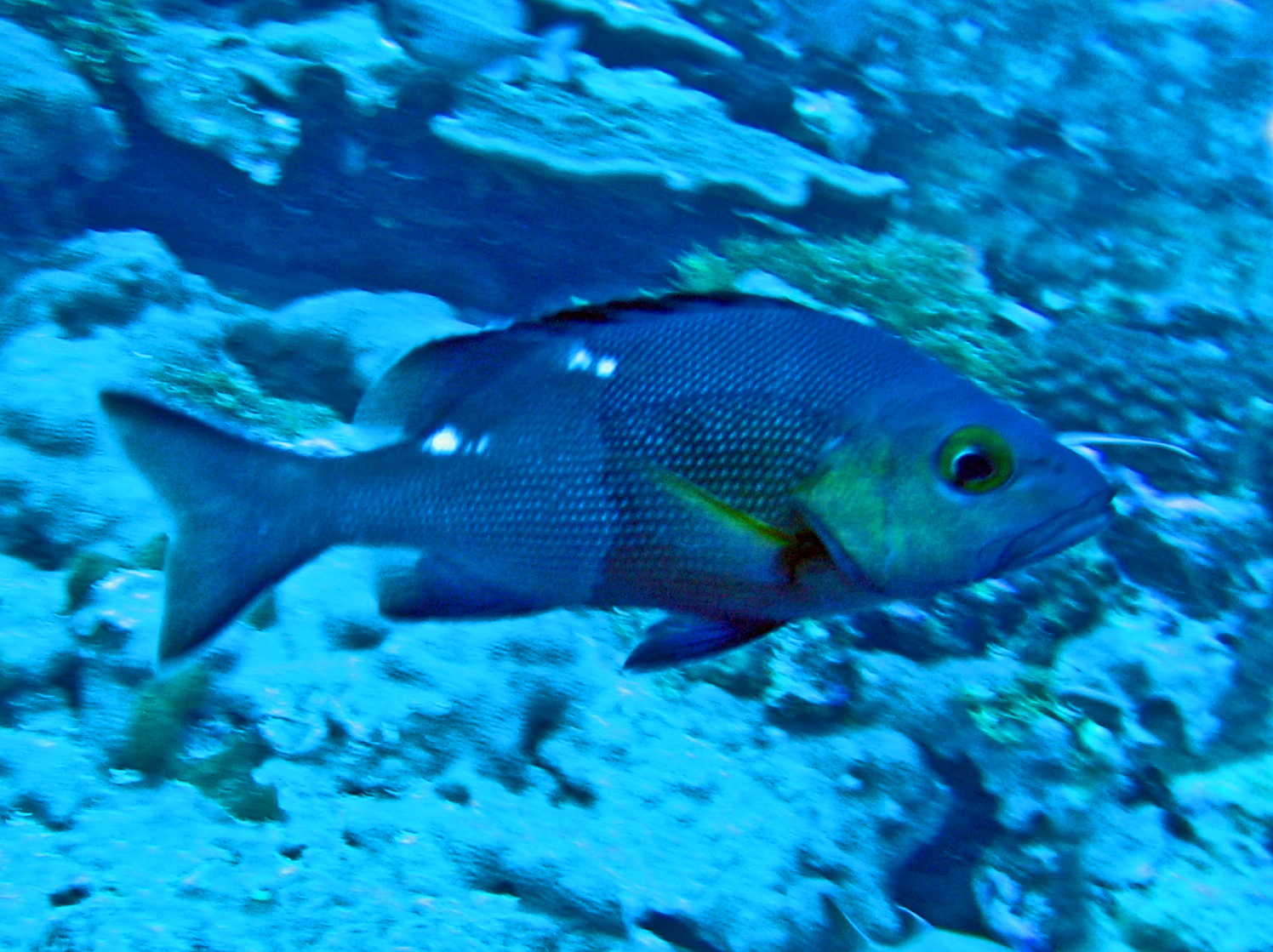
Two-spot red snapper

- Maugé, L.A. 1986. A J. Daget, J.-P. Gosse y D.F.E. Thys van den Audenaerde (eds.) Check-list of the freshwater fishes of Africa (CLOFFA).
- Moyle, P. y J. Cech.: Fishes: An Introduction to Ichthyology, 4th. Ed., Upper Saddle River, USA: Prentice-Hall. Año 2000.
- Nelson, J.: Fishes of the World, 3rd ed.. New York: John Wiley and Sons.
- Wheeler, A.: The World Encyclopedia of Fishes, 2nd. Ed. London: Macdonald. 1985.
