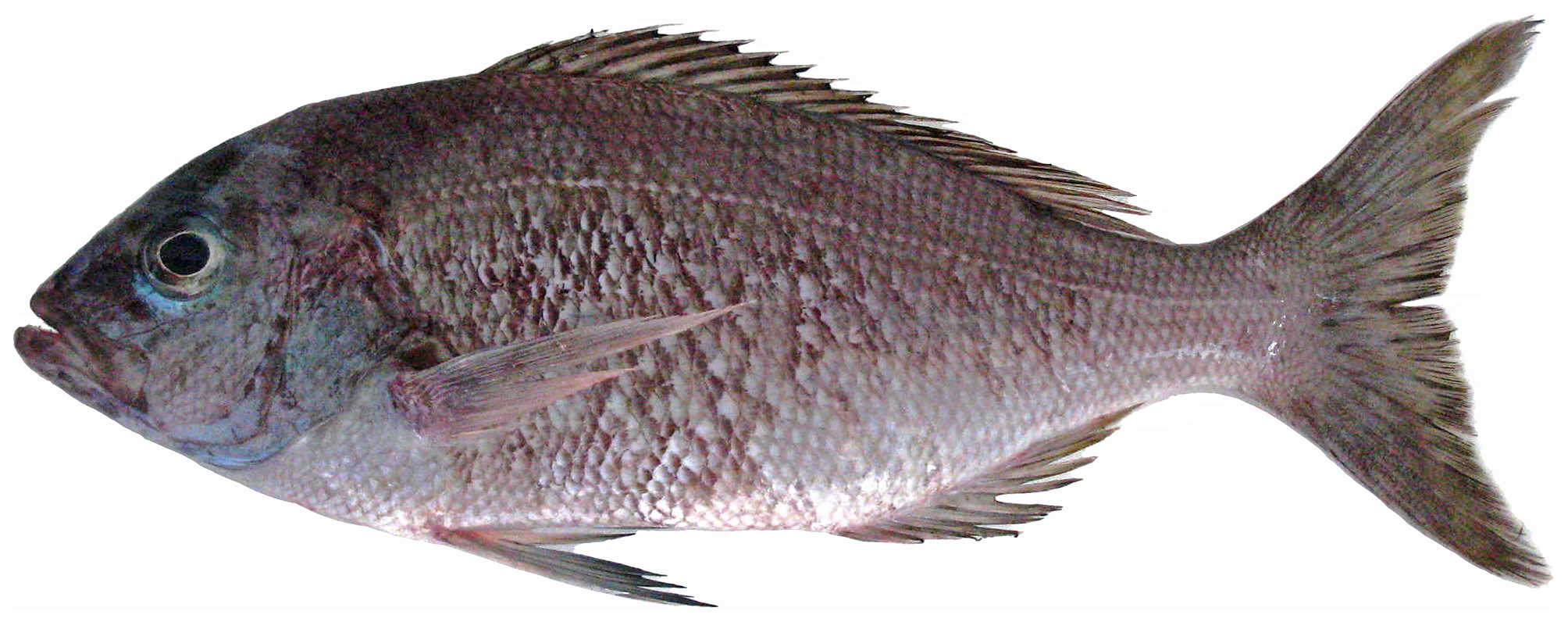

Conservation status
- Least Concern (IUCN 3.1)

Scientific classification
- Kingdom: Animalia
- Phylum: Chordata
- Class: Actinopterygii
- Order: Acanthuriformes
- Family: Lutjanidae
- Genus: Apsilus
- Species: A. dentatus

Binomial name
- Apsilus dentatus Guichenot, 1853

Synonyms
- Tropidinius dentatus (Guichenot, 1853); Mesoprion arnillo Poey, 1860

= Apsilus dentatus =

Species of fish

Apsilus dentatus, the black snapper, is a species of marine ray-finned fish, a snapper belonging to the family Lutjanidae. It is found in the western Atlantic Ocean.

== Description ==
Apsilus dentatus has an elongated, oval shaped body. The intraorbital area is convex and the upper jaw can be protruded to a moderate extent, slipping under the cheek bone for much of its length when the mouth is closed. The jaws have distinct canine-like teeth with an inner band of simple teeth and an outer band of conical teeth. There are small conical teeth on the front and sides of the palate, as well as a central tooth triangular or v-shaped patch. The preoperculum is serrated. The dorsal fin is continuous with not incision between the spined and soft-rayed portions. The bases of the dorsal and anal fin are scaleless, the dorsal fin contains 10 spines and 9-10 soft rays while the anal fin has 3 spines and 8 soft rays. The colour of this species are that the back and upper flanks are violet or dark brown, deeper on head with the lower flanks and the abdomen being paler. The juveniles have a bright blue body, a black margined bronze iris, dark fins with the caudal fin having a pale rear margin, here may be some blue on the fins. The maximum total length attained by this species is 65 cm (26 in), although 40 cm (16 in) is more typical, while the maximum published weight is 3.2 kg (7.1 lb).

== Distribution ==
Apsilus dentatus is present throughout the Caribbean Sea and the Gulf of Mexico. They are found from the Florida Keys and the Bahamas south through the West Indies to the islands off Venezuela and Belize. In the Gulf of Mexico they have been recorded from the Flower Garden Banks. They are thought to be more widely distributed than this.

== Habitat and biology ==
Apsilus dentatus is found at depths between 12 and 300 m (39 and 984 ft), typically deeper than 40 m (130 ft), although young fish have been found near the surface. It prefers rocky substrates. It is a predatory species which eats fishes and benthic invertebrates, including cephalopods and tunicates. Spawning takes place nearly year round, peaking in the period February to April, in September and October and, off Jamaica, in November.

== Systematics and etymology ==
Apsilus dentatus was first formally described in 1853 by the French zoologist Alphonse Guichenot with the type locality given as Havana. The specific name dentatus means "toothed" and refers to the obvious upper front jaw canine teeth.

== Utilisation ==
Apsilus dentatus is of limited interest to fisheries, although the flesh has been described as being of good quality. The only part of their range where they are regular in markets is on Cuba, usually sold fresh, although freezing is nor unknown. They are caught using handlines. They have been a source of ciguatera poisoning in humans following consumption.
