= Patricia J. Kailola =

Australian ichthyologist

Patricia J. Kailola is an Australian ichthyologist. Her primary focus is in tropical Indo-Pacific fishes. She has worked in the Marine Studies program at the University of the South Pacific since 1995 and is an Australian Museum Research Associate. Among her numerous publications are listed several books covering tropical fish. She also has written texts on catfish. As of April 2006, she was working on a textbook on Western Indian Ocean fishes. She has assisted the Australian Museum in confirmation of species identification among their collection. Worldcat.org lists 27 works in 57 publications in 1 language and 603 library holdings.

Kailola graduated in 1990 from the University of Adelaide with a PhD in zoology titled "The catfish family Ariidae (Teleostei) in New Guinea and Australia: relationships, systematics and zoogeography".

She has been involved in studies of the following fish:

- Himantura
- Glossolepis
- Lake Wanam rainbowfish
- Amissidens hainesi
- Aspistor
- Paraplagusia
- Hortle's whipray
- Ilisha
- Cochlefelis
- Hemiarius
- Neoarius
- Plicofollis
- Sciades
- Paracaesio
- Branchiostegus
- Ozichthys

== Taxon described by her ==
- See Category:Taxa named by Patricia J. Kailola

== Taxon named in her honor ==
- The Whipfin sea catfish, Netuma patriciae Y. Takahashi, Seishi Kimura & Motomura, 2019, is a species of catfish in the family Ariidae found in the Western Pacific Ocean from the Philippines.
- The Kailola's sea catfish, Cathorops kailolae Marceniuk & Betancur-R., 2008. It is a tropical fresh and saltwater catfish which occurs in Central America
