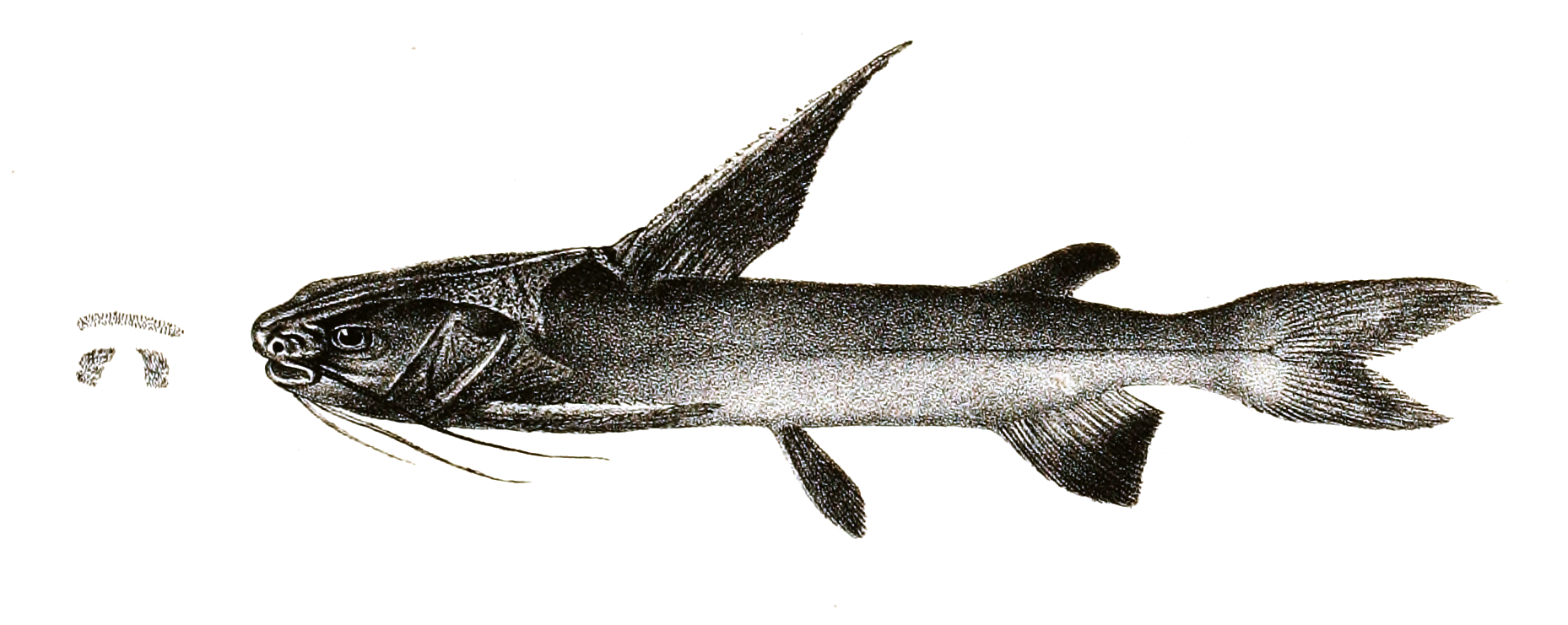

Scientific classification
- Kingdom: Animalia
- Phylum: Chordata
- Class: Actinopterygii
- Order: Siluriformes
- Family: Ariidae
- Genus: Nemapteryx
- Species: N. caelata

Binomial name
- Nemapteryx caelata (Valenciennes, 1840)

Synonyms
- Arius caelatus Valenciennes, 1840; Arius coelatus Valenciennes, 1840; Cephalocassis coelatus (Valenciennes, 1840); Nemapteryx caelatus (Valenciennes, 1840); Tachysurus caelatus (Valenciennes, 1840)

= Nemapteryx caelata =

Species of fish

Nemapteryx caelata, the engraved catfish or engraved sea catfish, is a species of catfish in the family Ariidae. It was described by Achille Valenciennes in 1840, originally under the genus Arius. It inhabits marine and brackish waters in Bangladesh, India, Myanmar, Pakistan, Sri Lanka, and Thailand. It reaches a maximum total length of 45 cm (18 in), more commonly reaching a TL of 24 cm (9.4 in).

The diet of the engraved catfish consists of finfish and benthic invertebrates. Its meat is marketed fresh, as well as dried and salted.
