= Nedystoma dayi =

Scientific classification
- Kingdom: Animalia
- Phylum: Chordata
- Class: Actinopterygii
- Order: Siluriformes
- Family: Ariidae
- Genus: Nedystoma
- Species: N. dayi

Binomial name
- Nedystoma dayi (Ramsay & Ogilby, 1886)

Synonyms
- Hemipimelodus dayi Ramsay & Ogilby, 1886

Species of fish

Nedystoma dayi, or Day's catfish, is a species of catfish in the family Ariidae. It was described by Edward Pierson Ramsay and James Douglas Ogilby in 1886, originally under the genus Hemipimelodus. It inhabits turbid freshwater rivers in New Guinea. It reaches a maximum standard length of 20 cm (7.9 in). Its diet consists of the larvae of aquatic insects.
