= White sea catfish =

White sea catfish is a common name for several fishes and may refer to:

- Galeichthys feliceps, native to southern Africa
- Genidens barbus, native to the Rio de la Plata Basin and adjacent ocean
