= Potamosilurus velutinus =

Scientific classification
- Kingdom: Animalia
- Phylum: Chordata
- Class: Actinopterygii
- Order: Siluriformes
- Family: Ariidae
- Genus: Potamosilurus
- Species: P. velutinus

Binomial name
- Potamosilurus velutinus (M. C. W. Weber, 1907)

Synonyms
- Hemipimelodus velutinus Weber, 1907; Arius velutinus (Weber, 1907); Neoarius velutinus (Weber, 1907); Hemipimelodus papillifer Herre, 1935

Species of fish

Potamosilurus velutinus, the papillate catfish, is a species of catfish in the family Ariidae. It was described by Max Carl Wilhelm Weber in 1907, originally under the genus Hemipimelodus. It inhabits freshwater lakes and rivers in New Guinea. Its diet includes mayflies and other terrestrial and aquatic insects, detritus, benthic algae, and crustaceans.

Potamosilurus velutinus reaches a maximum known standard length of 60 cm (24 in), but usually reaches an SL of 35 cm (14 in). It reaches a maximum weight of 3.5 kg (7 lb 11 oz). It spawns throughout the year. It is harvested by subsistence fisheries.
