= Genidens planifrons =

Scientific classification
- Domain: Eukaryota
- Kingdom: Animalia
- Phylum: Chordata
- Class: Actinopterygii
- Order: Siluriformes
- Family: Ariidae
- Genus: Genidens
- Species: G. planifrons

Binomial name
- Genidens planifrons (Higuchi, Reis & Araújo, 1982)

Synonyms
- Netuma planifrons Higuchi, Reis & Araújo, 1982

Species of fish

Genidens planifrons is a species of catfish in the family Ariidae. It was described by Horacio Higuchi, Enir Girondi Reis and Francisco Gerson Araújo in 1982, originally under the genus Netuma. It migrates between the Lagoa dos Patos and the region of the Atlantic Ocean which it drains into. It reaches a standard length of 57 cm (22 in).
