= Mozambique sea catfish =

Scientific classification
- Kingdom: Animalia
- Phylum: Chordata
- Class: Actinopterygii
- Order: Siluriformes
- Family: Ariidae
- Genus: Plicofollis
- Species: P. polystaphylodon

Binomial name
- Plicofollis polystaphylodon (Bleeker, 1846)

Synonyms
- Arius polystaphylodon Bleeker, 1846; Arius polystaphilodon Bleeker, 1846; Tachysurus polystaphylodon (Bleeker, 1846)

Species of fish

The Mozambique sea catfish (Plicofollis polystaphylodon), also known as the Mozambican sea catfish, is a species of catfish in the family Ariidae. It was described by Pieter Bleeker in 1846, originally under the genus Arius. It inhabits marine and freshwaters in the western Pacific and western Indian Ocean. It reaches a maximum standard length of 35 cm (14 in).

The diet of the Mozambique sea catfish consists of benthic invertebrates. It is harvested by commercial fisheries, and its meat is generally marketed fresh.
