= Smooth-headed catfish =

Scientific classification
- Kingdom: Animalia
- Phylum: Chordata
- Class: Actinopterygii
- Order: Siluriformes
- Family: Ariidae
- Genus: Plicofollis
- Species: P. nellanella

Binomial name
- Plicofollis nellanella (Valenciennes, 1840)

Synonyms
- Pimelodus nella Valenciennes, 1840; Arius nella (Valenciennes, 1840); Arius leiotetocephalus Bleeker, 1846; Tachysurus leiotetocephalus (Bleeker, 1846); Bagrus meyenii Müller & Troschel, 1849

Species of fish

The smooth-headed catfish (Plicofollis nella), also known as the shieldhead catfish, is a species of catfish in the family Ariidae. It was described by Achille Valenciennes in 1840, originally under the genus Pimelodus. It inhabits marine and brackish waters in New Guinea, Australia, and southern and southeastern Asia. It reaches a maximum total length of 47 cm (19 in).
