= Potamosilurus macrorhynchus =

Conservation status
- Least Concern (IUCN 3.1)

Scientific classification
- Kingdom: Animalia
- Phylum: Chordata
- Class: Actinopterygii
- Division: Teleostei
- Order: Siluriformes
- Family: Ariidae
- Genus: Potamosilurus; Marceniuk & Menezes, 2007
- Species: P. macrorhynchus

Binomial name
- Potamosilurus macrorhynchus (M. C. W. Weber, 1913)

Synonyms
- Hemipimelodus aaldereni Hardenberg, 1936; Hemipimelodus macrorhynchus Weber, 1913

Species of fish

Potamosilurus macrorhynchus, commonly known as the sharp-nose catfish, is a species of sea catfish endemic to the island of New Guinea where it is found in both Papua New Guinea and in West Papua, the Indonesian part of the island. It is a strictly fresh water catfish and grows to a length of 50 cm (20 in).
