= Rough-head sea catfish =

Conservation status
- Least Concern (IUCN 3.1)

Scientific classification
- Kingdom: Animalia
- Phylum: Chordata
- Class: Actinopterygii
- Order: Siluriformes
- Family: Ariidae
- Genus: Carlarius
- Species: C. latiscutatus

Binomial name
- Carlarius latiscutatus Günther, 1864

Synonyms
- Arius biscutatus Günther, 1864; Arius lagoensis Pfaff, 1933; Arius latiscutatus Günther, 1864; Tachysurus lagoensis (Pfaff, 1933)

Species of fish

The Rough-head sea catfish (Carlarius latiscutatus), also known as the marine catfish, is a species of sea catfish in the family Ariidae. It was described by Albert Günther in 1864. It inhabits tropical marine and brackish waters in the eastern Atlantic region, including Angola, Senegal, and Bioko. It dwells at a depth range of 0 to 70 m (0 to 230 ft), most often between 0 to 30 m (0 to 98 ft). It reaches a maximum total length of 85 cm (33 in), but more commonly reaches a TL of 40 cm (16 in).

The rough-head sea catfish is of commercial interest to fisheries.
