= Pararius mastersi =

Scientific classification
- Kingdom: Animalia
- Phylum: Chordata
- Class: Actinopterygii
- Order: Siluriformes
- Family: Ariidae
- Genus: Pararius
- Species: P. mastersi

Binomial name
- Pararius mastersi (Ogilby, 1898)

Synonyms
- Arius mastersi Ogilby, 1898; Arius sagoroides Hardenberg, 1941; Sciades mastersi (Ogilby, 1898); Tachysurus godfreyi Whitley, 1941; Hexanematichthys mastersi (Ogilby, 1898)

Species of fish

Pararius mastersi, the Master's catfish or Godfrey's catfish, is a species of catfish in the family Ariidae. It was described by James Douglas Ogilby in 1898, originally under the genus Arius. It dwells on the floors of inshore marine waters in Australia and Papua New Guinea. It reaches a maximum total length of 51 cm (20 in).
