= Potamosilurus coatesi =

Conservation status
- Data Deficient (IUCN 3.1)

Scientific classification
- Kingdom: Animalia
- Phylum: Chordata
- Class: Actinopterygii
- Order: Siluriformes
- Family: Ariidae
- Genus: Potamosilurus
- Species: P. coatesi

Binomial name
- Potamosilurus coatesi (Kailola, 1990)

Synonyms
- Arius coatesi Kailola, 1990; Neoarius coatesi Kailola, 1990

Species of fish

Potamosilurus coatesi, or Coates' catfish, is a species of catfish in the family Ariidae. It was described by Patricia J. Kailola in 1990, originally under the genus Arius. It is endemic to Papua New Guinea, being only known from the Sepik and Ramu Rivers. It reaches a maximum standard length of 75 cm (30 in), more commonly reaching an SL of 45 cm (18 in). Its maximum known weight is 5 kg (11 lb).

The diet of Potamosilurus coatesi includes Macrobrachium prawns, aquatic insects and worms, detritus, bark, seeds and bony fish such as Ophieleotris aporos. It has been recorded spawning all year round.
