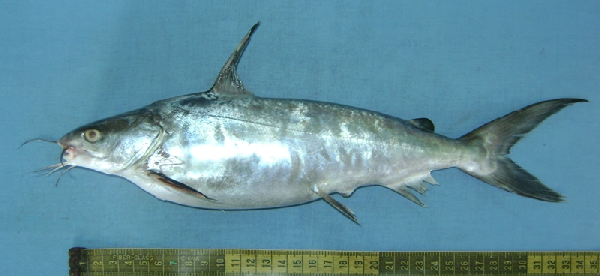

Conservation status
- Least Concern (IUCN 3.1)

Scientific classification
- Kingdom: Animalia
- Phylum: Chordata
- Class: Actinopterygii
- Order: Siluriformes
- Family: Ariidae
- Genus: Netuma
- Species: N. thalassina

Binomial name
- Netuma thalassina (Rüppell, 1837)

Synonyms
- Arius thalassinus (Rüppell, 1837); Arius nasutus Valenciennes, 1840; Arius andamanensis Day, 1871; Arius serratus Day, 1877; Ariodes aeneus Sauvage, 1883; Bagrus thalassinus Rüppell, 1837; Bagrus carchariorhynchos Bleeker, 1846; Bagrus carchariorhijnchos Bleeker, 1846; Bagrus netuma Valenciennes, 1840; Bagrus laevigatus Valenciennes, 1840; Netuma thalassinus (Rüppell, 1837); Netuna thalassina (Rüppell, 1837); Netuma thalassina jacksonensis Whitley, 1941; Tachysurus thalassinus (Rüppell, 1837); Tachysurus serratus (Day, 1877)

= Giant catfish =

Species of fish

The giant catfish (Netuma thalassina), also known as the giant sea catfish, giant salmon catfish, giant marine-catfish, or the khagga, is a species of catfish in the family Ariidae. It was described by Eduard Rüppell in 1837, originally under the genus Bagrus. It inhabits estuaries and occasionally freshwater bodies, in Japan, Australia, Polynesia, southern Vietnam in the Mekong Delta, the Red Sea and the northwestern Indian Ocean. It dwells at a depth range of 10 to 195 m (30 to 640 ft). It reaches a maximum total length of 185 cm (73 in), but usually reaches a TL of 70 cm (28 in).

The diet of the giant catfish includes crustaceans such as crabs, shrimp, prawns and stomatopods; worms, finfish, cephalopods, sea cucumbers, and mollusks. It spawns between April and August.

The giant catfish is harvested commercially and recreationally.
