= Plicofollis magatensis =

Scientific classification
- Domain: Eukaryota
- Kingdom: Animalia
- Phylum: Chordata
- Class: Actinopterygii
- Order: Siluriformes
- Family: Ariidae
- Genus: Plicofollis
- Species: P. magatensis

Binomial name
- Plicofollis magatensis (Herre, 1926)

Synonyms
- Arius magatensis Herre, 1926

Species of fish

Plicofollis magatensis is a species of catfish in the family Ariidae. It was described by Albert William Herre in 1926, originally under the genus Arius. It inhabits freshwaters in the Philippines. It reaches a maximum total length of 45 cm (18 in).
