= Chinchaysuyoa ortegai =

Scientific classification
- Kingdom: Animalia
- Phylum: Chordata
- Class: Actinopterygii
- Order: Siluriformes
- Family: Ariidae
- Genus: Chinchaysuyoa
- Species: C. ortegai

Binomial name
- Chinchaysuyoa ortegai Marceniuk, Marchena, Oliveira, and Betancur-R, 2019

Species of fish

Chinchaysuyoa ortegai is a species of catfish in the family Ariidae. It is endemic to freshwater bodies in northern Peru. Specimens of this species were formerly classified as Hexanematichthys henni (now C. labiata) until they were found to actually represent a new species in the genus Chinchaysuyoa.
