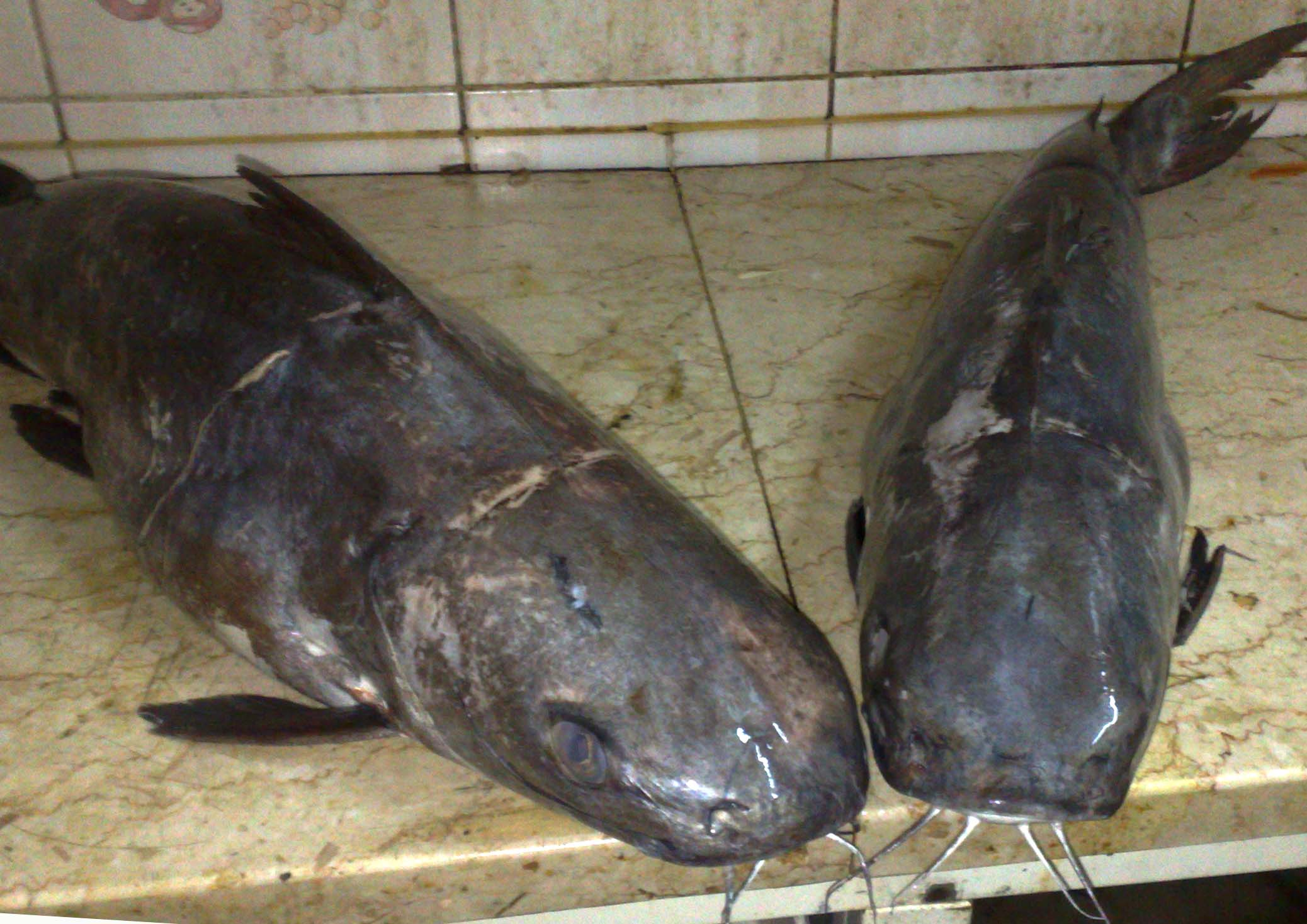

Conservation status
- Least Concern (IUCN 3.1)

Scientific classification
- Kingdom: Animalia
- Phylum: Chordata
- Class: Actinopterygii
- Order: Siluriformes
- Family: Ariidae
- Genus: Plicofollis
- Species: P. dussumieri

Binomial name
- Plicofollis dussumieri (Valenciennes, 1840)

Synonyms
- Arius dussumieri Valenciennes, 1840; Arius goniaspis Bleeker, 1857; Arius kirkii Günther, 1864; Ariodes dussumieri (Valenciennes, 1840); Tachysurus dussumieri (Valenciennes, 1840)

= Blacktip sea catfish =

Species of fish

The blacktip sea catfish (Plicofollis dussumieri), also known as Dussumier's catfish, giant marine cat fish, Shupanga sea catfish, and tropical seacatfish, is a species of catfish in the family Ariidae. It was described by Achille Valenciennes in 1840, originally under the genus Arius. It inhabits rivers and marine waters ranging between Africa and India in the Indo-western Pacific. It dwells at a depth range of 20 to 50 m (70 to 160 ft). It reaches a maximum standard length of 62 cm (24 in), and a maximum weight of 1.4 kg (3 lb 1 oz).

The blacktip sea catfish feeds on finfish and benthic invertebrates. It is harvested for its meat, which is marketed both fresh and dried-salted. Due to a lack of known significant threats to the species, it is currently ranked as Least Concern by the IUCN redlist.
