= Potamosilurus taylori =

Conservation status
- Critically Endangered (IUCN 3.1)

Scientific classification
- Kingdom: Animalia
- Phylum: Chordata
- Class: Actinopterygii
- Order: Siluriformes
- Family: Ariidae
- Genus: Potamosilurus
- Species: P. taylori

Binomial name
- Potamosilurus taylori (Roberts, 1978)

Synonyms
- Arius taylori; Neoarius taylori

Species of fish

Potamosilurus taylori (Taylor's catfish) is a species of fish in the family Ariidae. It is found in Indonesia and Papua New Guinea.
