= Cryptarius truncatus =

Scientific classification
- Kingdom: Animalia
- Phylum: Chordata
- Class: Actinopterygii
- Order: Siluriformes
- Family: Ariidae
- Genus: Cryptarius
- Species: C. truncatus

Binomial name
- Cryptarius truncatus (Valenciennes in Cuvier and Valenciennes, 1840)

Synonyms
- Arius truncatus

Species of fish

Cryptarius truncatus, the spoonsnouted catfish, is a species of sea catfish from estuaries and lower courses of rivers from the Chao Phraya to Sumatra and Java, including the lower Mekong. It inhabits brackish waters of Thailand, Cambodia, Indonesia, and Malaysia. This species has a maximum length of 42 cm (17 in) in length. This fish species feeds on fishes and crustaceans. It is caught for human consumption.
