= Galeichthys ater =

Scientific classification
- Kingdom: Animalia
- Phylum: Chordata
- Class: Actinopterygii
- Division: Teleostei
- Order: Siluriformes
- Family: Ariidae
- Genus: Galeichthys
- Species: G. ater

Binomial name
- Galeichthys ater Castelnau, 1861

Species of fish

Galeichthys ater, the black sea catfish, is a species of sea catfish found in South Africa and Namibia. It grows to a length of about 45.0 cm (17.7 in) TL and feeds on benthic organisms with annelid worms making up a significant portion of their diet. They are a minor component of the fishery industry.
