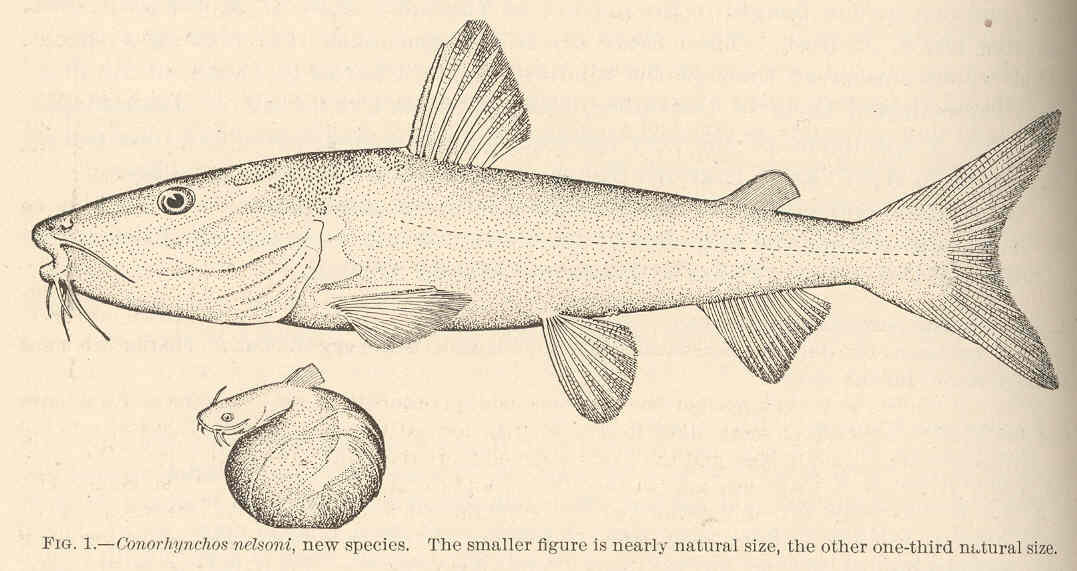

Conservation status
- Least Concern (IUCN 3.1)

Scientific classification
- Kingdom: Animalia
- Phylum: Chordata
- Class: Actinopterygii
- Order: Siluriformes
- Family: Ariidae
- Genus: Potamarius
- Species: P. nelsoni

Binomial name
- Potamarius nelsoni (Evermann & Goldsborough, 1902)

Synonyms
- Arius nelsoni (Evermann & Goldsborough, 1902); Conorhynchos nelsoni Evermann & Goldsborough, 1902

= Lacandon sea catfish =

Species of fish

The Lacandon sea catfish (Potamarius nelsoni) is a species of catfish in the family Ariidae. It was described by Barton Warren Evermann and Edmund Lee Goldsborough in 1902, originally under the genus Conorhynchos. It is known from the Usumacinta River, in Mexico. It reaches a maximum standard length of 39 cm (15 in).
