= Bleekeriella =

Conservation status
- Least Concern (IUCN 3.1)

Scientific classification
- Kingdom: Animalia
- Phylum: Chordata
- Class: Actinopterygii
- Order: Siluriformes
- Family: Ariidae
- Genus: Bleekeriella; Marceniuk, Oliveira & Ferraris, 2023
- Species: B. leptaspis

Binomial name
- Bleekeriella leptaspis (Bleeker, 1862)

Synonyms
- Ariopsis leptaspis (Bleeker, 1862); Arius leptaspis (Bleeker, 1862); Neoarius leptaspis (Bleeker, 1862); Hexanematichthys leptaspis Bleeker, 1862

Species of catfish

Bleekeriella leptaspis, the triangular shield catfish, boofhead catfish, freshwater forked tailed catfish, salmon catfish, or lesser salmon catfish, is a monospecific genus of catfish in the family Ariidae. It was described by Pieter Bleeker in 1862, originally under the genus Hexanematichthys. It inhabits marine, brackish and freshwaters in Australia and New Guinea, at a maximum known depth of 135 m (440 ft). It reaches a maximum standard length of 60 cm (24 in).

The generic name honours Dutch ichthýologist Pieter Bleeker.

It is the only member of the monospecific genus Bleekeriella.

The diet of the triangular shield catfish includes insects, mollusks, prawns, finfish and aquatic plants. It is preyed upon by fish such as Scleropages jardinii and the barramundi, and snakes in the species Acrochordus arafurae.

The triangular shield catfish breeds between September and January.
