= Genidens machadoi =

Scientific classification
- Kingdom: Animalia
- Phylum: Chordata
- Class: Actinopterygii
- Division: Teleostei
- Order: Siluriformes
- Family: Ariidae
- Genus: Genidens
- Species: G. machadoi

Binomial name
- Genidens machadoi (Miranda-Ribeiro, 1918)

Synonyms
- Tachysurus machadoi Miranda Ribeiro, 1918; Tachysurus mochadoi Miranda Ribeiro, 1918

Species of fish

Genidens machadoi is a species of catfish in the family Ariidae. It was described by Alípio de Miranda-Ribeiro in 1918, originally under the genus Tachysurus. It inhabits rivers along the south Atlantic coast in Argentina, Uruguay and Brazil. It reaches a total length of 80 cm (31 in).
