= Cryptarius daugueti =

Scientific classification
- Kingdom: Animalia
- Phylum: Chordata
- Class: Actinopterygii
- Order: Siluriformes
- Family: Ariidae
- Genus: Cryptarius
- Species: C. daugueti

Binomial name
- Cryptarius daugueti (Chevey, 1932)

Species of fish

Cryptarius daugueti is a species of sea catfish from the Mekong River basin which inhabits large rivers. It is found in brackish and fresh waters of Cambodia and Vietnam. This species has a maximum length of 26 centimetres (10 in) TL.

== Etymology ==
The catfish is named in honor of Paul Dauguet (1883–?), a French merchant seaman and the commander of the research vessel De Lanessan from which the holotype was collected.
