= Henni =

Henni may refer to:

== People ==
- Henni Forchhammer (1863–1955), Danish educator, feminist and peace activist
- Henni Lehmann (1862–1937), politically and socially active German painter
- Henni Zuël (born 1990), English golfer
- John Henni (1805–1881), Swiss-born Milwaukee Catholic prelate
- Lisa Henni (born 1982), Swedish actress
- Mohamed Henni (born 1989), French YouTuber

== Places ==
- Bou Henni, Algeria
- Henni Hall, part of Saint Francis de Sales Seminary

== Species ==
- Arius henni
- Phenacobrycon henni
