= Guinean sea catfish =

Scientific classification
- Domain: Eukaryota
- Kingdom: Animalia
- Phylum: Chordata
- Class: Actinopterygii
- Order: Siluriformes
- Family: Ariidae
- Genus: Carlarius
- Species: C. parkii

Binomial name
- Carlarius parkii (Günther, 1864)

Synonyms
- Arius parkii Günther, 1864; Tachysurus gambensis (Bowdich, 1825); Arius capellonis Steindachner, 1867; Tachysurus capellonis (Steindachner, 1867); Tachysurus capellonsis (Steindachner, 1867); Arius granulatus Peters, 1868

Species of fish

The Guinean sea catfish (Carlarius parkii), also known as the marine catfish, is a species of sea catfish in the family Ariidae. It was described by Albert Günther in 1864, originally under the genus Arius. It is a tropical fish which is found in the eastern Atlantic off Mauritania, Angola, Morocco and Western Sahara. A single record was reported in the eastern Mediterranean Sea in 1986. It inhabits coastal marine waters at a depth range of 50 to 80 m (160 to 260 ft), also frequently entering estuaries and freshwater rivers. It reaches a maximum total length of 70 cm (28 in), more commonly reaching a TL of 40 cm (16 in).

The Guinean sea catfish feeds on bony fish and shrimp. It is of commercial interest to fisheries, although a venom in the serrated spines of its dorsal and pectoral regions can cause painful injuries.

Male Guinean sea catfish orally incubate eggs.
