= Arafura catfish =

Scientific classification
- Domain: Eukaryota
- Kingdom: Animalia
- Phylum: Chordata
- Class: Actinopterygii
- Order: Siluriformes
- Family: Ariidae
- Genus: Pararius
- Species: P. proximus

Binomial name
- Pararius proximus (J. D. Ogilby, 1898)

Synonyms
- Arius arafurensis Hardenberg, 1948; Arius proximus Ogilby, 1898; Netuma proxima (Ogilby, 1898); Netuma proximus (Ogilby, 1898); Netuna proximus (Ogilby, 1898)

Species of catfish

The Arafura catfish (Pararius proximus), also known as the Arafura sea catfish, is a species of catfish in the family Ariidae. It was described by James Douglas Ogilby in 1898, originally under the genus Arius. It inhabits marine, brackish and freshwaters in the western Pacific. It reaches a maximum standard length of 46 cm (18 in).

The diet of the Arafura catfish includes worms, finfish, crustaceans such as crabs and amphipods, molluscs, echinoderms, algae and insects.
