= Cinetodus froggatti =

Conservation status
- Least Concern (IUCN 3.1)

Scientific classification
- Kingdom: Animalia
- Phylum: Chordata
- Class: Actinopterygii
- Order: Siluriformes
- Family: Ariidae
- Genus: Cinetodus
- Species: C. froggatti

Binomial name
- Cinetodus froggatti (E. P. Ramsay & J. D. Ogilby, 1887)

Synonyms
- Arius froggatti Ramsay & Ogilby, 1886; Septobranchus johannae Hardenberg, 1941

Species of fish

Cinetodus froggatti, known as Froggatt's catfish or smallmouthed salmon catfish, is a species of sea catfish found in West Papua in Indonesia and Papua New Guinea where it is found in the Purari, Fly, Strickland and Digul River systems as well as in the Roper River system of the Northern Territory in Australia.
