= Galeichthys trowi =

Scientific classification
- Domain: Eukaryota
- Kingdom: Animalia
- Phylum: Chordata
- Class: Actinopterygii
- Order: Siluriformes
- Family: Ariidae
- Genus: Galeichthys
- Species: G. trowi

Binomial name
- Galeichthys trowi Kulongowski, 2010

Species of fish

Galeichthys trowi is a species of catfish in the family Ariidae. It was described by Cynthia Kulongowski in 2010. It is a tropical, marine catfish which is endemic to the coast of South Africa's KwaZulu-Natal province. It reaches a standard length of 50 cm (20 in).

The species epithet "trowi" refers to a student named Eugene Trow Jr., cited as studying the South African catfish of the genus Galeichthys.
