= Roughback sea catfish =

Scientific classification
- Kingdom: Animalia
- Phylum: Chordata
- Class: Actinopterygii
- Order: Siluriformes
- Family: Ariidae
- Genus: Plicofollis
- Species: P. tonggol

Binomial name
- Plicofollis tonggol (Bleeker, 1846)

Synonyms
- Arius crossocheilos Bleeker, 1846; Arius crossocheilus Bleeker, 1846; Arius tonggol Bleeker, 1846; Tachysurus crossocheilus (Bleeker, 1846)

Species of fish

The roughback sea catfish (Plicofollis tonggol) is a species of sea catfish known as manyung in Indonesia and arahan in the Philippines, where it is regarded important in the fishing industry. As food, roughback sea catfish are sun-dried and salted before actual trade and consumption.

== Characteristics ==
The roughback sea catfish grows up to 40 cm long. They live in the salty waters of tropical regions of the world. They feed on invertebrates. They have pointed dorsal fins, which can cause injury if held by unprotected human hands.

== Distribution ==
They are found at the coastal waters of Indonesia, Malaysia, the Philippines, and Pakistan.
