= Bronze catfish =

Conservation status
- Least Concern (IUCN 3.1)

Scientific classification
- Kingdom: Animalia
- Phylum: Chordata
- Class: Actinopterygii
- Order: Siluriformes
- Family: Ariidae
- Genus: Netuma
- Species: N. bilineata

Binomial name
- Netuma bilineata (Valenciennes, 1840)

Synonyms
- Arius bilineatus (Valenciennes, 1840); Arius andamanensis Day, 1871; Arius serratus Day, 1877; Arius dayi Dmitrenko, 1974; Bagrus bilineatus Valenciennes, 1840; Bagrus rhodonotus Bleeker, 1846; Netuma bilineatus (Valenciennes, 1840); Netuna bilineata (Valenciennes, 1840); Netuma osakae Jordan & Kasawa, 1925

Species of catfish

The bronze catfish (Netuma bilineata), also known as the giant catfish, the roundsnout sea catfish, or the two-line sea catfish, is a species of catfish in the family Ariidae. It was described by Achille Valenciennes in 1840, originally under the genus Bagrus. It inhabits marine, brackish and freshwaters throughout the Indo-western Pacific. It reaches a maximum standard length of 62 cm (24 in).

The diet of the bronze catfish includes detritus such as loose scales and carcasses, as well as prawns and other crustaceans, and sea urchins.

The bronze catfish is of minor interest to commercial fisheries.
