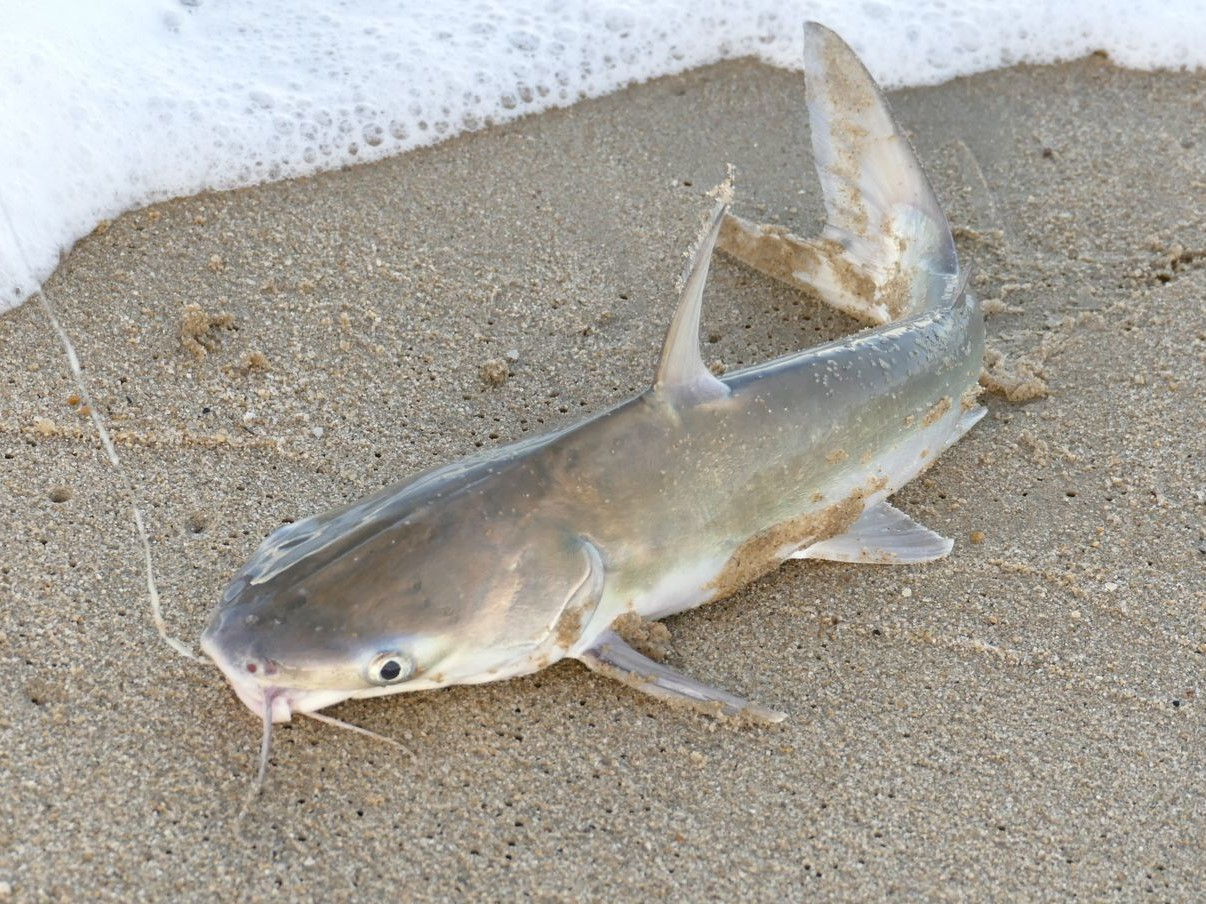

Scientific classification
- Kingdom: Animalia
- Phylum: Chordata
- Class: Actinopterygii
- Order: Siluriformes
- Family: Ariidae
- Genus: Plicofollis
- Species: P. argyropleuron

Binomial name
- Plicofollis argyropleuron (Valenciennes, 1840)

Synonyms
- Arius acutus Bleeker, 1846; Arius argyropleuron Valenciennes, 1840; Arius colcloughi (Ogilby, 1910); Arius hamiltonis Bleeker, 1846; Arius macrocephalus Bleeker, 1846; Arius schlegeli Bleeker, 1863; Hemipimelodus colcloughi Ogilby, 1910; Tachysurus argyropleuron (Valenciennes, 1840); Tachysurus broadbenti Ogilby, 1908; Trachysurus broadbenti Ogilby, 1908

= Longsnouted catfish =

Species of fish

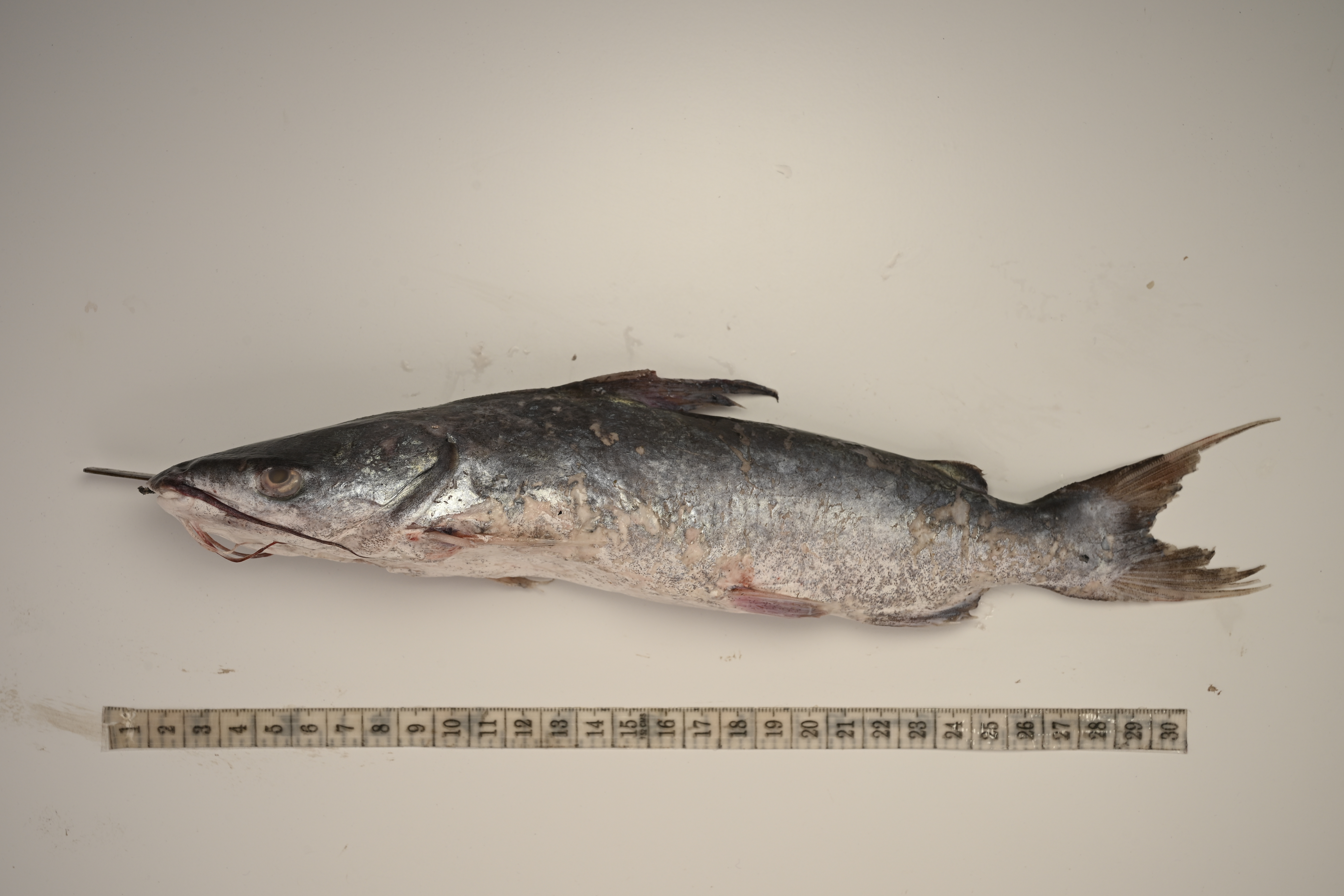
Plicofollis argyropleuron

The longsnouted catfish (Plicofollis argyropleuron), also known as Broadbent's catfish, spoon-nosed catfish, large-scaled catfish, sharp-headed catfish, and sand catfish, is a species of catfish in the family Ariidae. It was first described by Achille Valenciennes in 1840, originally under the genus Arius. It inhabits brackish and marine waters in New Guinea, Australia, and southern and south-eastern Asia. It reaches a maximum total length of 50 cm (20 in).

The diet of the longsnouted catfish includes bony fish, benthic crustaceans including crabs and prawns, detritus, mollusks, polychaete and annelid worms, algae and mud.
