= Potamarius izabalensis =

Scientific classification
- Kingdom: Animalia
- Phylum: Chordata
- Class: Actinopterygii
- Order: Siluriformes
- Family: Ariidae
- Genus: Potamarius
- Species: P. izabalensis

Binomial name
- Potamarius izabalensis Hubbs & Miller, 1960

Synonyms
- Arius izabalensis (Hubbs & Miller, 1960); Arius izabellensis (Hubbs & Miller, 1960)

Species of fish

Potamarius izabalensis is a species of catfish in the family Ariidae. It was described by Carl Leavitt Hubbs and Robert Rush Miller in 1960, originally under the genus Arius. It is known to inhabit Izabal Lake in Guatemala, and possibly also inhabits the Polochic River. It reaches a maximum standard length of 44 cm (17 in).
