= Usumacinta sea catfish =

Conservation status
- Data Deficient (IUCN 3.1)

Scientific classification
- Kingdom: Animalia
- Phylum: Chordata
- Class: Actinopterygii
- Order: Siluriformes
- Family: Ariidae
- Genus: Potamarius
- Species: P. usumacintae

Binomial name
- Potamarius usumacintae Betancur-R. & Willink, 2007

Species of fish

The Usumacinta sea catfish (Potamarius usumacintae) is a species of catfish in the family Ariidae. It was described by Ricardo Betancur-Rodríguez and Philip W. Willink in 2007. It is endemic to the Usumacinta River between Mexico and Guatemala. It reaches a maximum standard length of 59.5 cm (23.4 in).

== Etymology ==
The species epithet "usumacintae" refers to the Usumacinta River.
