= Netuma patriciae =

Whipfin sea catfish

Scientific classification
- Kingdom: Animalia
- Phylum: Chordata
- Class: Actinopterygii
- Order: Siluriformes
- Family: Ariidae
- Genus: Netuma
- Species: N. patriciae

Binomial name
- Netuma patriciae Y. Takahashi, Seishi Kimura & Motomura, 2019

Species of fish

Netuma patriciae, the whipfin sea catfish, is a species of catfish in the family Ariidae found in the Western Pacific Ocean from the Philippines.

== Size ==
This species reaches a length of 30.3 cm (11.9 in).

== Etymology ==
The fish is named in honor of Patricia J. Kailola, of The University of the South Pacific in Suva, Fiji, because of her research on ariid catfishes.
