= Carlarius heudelotii =

Scientific classification
- Kingdom: Animalia
- Phylum: Chordata
- Class: Actinopterygii
- Order: Siluriformes
- Family: Ariidae
- Genus: Carlarius
- Species: C. heudelotii

Binomial name
- Carlarius heudelotii (Valenciennes, 1840)

Synonyms
- Bagrus goreensis Guichenot, 1858; Arius heudelotii Valenciennes, 1840; Tachysurus heudelotii (Valenciennes, 1840); Arius mercatoris Poll, 1949; Tachysurus mercatoris (Poll, 1949)

Species of fish

Carlarius heudelotii, the smoothmouth sea catfish, is a species of sea catfish.

== Location ==
It occurs along the western coast of Africa from Mauritania to Gabon or Angola. While mostly a marine species occurring on the continental shelf, it has also been reported from the Niger basin and the Benoué and Gambia Rivers.

== Biology ==
The smoothmouth sea catfish stays buried in the mud and feeds on invertebrates and occasionally leaves the bottom to feed on open prey. These fish have rays on their fins which are known to be very venomous and painful if a wound is inflicted. The female in this species bear large eggs.

== Size ==
The maximum published weight of the smoothmouth sea catfish is 8,500 g.
