= Thinspine sea catfish =

Scientific classification
- Kingdom: Animalia
- Phylum: Chordata
- Class: Actinopterygii
- Division: Teleostei
- Order: Siluriformes
- Family: Ariidae
- Genus: Plicofollis
- Species: P. layardi

Binomial name
- Plicofollis layardi (Günther, 1866)

Synonyms
- Arius layardi Günther, 1866; Arius tenuispinis Day, 1877; Arius tennuispinis Day, 1877; Arius satparanus Chaudhuri, 1916; Hemipimelodus tenuispinis (Day, 1877); Netuma tenuispinus (Day, 1877); Plicofollis tenuispinis (Day, 1877); Tachysurus tenuispinis (Day, 1877); Tachysurus satparanus (Chaudhuri, 1916)

Species of fish

The thinspine sea catfish (Plicofollis layardi), also known as the Day's catfish, is a species of catfish in the family Ariidae. It was described by Francis Day in 1866, originally under the genus Arius. It inhabits brackish and coastal marine waters in Mozambique, Sri Lanka, and the Persian Gulf. It dwells at a depth range of 20 to 50 m (66 to 164 ft). It reaches a maximum total length of 36 cm (14 in), more commonly reaching a TL of 23 cm (9.1 in).

The diet of the thinspine sea catfish includes bony fish and benthic invertebrates. It is of minor value to commercial fisheries.
