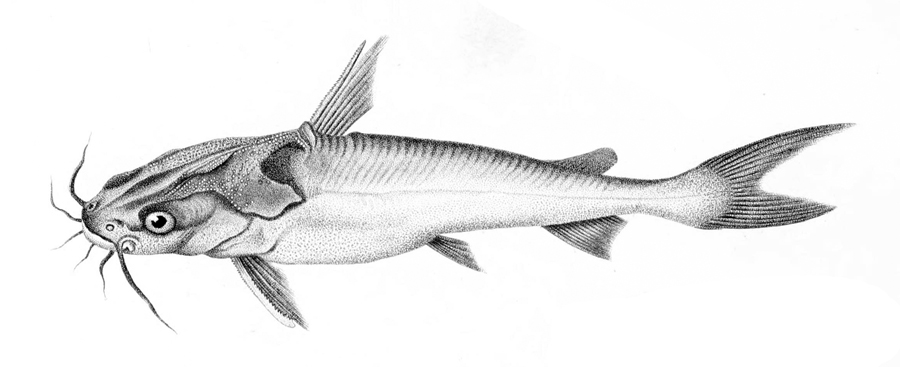

Conservation status
- Least Concern (IUCN 3.1)

Scientific classification
- Kingdom: Animalia
- Phylum: Chordata
- Class: Actinopterygii
- Order: Siluriformes
- Family: Ariidae
- Genus: Genidens
- Species: G. genidens

Binomial name
- Genidens genidens (Cuvier, 1829)

Synonyms
- Pimelodus genidens Cuvier, 1829; Bagrus genidens (Cuvier, 1829); Genidens cuvieri Castelnau, 1855; Genidens granulosus Castelnau, 1855; Genidens valenciennesii Bleeker, 1858

= Genidens genidens =

Species of fish

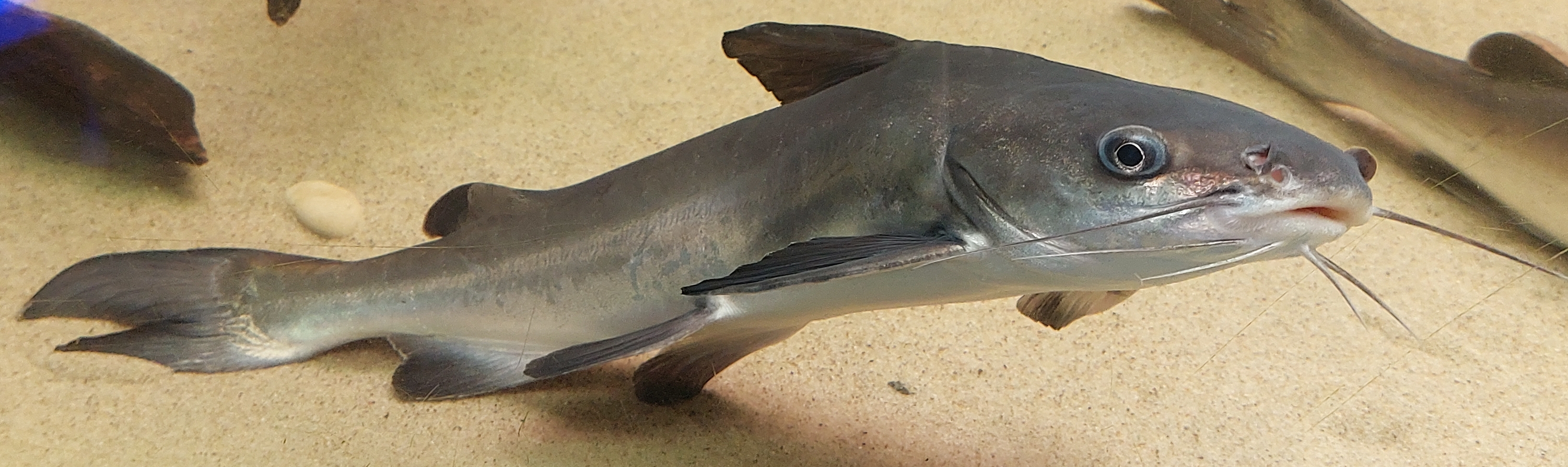
Genidens genidens

Genidens genidens, the Guri sea catfish or marine catfish, is a species of catfish in the family Ariidae. It was described by Georges Cuvier in 1829, originally under the genus Pimelodus. It is known from southern South American rivers connected to the Atlantic Ocean. It is known to reach a total length of 42.5 cm (16.7 in), but more commonly reaches a TL of 35 cm (14 in). It has been recorded spawning between Autumn and Spring. Its diet includes polychaete worms, plants, finfish, mollusks, and benthic crustaceans.

The Guri sea catfish is rated as Least Concern by the IUCN redlist.
