= Galeichthys peruvianus =

Conservation status
- Least Concern (IUCN 3.1)

Scientific classification
- Kingdom: Animalia
- Phylum: Chordata
- Class: Actinopterygii
- Order: Siluriformes
- Family: Ariidae
- Genus: Galeichthys
- Species: G. peruvianus

Binomial name
- Galeichthys peruvianus Lütken, 1874

Species of fish

Galeichthys peruvianus is a species of sea catfish that is found in the Pacific Ocean off the coast of Peru and far northern Chile. They reach a length of 35 cm (14 in). They are a component of commercial fisheries for human consumption. As with many species in this family, the dorsal fin spines are venomous and any wounds inflicted by them warrant prompt treatment.
