= Flatmouth sea catfish =

Scientific classification
- Kingdom: Animalia
- Phylum: Chordata
- Class: Actinopterygii
- Order: Siluriformes
- Family: Ariidae
- Genus: Plicofollis
- Species: P. platystomus

Binomial name
- Plicofollis platystomus (F. Day, 1877)

Synonyms
- Arius platystomus Day, 1877; Tachysurus platystomus (Day, 1877)

Species of fish

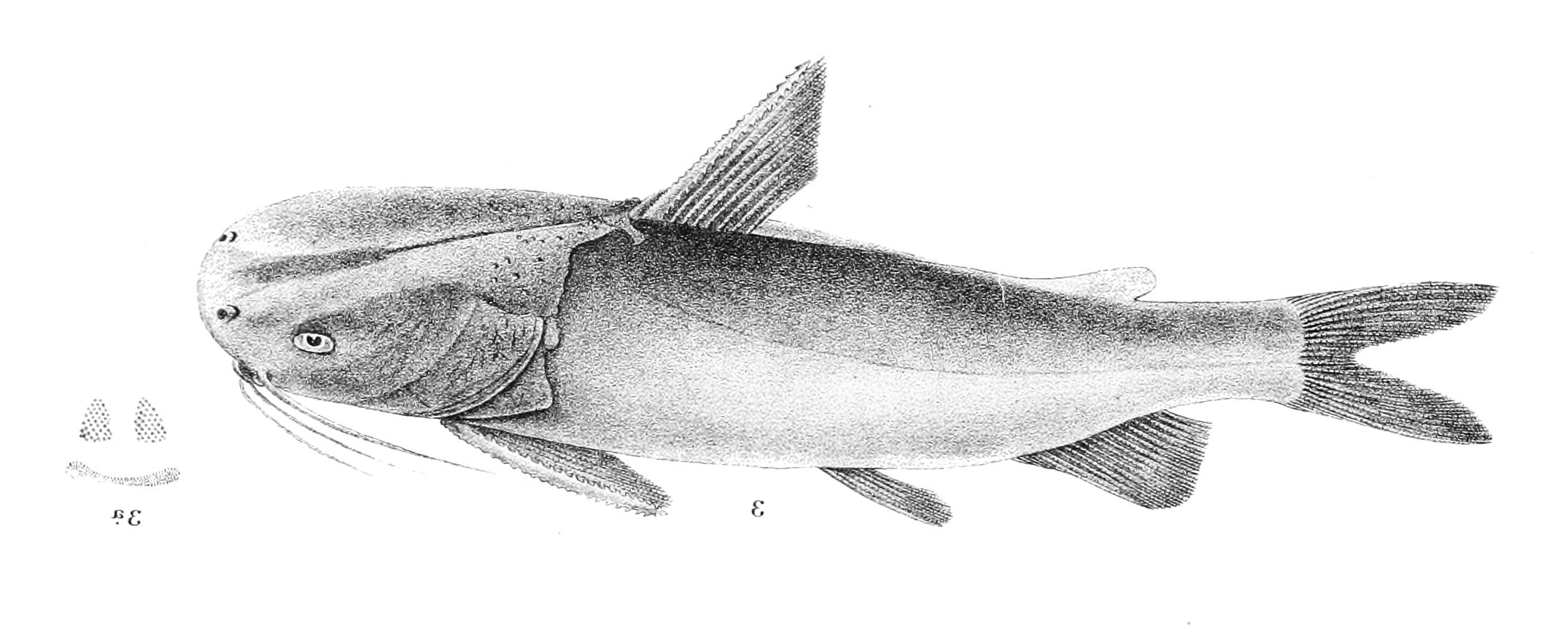
Plicofollis platystomus

The flatmouth sea catfish (Plicofollis platystomus), also known as the flat-mouthed catfish or the flatmouth catfish, is a species of catfish in the family Ariidae. It was described by Francis Day in 1877, originally under the genus Arius. It inhabits estuaries and coastal marine waters in India, Myanmar, Bangladesh, Sri Lanka, and Pakistan. It dwells at a maximum depth of 50 m (160 ft). It reaches a maximum total length of 31 cm (12 in).

The diet of the flatmouth sea catfish consists of benthic invertebrates. It is considered an important foodfish, and its meat is marketed fresh. Due to a lack of known significant threats to its population, it is currently ranked as Least Concern by the IUCN redlist.
