= Threadfin catfish =

Scientific classification
- Kingdom: Animalia
- Phylum: Chordata
- Class: Actinopterygii
- Order: Siluriformes
- Family: Ariidae
- Genus: Nemapteryx
- Species: N. armiger

Binomial name
- Nemapteryx armiger (De Vis, 1884)

Synonyms
- Arius armiger De Vis, 1884; Arius stirlingi Ogilby, 1898

Species of fish

The threadfin catfish, also known as the copper catfish or the northern pout, (Nemapteryx armiger) is a species of catfish in the family Ariidae. It was described by Charles Walter De Vis in 1884, originally under the genus Arius. It is found in rivers and marine waters in Australia and New Guinea. It reaches a maximum standard length of 39.5 cm (15.6 in). Its diet consists of benthic crustaceans including prawns and crabs, as well as worms, mollusks and finfish.
