= Papuarius latirostris =

Conservation status
- Least Concern (IUCN 3.1)

Scientific classification
- Kingdom: Animalia
- Phylum: Chordata
- Class: Actinopterygii
- Order: Siluriformes
- Family: Ariidae
- Genus: Papuarius; Marceniuk, Oliveira & Ferraris, 2023
- Species: P. latirostris

Binomial name
- Papuarius latirostris (W. J. Macleay, 1883)

Synonyms
- Arius acrocephalus Weber, 1913; Arius latirostris Macleay, 1883; Neoarius latirostris (Macleay, 1883); Potamosilurus latirostris (Macleay, 1883); Arius digulensis Hardenberg, 1936

Species of catfish

Papuarius latirostris, the broad-snouted catfish, is a species of catfish in the family Ariidae. It was described by William John Macleay in 1883, originally under the genus Arius. It inhabits freshwater rivers in Indonesia and Papua New Guinea. Its diet includes finfish, mollusks, prawns, terrestrial arthropods, aquatic insects, and plants. It reaches a maximum standard length of 50 cm (20 in).

The IUCN redlist currently lists the broad-snouted catfish as Least Concern, but makes note of a present decline in the species' population. It cites fishing/harvesting, mining, quarrying, and residential developments as the main threats to the species.
