= Potamosilurus =

Scientific classification
- Kingdom: Animalia
- Phylum: Chordata
- Class: Actinopterygii
- Order: Siluriformes
- Family: Ariidae
- Genus: Potamosilurus; Marceniuk & Menezes, 2007

Type species
- Potamosilurus macrorhynchus (Weber, 1913)

Genus of fishes

Potamosilurus is a genus of freshwater sea catfishes found on the island of New Guinea. There are currently four described species.

== Species ==
- Potamosilurus coatesi (Kailola, 1990) (Coates' catfish)
- Potamosilurus macrorhynchus (Weber, 1913) (Sharp-nosed catfish)
- Potamosilurus taylori (Roberts, 1978) (Taylor's catfish)
- Potamosilurus velutinus (Weber, 1907) (Papillate catfish)
