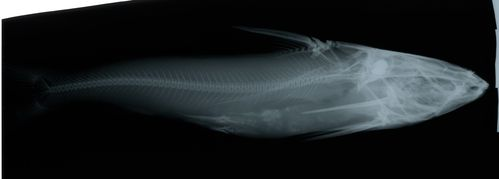
- X-Ray image of Carlarius heudelotii

Scientific classification
- Kingdom: Animalia
- Phylum: Chordata
- Class: Actinopterygii
- Order: Siluriformes
- Family: Ariidae
- Subfamily: Ariinae
- Genus: Carlarius; Marceniuk & Menezes, 2007

Type species
- Carlarius heudelotii (Valenciennes, 1840)

Species
- See text.

= Carlarius =

Genus of fishes

Carlarius is a genus of catfishes (order Siluriformes) of the family Ariidae.

== Species ==
- Carlarius gigas (Boulenger, 1911) (giant sea catfish)
- Carlarius heudelotii (Valenciennes, 1840) (smoothmouth sea catfish)
- Carlarius latiscutatus (Günther, 1864) (rough-head sea catfish)
- Carlarius parkii (Günther, 1864) (Guinean sea catfish)
