= Paragenidens =

Conservation status
- Least Concern (IUCN 3.1)

Scientific classification
- Kingdom: Animalia
- Phylum: Chordata
- Class: Actinopterygii
- Order: Siluriformes
- Family: Ariidae
- Subfamily: Ariinae
- Genus: Paragenidens; Marceniuk et al., 2019
- Species: P. grandoculis

Binomial name
- Paragenidens grandoculis (Steindachner, 1877)

Genus of fishes

Paragenidens is a monotypic genus of sea catfishes containing just one species, Paragenidens grandoculis. This species was formerly classified under the genus Potamarius until a 2019 study found it to be wholly distinct from it. It is endemic to Brazil, where it is known from the Paraíba do Sul and the Doce Rivers and their mouths. It is highly endangered and was not seen for over 50 years until it was rediscovered during fieldwork for the 2019 study that reclassified it. It is now only known from Lagoa Nova in the municipality of Linhares in Espírito Santo state, having been extirpated from its only other recent locality, Juparanã Lagoon in Linhares.
