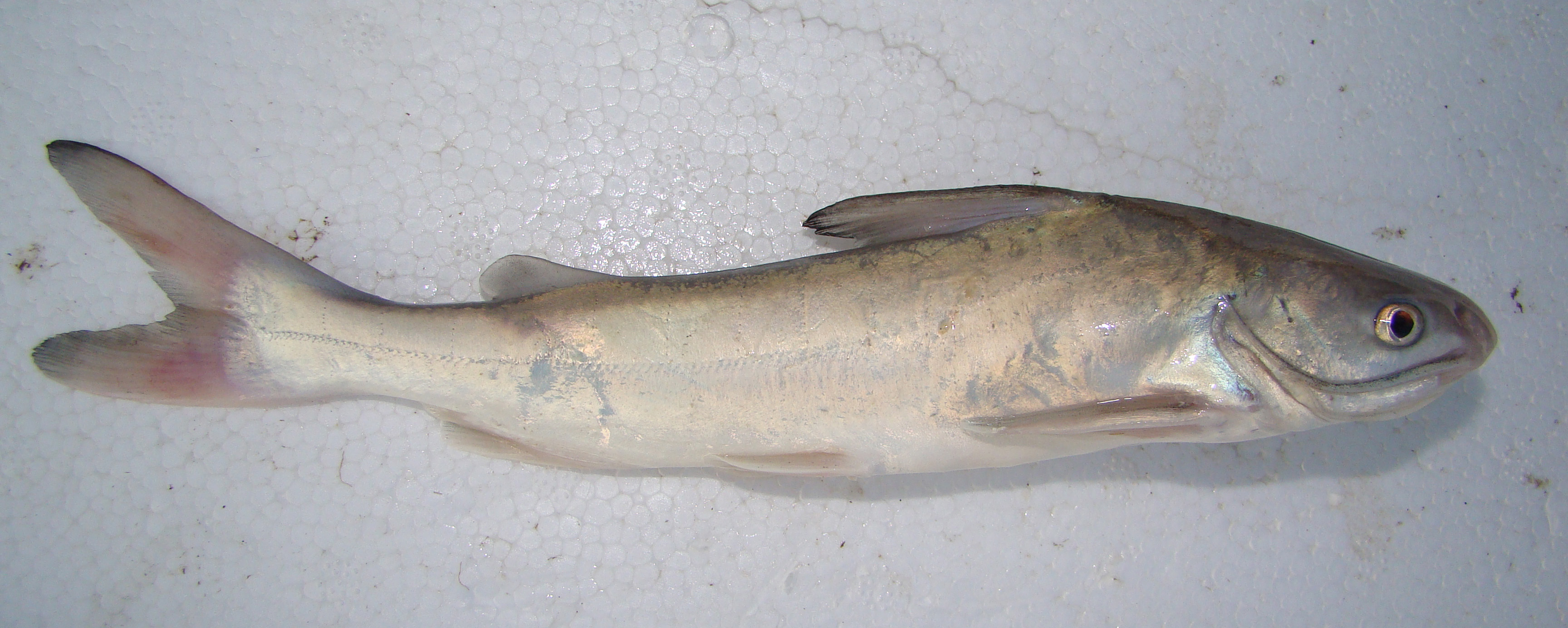
- Genidens genidens

Scientific classification
- Kingdom: Animalia
- Phylum: Chordata
- Class: Actinopterygii
- Order: Siluriformes
- Family: Ariidae
- Subfamily: Ariinae
- Genus: Genidens; Castelnau, 1855

Type species
- Bagrus genidens Cuvier, 1829

= Genidens =

Genus of fishes

Genidens is a genus of sea catfishes found along the Atlantic coast of South America. There are currently four recognized species in this genus.

== Species ==
- Genidens barbus (Lacépède, 1803) (white sea-catfish)
- Genidens genidens (G. Cuvier, 1829) (Guri sea-catfish)
- Genidens machadoi (A. Miranda-Ribeiro, 1918)
- Genidens planifrons (H. Higuchi, E. G. Reis & F. G. Araújo, 1982)
