= Aceroichthys =

Scientific classification
- Kingdom: Animalia
- Phylum: Chordata
- Class: Actinopterygii
- Order: Siluriformes
- Family: Ariidae
- Genus: Aceroichthys; Marceniuk, Oliveira & Ferraris, 2023
- Species: A. dioctes

Binomial name
- Aceroichthys dioctes (Kailola, 2000)

Synonyms
- Arius dioctes Kailola, 2000; Cochlefelis dioctes (Kailola, 2000); Hemiarius dioctes (Kailola, 2000)

Species of fish

The warrior catfish (Aceroichthys dioctes) is a species of catfish in the family Ariidae. It was described by Patricia J. Kailola in 2000, originally under the genus Arius. It inhabits marine and freshwaters in New Guinea and Australia. It reaches a standard length of 120 cm (47 in), and a maximum weight of 19 kg (42 lb).

The species epithet "dioctes", derived from Ancient Greek, refers to the species' hunting qualities. The generic name honours Colombian ichthýologist Arturo Acero Pizarro.

It is the only member of the monospecific genus Aceroichthys.
