= Short barbelled catfish =

Conservation status
- Least Concern (IUCN 3.1)

Scientific classification
- Kingdom: Animalia
- Phylum: Chordata
- Class: Actinopterygii
- Order: Siluriformes
- Family: Ariidae
- Genus: Megalosciades; Marceniuk, Oliveira & Ferraris, 2023
- Species: M. augustus

Binomial name
- Megalosciades augustus (Roberts, 1978)

Synonyms
- Arius augustus Roberts, 1978; Nemapteryx augusta (Roberts, 1978)

Species of fish

The short barbelled catfish (Megalosciades augustus) is a species of catfish in the family Ariidae. It was described by Tyson R. Roberts in 1978, originally under the genus Arius. It inhabits the Fly River in Papua New Guinea. It reaches a maximum standard length of 60 cm (24 in). Its diet consists of bony fish in the families Chanidae, Clupeidae and Melanotaeniidae.
