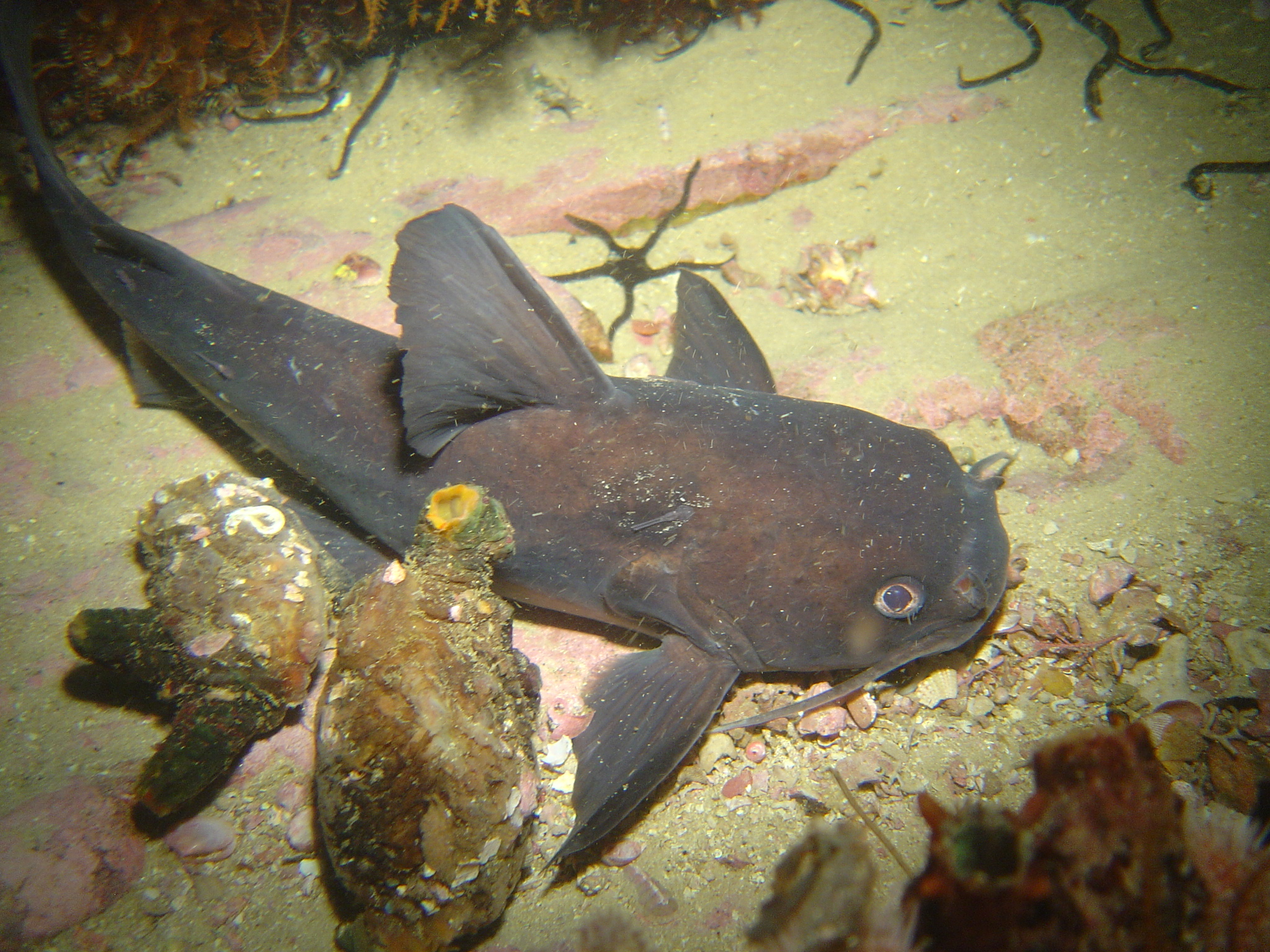
- Galeichthys feliceps

Scientific classification
- Kingdom: Animalia
- Phylum: Chordata
- Class: Actinopterygii
- Order: Siluriformes
- Family: Ariidae
- Subfamily: Galeichthyinae; Acero & Betancur-R., 2007
- Genus: Galeichthys; Valenciennes in G. Cuvier & Valenciennes, 1840

Type species
- Galeichthys feliceps Valenciennes, 1840

= Galeichthys =

Genus of fishes

Galeichthys is a genus of sea catfishes in the family Ariidae, the only genus in the subfamily Galeichthyinae. It includes four predominantly marine species distributed in Southern Africa and northwestern South America:

- Galeichthys ater Castelnau, 1861 (Black sea catfish)
- Galeichthys feliceps Valenciennes, 1840 (White barbel), the type species
- Galeichthys peruvianus Lütken, 1874 (Peruvian sea catfish)
- Galeichthys trowi Kulongowski, 2010

Those fish have three pairs of barbels: a pair of fleshy and cylindrical maxillary barbels and two pairs of mental barbels. The base of the adipose fin is as long as the base of the anal fin.

The name Galeichthys comes from Greek galeos 'shark' and ichthys 'fish'.

The distribution of Galeichthys in southern South America and southern Africa may owe to an ancestor that inhabited the southern coast of West Gondwana during the Early Cretaceous.
