= Cryptarius =

Scientific classification
- Kingdom: Animalia
- Phylum: Chordata
- Class: Actinopterygii
- Order: Siluriformes
- Family: Ariidae
- Subfamily: Ariinae
- Genus: Cryptarius; Kailola, 2004

Type species
- Arius truncatus Valenciennes, 1840

Genus of fishes

Cryptarius is a genus of catfishes (order Siluriformes) of the family Ariidae. It includes two species, C. daugeti and C. truncatus. Cryptarius species originate from brackish waters of south and southeast Asia.

C. daugeti originates from the Mekong River basin and inhabits large rivers. It is found in brackish and fresh waters of Cambodia and Vietnam. This species has a maximum length of 26 centimetres (10 in) TL.

C. truncatus originates from estuaries and lower courses of rivers from the Chao Phraya to Sumatra and Java, including the lower Mekong. It inhabits brackish waters of Thailand, Cambodia, Indonesia, and Malaysia. This species has a maximum length of 42 cm (17 in) in length. This fish species feeds on fishes and crustaceans. C. truncatus is marketed fresh.

== Species ==
- Cryptarius daugueti (Chevey, 1932)
- Cryptarius truncatus (Valenciennes, 1840) (Spoonsnouted catfish)
