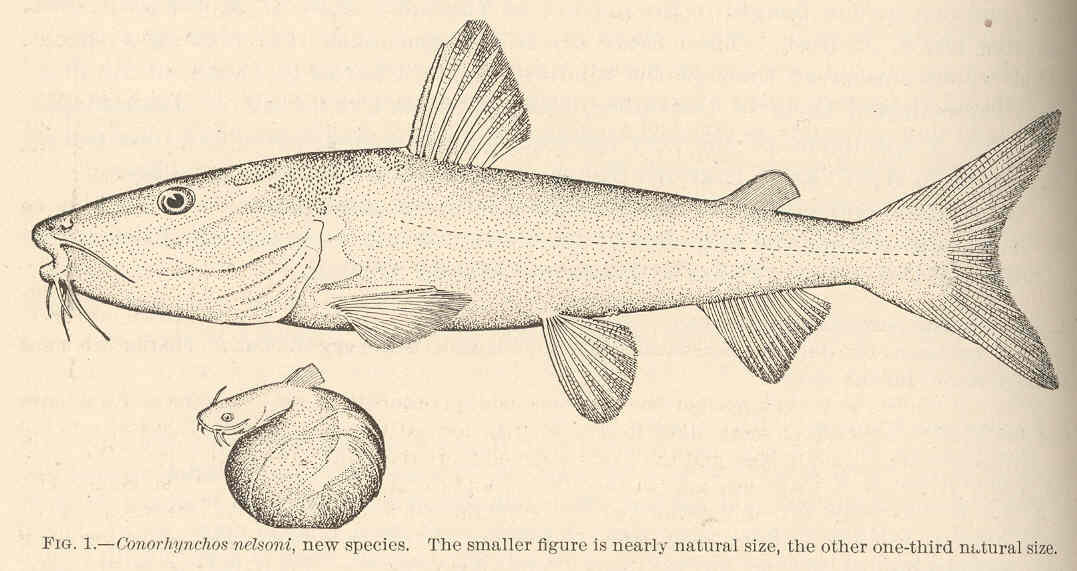
- Potamarius nelsoni

Scientific classification
- Kingdom: Animalia
- Phylum: Chordata
- Class: Actinopterygii
- Order: Siluriformes
- Family: Ariidae
- Subfamily: Ariinae
- Genus: Potamarius; C. L. Hubbs & R. R. Miller, 1960

Type species
- Conorhynchos nelsoni Evermann & Goldsborough 1902

Species
- See text for species.

= Potamarius =

Genus of fishes

Potamarius is a genus of sea catfishes. The three species in this genus exclusively inhabit fresh water in southern Mexico and Guatemala. The individual species have relatively small ranges. The highly endangered Paragenidens grandoculis of Brazil was long classified in Potamarius, but a 2019 study has found it to belong in its own genus.

== Species ==
There are currently three described species in this genus:

- Potamarius izabalensis C. L. Hubbs & R. R. Miller, 1960
- Potamarius nelsoni (Evermann & Goldsborough, 1902) (Lacandon sea-catfish)
- Potamarius usumacintae Betancur-R. & Willink, 2007 (Usumacinta sea-catfish)
