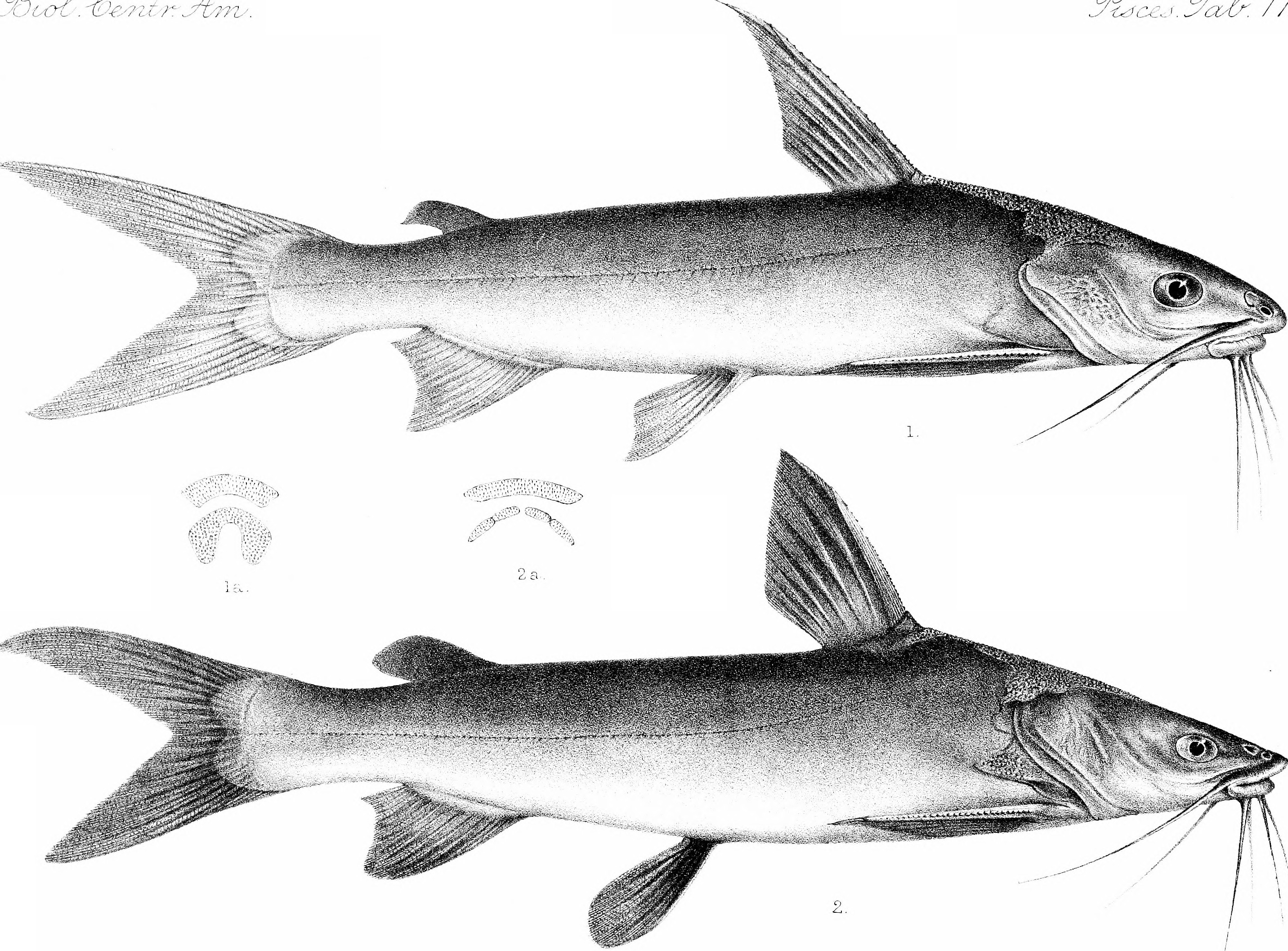
- 1. Occidentarius platypogon, 2. Ariopsis guatemalensis

Conservation status
- Least Concern (IUCN 3.1)

Scientific classification
- Kingdom: Animalia
- Phylum: Chordata
- Class: Actinopterygii
- Division: Teleostei
- Order: Siluriformes
- Family: Ariidae
- Genus: Occidentarius; Betancur-R. & Acero P., in Betancur-R. et al., 2007
- Species: O. platypogon

Binomial name
- Occidentarius platypogon (Günther, 1864)

Synonyms
- Arius platypogon Günther, 1864; Ariopsis platypogon (Günther, 1864); Galeichthys platypogon (Günther, 1864); Hexanematichthys platypogon (Günther, 1864); Netuma platypogon (Günther, 1864); Sciades platypogon (Günther, 1864); Tachisurus platypogon (Günther, 1864); Netuma mazatlana Gilbert, 1904

= Occidentarius =

Species of fish

Occidentarius platypogon, the combinate sea-catfish, is a species of sea catfish found in marine and brackish waters along the Pacific coast from Mexico to Peru. It is the only member of its genus. It is a very abundant fish of the continental shelf and is fished for human consumption. It grows to a length of 50 cm (20 in).
