= Spoon-snouted catfish =

Conservation status
- Data Deficient (IUCN 3.1)

Scientific classification
- Kingdom: Animalia
- Phylum: Chordata
- Class: Actinopterygii
- Order: Siluriformes
- Family: Ariidae
- Genus: Doiichthys
- Species: D. novaeguineae

Binomial name
- Doiichthys novaeguineae Weber, 1913

Synonyms
- Nedystoma novaeguineae (Weber, 1913)

Species of fish

The spoon-snouted catfish (Doiichthys novaeguineae) is a species of catfish in the family Ariidae. It was described by Max Carl Wilhelm Weber in 1913. It inhabits brackish and freshwaters in central-southern New Guinea. It reaches a maximum standard length of 15 cm (5.9 in).
