= List of fish species that protect their young =

Some species of fish will actively protect their eggs or young from predators.

== Mouthbrooding species ==
Some species gather up fertilized eggs in their mouth and keep them safe until they hatch, a process called mouthbrooding.

- Cichlid. In addition to being mouthbrooders, some species continue to protect their young after they hatch, calling out to them when there is danger, and letting them swim back into their mouth to hold them safely away.
- Apogonidae
- Ariidae males carry a clutch of a few dozen eggs in their mouths, for about two months before they hatch.
- Luciocephalus pulcher
- Jawfishes
- Osteoglossid are all mouthbrooders. The parents can hold hundreds of eggs in their mouths. Once hatched, the young may make several trips outside the parent's mouth before deciding to leave permanently. Some species also build nests and protect the young after they hatch.
- Gourami

== Other ==
- Suckermouth armored catfish males guard their mate's eggs until they hatch, and sometimes the larvae.
- Siamese fighting fish males build bubble nests and protect the eggs until they hatch.
