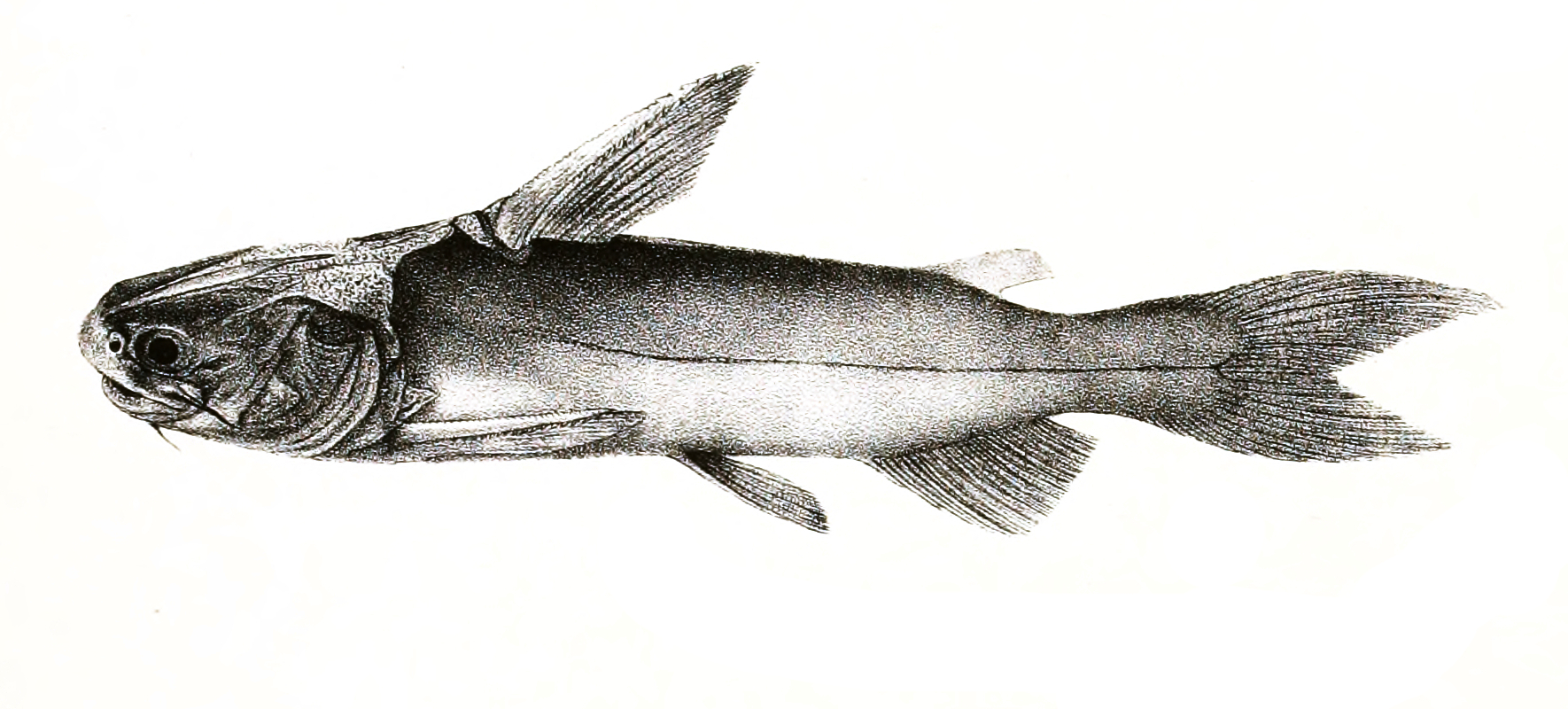

Scientific classification
- Kingdom: Animalia
- Phylum: Chordata
- Class: Actinopterygii
- Order: Siluriformes
- Family: Ariidae
- Genus: Ketengus; Bleeker, 1847
- Species: K. typus

Binomial name
- Ketengus typus Bleeker, 1847

Synonyms
- Pimelodus pectinidens Cantor, 1849

= Ketengus =

Genus of fishes

Ketengus typus, the bigmouth sea-catfish, is the only species in the sea catfish genus Ketengus (order Siluriformes).

This fish is found in South and Southeast Asia in India, Andaman Islands, Malaysia, Thailand, and Indonesia. It is distributed in the Eastern Bay of Bengal and Malay Peninsula in nearshore coastal waters, estuaries, and lower reaches of rivers. It lives mostly in brackish waters and rarely freshwaters.

Katengus typus feeds on scale of other fishes, invertebrates and small fishes. K. typus grows up to 25.0 centimetres TL.
