= Chinchaysuyoa labiata =

Conservation status
- Data Deficient (IUCN 3.1)

Scientific classification
- Kingdom: Animalia
- Phylum: Chordata
- Class: Actinopterygii
- Order: Siluriformes
- Family: Ariidae
- Genus: Chinchaysuyoa
- Species: C. labiata

Binomial name
- Chinchaysuyoa labiata (Boulenger, 1898)

Synonyms
- Arius labiatus (Boulenger, 1898); Arius henni (Fisher & C. H. Eigenmann, 1922); Hexanematichthys henni (Fisher & Eigenmann, 1922)

Species of fish

Chinchaysuyoa labiata is a species of catfish in the family Ariidae. It was first described under the genus Arius as Arius labiatus in 1898. Another species description Hexanematichthys henni, by Homer Glenn Fisher and Carl H. Eigenmann in 1922 is now considered to be a junior synonym. A study in 2019 found that C. labiata was distinct from any other catfish species in the region, and thus constructed the genus Chinchaysuyoa for it and the recently discovered species C. ortegai. It is endemic to freshwater bodies in Ecuador.
