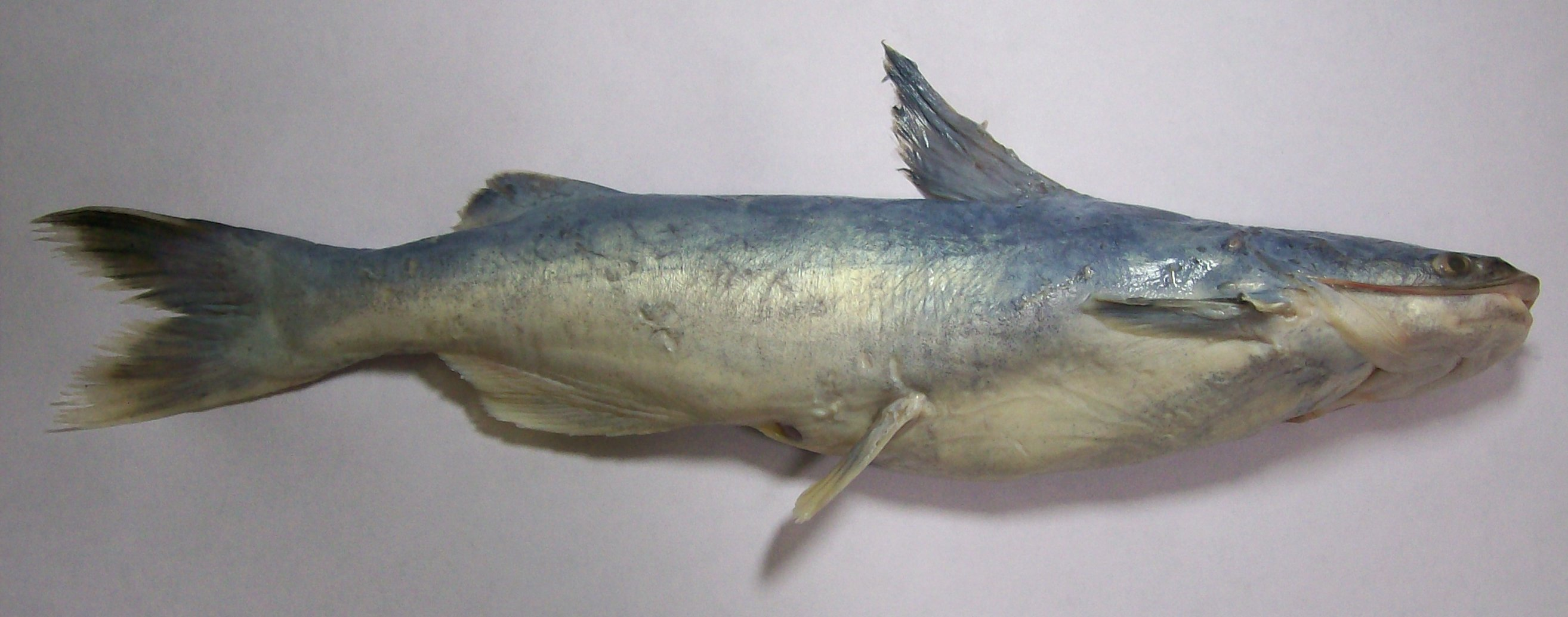

Conservation status
- Least Concern (IUCN 3.1)

Scientific classification
- Kingdom: Animalia
- Phylum: Chordata
- Class: Actinopterygii
- Order: Siluriformes
- Family: Ariidae
- Genus: Osteogeneiosus; Bleeker, 1846
- Species: O. militaris

Binomial name
- Osteogeneiosus militaris (Linnaeus, 1758)

Synonyms
- Silurus militaris Linnaeus, 1758; Osteogeneiosus blochii Bleeker, 1846; Osteogeneiosus gracilis Bleeker, 1846; Osteogeneiosus ingluvies Bleeker, 1846; Osteogeneiosus longiceps Bleeker, 1846; Osteogeneiosus macrocephalus Bleeker, 1846; Osteogeneiosus valenciennesi Bleeker, 1846; Osteogeneiosus cantoris Bleeker, 1853; Osteogeneiosus sthenocephalus Day, 1877

= Osteogeneiosus =

Genus of fishes

Osteogeneiosus militaris, the soldier catfish, is a species of sea catfish found in the Indian and western Pacific Oceans from Pakistan to the Malay Archipelago. It is found in marine, brackish and fresh waters along the coasts. It grows to a length of 35 cm (14 in) and is commercially caught for human consumption. It has a single pair of stiff, sharp, maxillary barbels.
