= Nedystoma =

Scientific classification
- Kingdom: Animalia
- Phylum: Chordata
- Class: Actinopterygii
- Order: Siluriformes
- Family: Ariidae
- Subfamily: Ariinae
- Genus: Nedystoma; J. D. Ogilby, 1898

Type species
- Nedystoma dayi (E. P. Ramsay & J. D. Ogilby, 1886)

Genus of fishes

Nedystoma is a monospecific genus of sea catfishes endemic to the island of New Guinea where they are found in fresh and brackish waters in both the Indonesian portion and in Papua New Guinea. There is currently only one described species in this genus.

== Species ==
- Nedystoma dayi (E. P. Ramsay & J. D. Ogilby, 1886) (Day's catfish)
