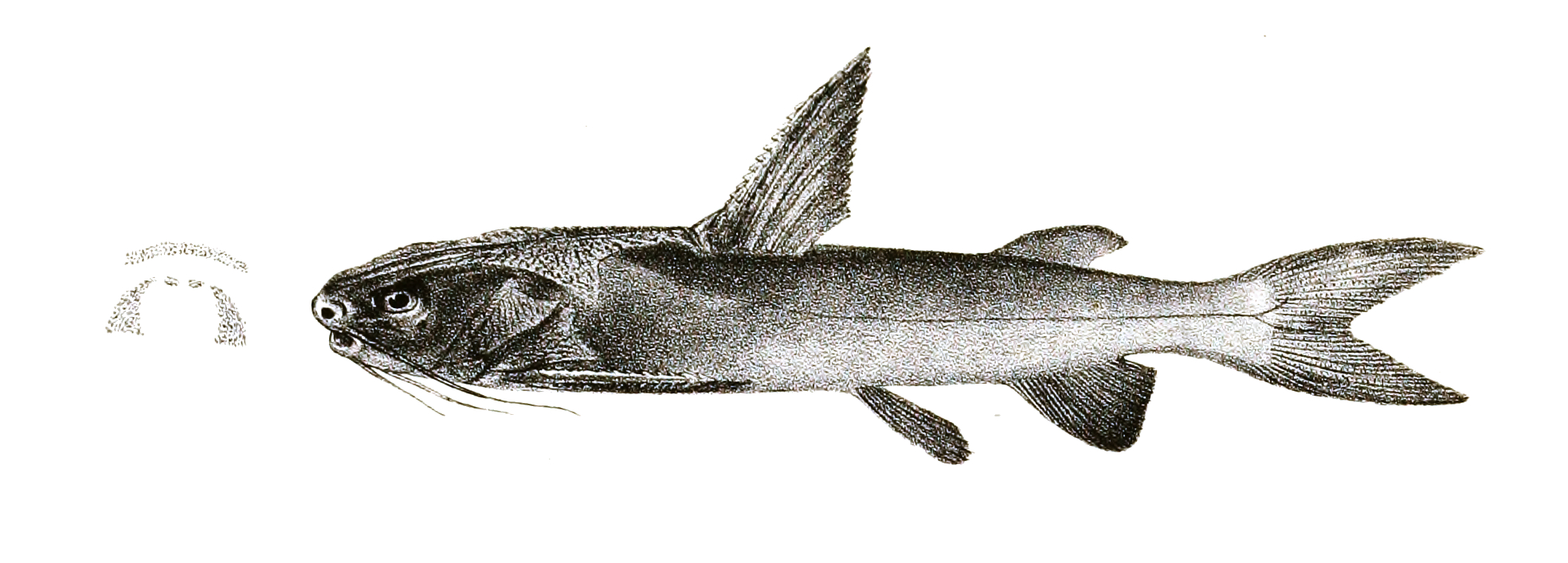

Scientific classification
- Kingdom: Animalia
- Phylum: Chordata
- Class: Actinopterygii
- Order: Siluriformes
- Family: Ariidae
- Genus: Pseudosciades; Marceniuk, Oliveira & Ferraris, 2023
- Species: P. sona

Binomial name
- Pseudosciades sona (Hamilton, 1822)

Synonyms
- Arius sona (Hamilton, 1822); Bagrus trachipomus Valenciennes, 1840; Hemiarius sona (Hamilton, 1822); Hexanematichthys leptocassis Bleeker, 1861; Pimelodus sona Hamilton, 1822; Sciades sona (Hamilton, 1822); Tachysurus sona (Hamilton, 1822)

= Sona sea catfish =

Species of fish

The Sona sea catfish, also called the marine catfish or the dusky catfish, (Pseudosciades sona) is a species of catfish in the family Ariidae. It was described by Francis Buchanan-Hamilton in 1822, originally under the genus Pimelodus. It inhabits rivers, estuaries and marine coasts around Pakistan, Indonesia, Polynesia and Thailand. It reaches a maximum total length of 92 cm (36 in), but more commonly reaches a TL of 55 cm (22 in). Its maximum known life expectancy is 6 years. Males and females mate for life.

The Sona sea catfish feeds on finfish and benthic invertebrates. Its meat is marketed fresh, as well as dried and salted.
