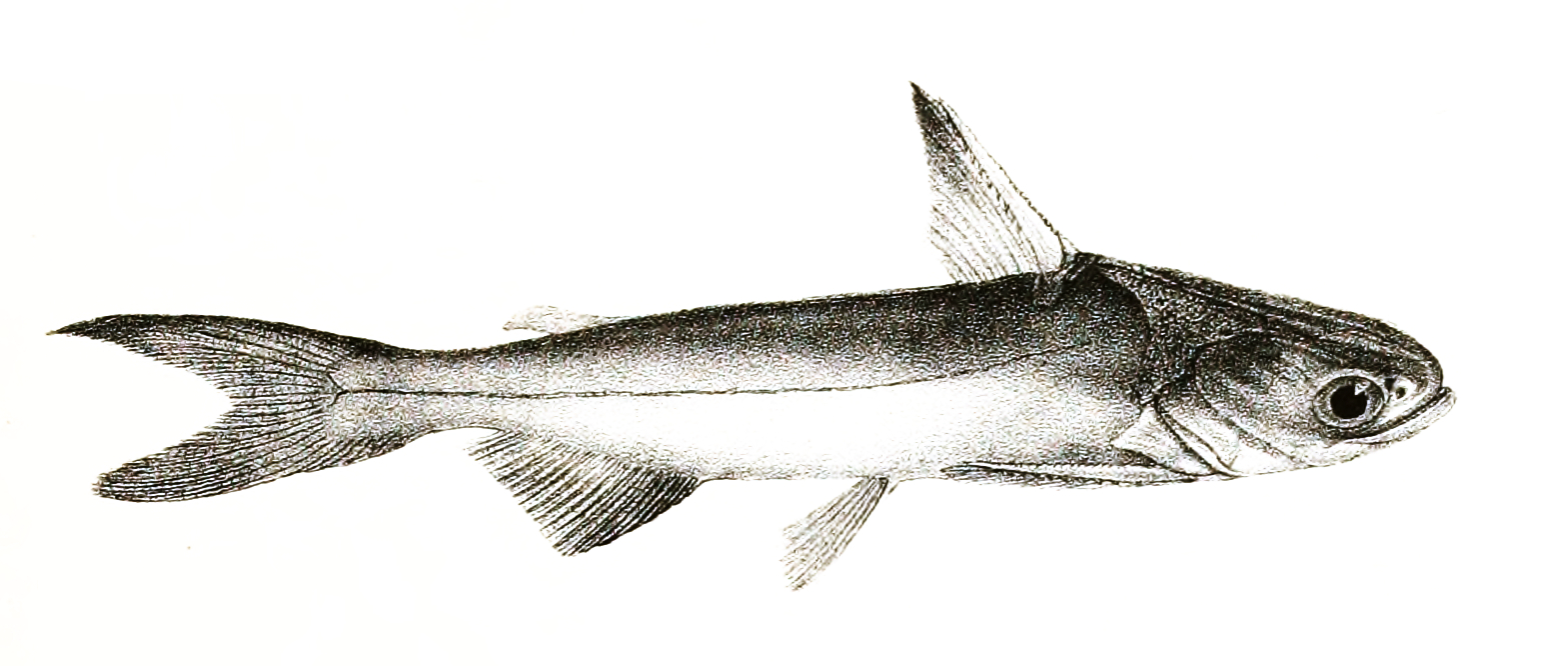

Scientific classification
- Kingdom: Animalia
- Phylum: Chordata
- Class: Actinopterygii
- Order: Siluriformes
- Family: Ariidae
- Genus: Batrachocephalus; Bleeker, 1846
- Species: B. mino

Binomial name
- Batrachocephalus mino (F. Hamilton, 1822)

Synonyms
- Ageneiosus mino F. Hamilton, 1822; Batrachocephalus ageneiosus Bleeker, 1846; Batrachocephalus micropogon Bleeker, 1858

= Batrachocephalus =

Species of catfish

Batrachocephalus mino, the beardless sea catfish, is the only species of catfish (order Siluriformes) in the genus Batrachocephalus of the family Ariidae. This species occurs in marine and brackish waters of Bay of Bengal, and parts of the western central Pacific, in coastal waters, estuaries, and lower reaches of rivers. It is distributed from Pakistan, India, Sri Lanka, Bangladesh, Myanmar, Malaysia, Thailand, to Indonesia.

This fish reaches about 25.0 cm (9.8 in) in total length.

B. mino feeds on invertebrates and small fishes. It is caught commercially for human consumption.
