= Jayaramichthys =

Scientific classification
- Kingdom: Animalia
- Phylum: Chordata
- Class: Actinopterygii
- Order: Siluriformes
- Family: Ariidae
- Genus: Jayaramichthys; Marceniuk, Oliveira & Ferraris, 2023
- Species: J. leptonotacanthus

Binomial name
- Jayaramichthys leptonotacanthus (Bleeker, 1849)

Synonyms
- Arius leptonotacanthus Bleeker, 1849; Cephalocassis leptonotacanthus (Bleeker, 1849)

Species of fish

Jayaramichthys leptonotacanthus is a species of sea catfish in the family Ariidae. It was described by Pieter Bleeker in 1849. It is known from tropical brackish and marine waters in the western Pacific. It reaches a maximum total length of 21 cm (8.3 in). It is the only species in the genus Jayaramichthys.
