= Vorhisia =

Vorhisia Temporal range: Maastrichtian

Scientific classification
- Kingdom: Animalia
- Phylum: Chordata
- Class: Actinopterygii
- Order: Siluriformes
- Family: Ariidae
- Genus: †Vorhisia; Frizzell, 1965
- Species: †V. vulpes

Binomial name
- †Vorhisia vulpes Frizzell, 1965

Vorhisia is an extinct genus of marine catfish known from the Late Cretaceous (Maastrichtian) of North America. It contains a single species, V. vulpes. It is commonly placed in its own family Vorhisiidae, but more recent studies have found it to closely allied to the modern sea catfish family Ariidae, suggesting that it is either better placed in Ariidae, or that Vorhisiidae is the sister group to the ariids.

It is known only from fossil otoliths, which are large, highly distinctive and closely resemble those of ariid catfish, unambiguously supporting its status as a catfish despite the lack of skeletal remains. At some localities, its otoliths represent the most abundant fish remains, suggesting that it was a dominant species in its ecosystem. Fossil otoliths of Vorhisia are extremely common in the Fox Hills Formation of North Dakota (the type locality), the Kemp Clay of Texas, and the Arkadelphia Formation of Arkansas, the Severn Formation of Maryland, where they are the most common fish otoliths. They are also known from Maastrichtian sediments of the Ripley Formation of Mississippi, though not the closely associated, older Coon Creek Formation. This distribution suggests that they inhabited nearshore waters all around the North American coast.

Despite the lack of any skeletal remains, the life history of Vorhisia is comprehensively understood, and possibly the best-known of any fossil catfish, due to isotopic analysis of well-preserved otoliths from the Fox Hills Formation. These isotopes suggest that Vorhisia was a highly migratory fish that spawned in estuarine environments during autumn, and migrated towards the open waters of the Western Interior Seaway within their first year. After three years at sea, adult Vorhisia would migrate back to estuaries to spawn, where they would die after spawning, the likely source of the abundant otoliths in certain localities. Isotopes suggest that they did not inhabit freshwater environments at any stage in their life. The otoliths also suggest that the ambient water temperature of their marine habitat was 18 °C (64 °F), consistent with other estimates of water temperatures around the end-Cretaceous.

Despite their abundance, the specialized lifestyle of Vorhisia & their restriction to North America may have made them uniquely vulnerable to ecosystem shifts, leading to their extinction during the Cretaceous-Paleogene extinction event.
