= Cinetodus =

Scientific classification
- Kingdom: Animalia
- Phylum: Chordata
- Class: Actinopterygii
- Order: Siluriformes
- Family: Ariidae
- Subfamily: Ariinae
- Genus: Cinetodus; J. D. Ogilby, 1898

Type species
- Arius froggatti E. P. Ramsay & J. D. Ogilby, 1886

Synonyms
- Septobranchus Hardenberg, 1941

Genus of fishes

Cinetodus is a genus of sea catfishes (order Siluriformes) of the family Ariidae. This species originates from brackish and fresh waters of Irian Jaya, southern New Guinea and northern Australia.

== Species ==
This genus currently contains a single described species:

- Cinetodus froggatti (E. P. Ramsay & J. D. Ogilby, 1886) – Froggatt's catfish, smallmouthed salmon catfish
