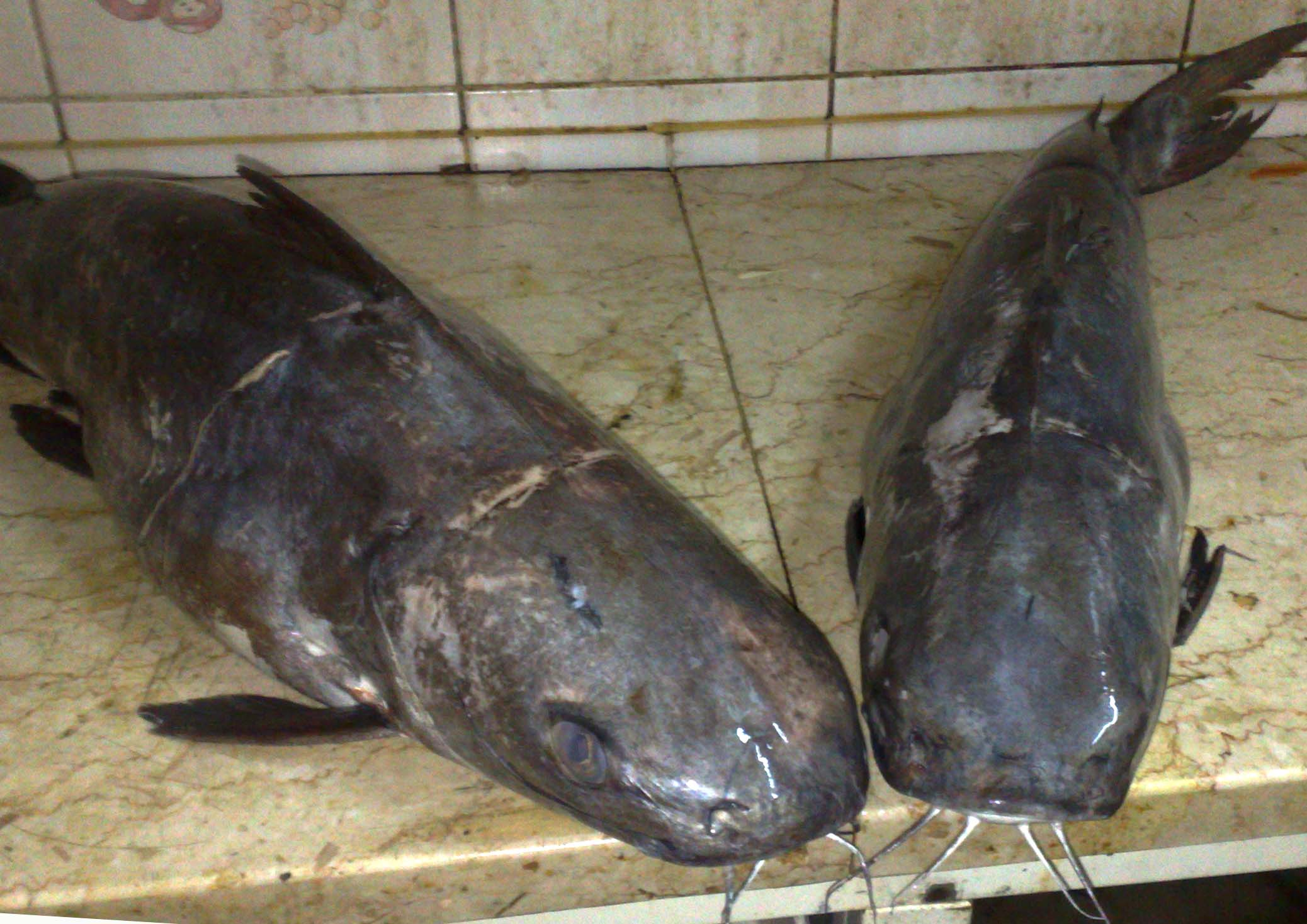
- Plicofollis dussumieri

Scientific classification
- Kingdom: Animalia
- Phylum: Chordata
- Class: Actinopterygii
- Order: Siluriformes
- Family: Ariidae
- Subfamily: Ariinae
- Genus: Plicofollis; Kailola, 2004

Type species
- Arius argyropleuron Valenciennes, 1840

= Plicofollis =

Genus of fishes

Plicofollis is a genus of sea catfishes found along the coasts of the Indian Ocean from Africa to Australasia with some species ranging up into the Philippines. They occur in marine, brackish and fresh waters. There are currently nine described species in this genus.

== Species ==
- Plicofollis argyropleuron (Valenciennes, 1840) (longsnouted catfish)
- Plicofollis dussumieri (Valenciennes, 1840) (blacktip sea-catfish)
- Plicofollis layardi (Günther, 1866) (thinspine sea-catfish)
- Plicofollis magatensis (Herre, 1926)
- Plicofollis nella (Valenciennes, 1840) (smooth-headed catfish)
- Plicofollis platystomus (F. Day, 1877) (flatmouth sea-catfish)
- Plicofollis polystaphylodon (Bleeker, 1846) (Mozambique sea-catfish)
- Plicofollis tenuispinis (F. Day, 1877) (thinspine sea-catfish)
- Plicofollis tonggol (Bleeker, 1846) (roughback sea-catfish)
