= Pararius =

Scientific classification
- Kingdom: Animalia
- Phylum: Chordata
- Class: Actinopterygii
- Order: Siluriformes
- Family: Ariidae
- Subfamily: Ariinae
- Genus: Pararius; Whitley, 1940

Type species
- Arius proximus Ogilby, 1898

Genus of fishes

Pararius is a genus of sea catfishes consisting of two species. The species occur in the coastal waters in the region of South Asia to Australasia. When first described, it was as a subgenus of Tachysurus.

== Species ==
- Pararius mastersi (Ogilby, 1898) (Master's catfish)
- Pararius proximus (Ogilby, 1898) (Arafura catfish)
