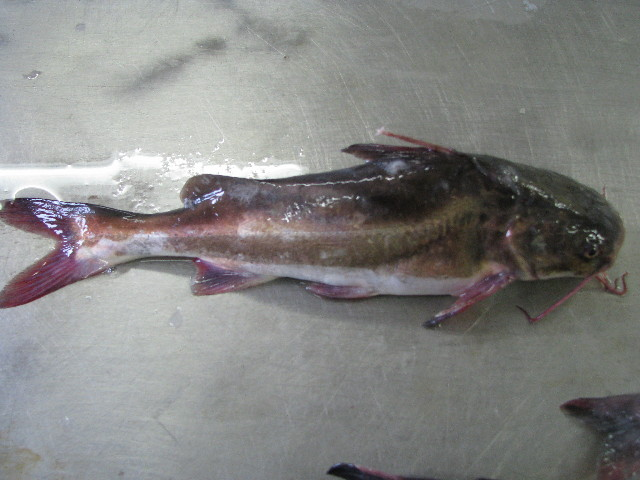

Scientific classification
- Kingdom: Animalia
- Phylum: Chordata
- Class: Actinopterygii
- Order: Siluriformes
- Family: Ariidae
- Genus: Galeichthys
- Species: G. feliceps

Binomial name
- Galeichthys feliceps Valenciennes in Cuvier & Valenciennes, 1840

Synonyms
- Arius feliceps (Valenciennes, 1840); Bagrus feliceps (Valenciennes, 1840); Tachysurus feliceps (Valenciennes, 1840); Pimelodus fossor Lichtenstein, 1823; Bagrus capensis Smith, 1840; Pimelodus peronii Valenciennes, 1840; Galeichthys ocellatus Gilchrist & Thompson, 1916

= Galeichthys feliceps =

Species of fish

Galeichthys feliceps, the white sea catfish, sea barbel, white baggar or white barbel, is a species of sea catfish found in coastal waters and estuaries over muddy bottoms at depths of from 1 – 120 metres where they gather in large shoals. They occur from Namibia to South Africa with questionable records of sightings from Madagascar and Mozambique in Africa and the United States of America and Mexico in North America. It is coloured brown, grey or greenish-brown on the upperparts and is paler below. While most grow to a length of 35 cm, some individuals attain a length of 55 cm with a record of a fish from South Africa weighing 3.8 kg.

The white sea catfish is a mouthbrooder as are the other members of this family. The female lays approximately 50 relatively large (15–16 mm diameter) eggs which the male carries in his mouth for about three to four months. During this time the male does not feed and can lose nearly one quarter of his body weight.

The adults feed on crustaceans, polychaete worms, fishes and mollusks including cephalopods. The juveniles mostly scavenge.

There is a commercial fishery for this species and they are also displayed in public aquariums.

As with many species in this family, the dorsal fin spines are venomous and any wounds inflicted by them must be promptly treated.
