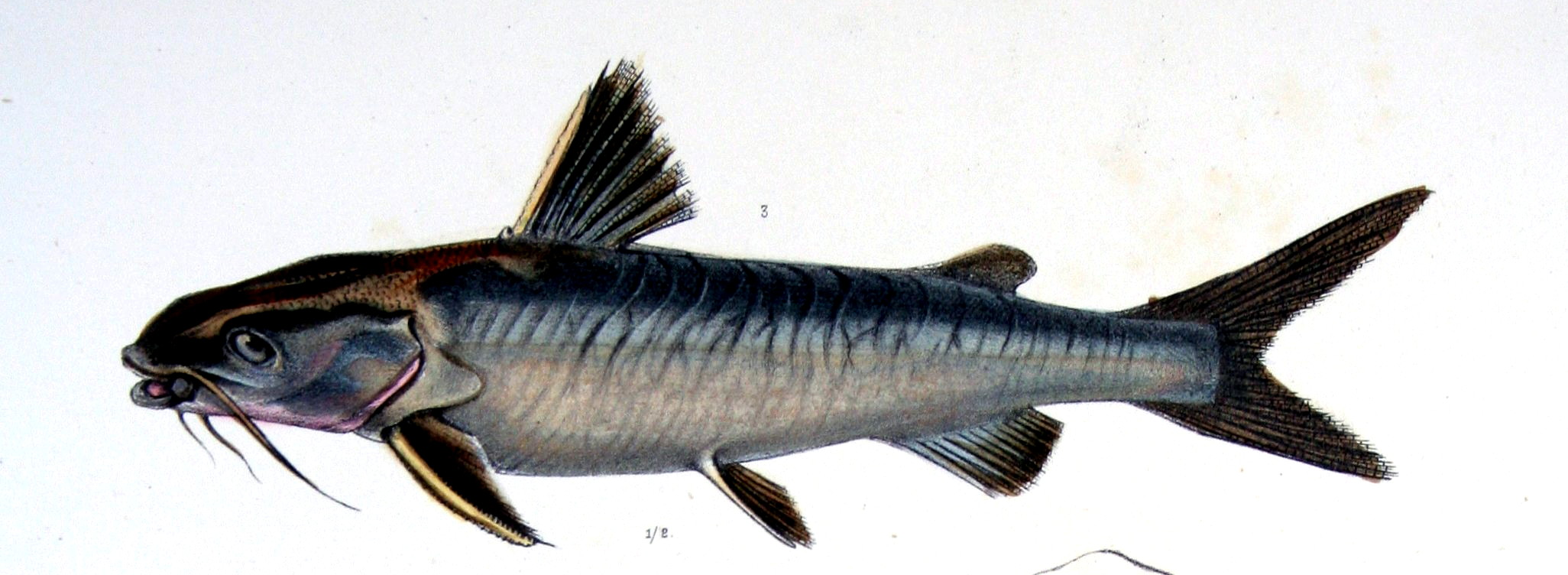

Scientific classification
- Kingdom: Animalia
- Phylum: Chordata
- Class: Actinopterygii
- Division: Teleostei
- Order: Siluriformes
- Family: Ariidae
- Genus: Genidens
- Species: G. barbus

Binomial name
- Genidens barbus (Lacépède, 1803)

Synonyms
- Arius barbus (Lacépède, 1803); Arius commersonii (Lacépède, 1803); Arius upsulonophora (C. H. Eigenmann & R. S. Eigenmann, 1889); Bagrus barbatus Quoy & Gaimard, 1824; Bagrus commersonii (Lacépède, 1803); Galeichthys barbus (Lacépède, 1803); Netuma barba (Lacépède, 1803); Netuma barbus (Lacépède, 1803); Netuma commersoni (Lacépède, 1803); Netuma upsulonophora (C. H. Eigenmann & R. S. Eigenmann, 1889); Netuma upsulonophorus (C. H. Eigenmann & R. S. Eigenmann, 1889); Pimelodus barbus Lacépède, 1803; Pimelodus commersonii Lacépède, 1803; Pimelodus versicolor Castelnau, 1855; Silurus sexdecimradiatus Larrañaga, 1923; Silurus 16-radiatus Larrañaga, 1923; Tachysurus barbus (Lacépède, 1803); Tachisurus barbus (Lacépède, 1803); Tachisurus upsulonophorus C. H. Eigenmann & R. S. Eigenmann, 1889; Tachysurus upsulonophorus C. H. Eigenmann & R. S. Eigenmann, 1889

= Genidens barbus =

Species of fish

Genidens barbus, the white sea catfish or marine catfish, is a species of catfish in the family Ariidae. It was described by Bernard Germain de Lacépède in 1803, originally under the genus Pimelodus. It is an oceanodromous species that is found between the mouth of Negro River in Patagonia and eastern Brazil. It reaches a maximum total length of 120 cm (47 in). It has been recorded spawning between the months of August–December. The maximum known life expectancy is 36 years.

It is preyed by the South American sea lion. The fish is valued as food in Brazil.
