= Comb-spined catfish =

Conservation status
- Data Deficient (IUCN 3.1)

Scientific classification
- Kingdom: Animalia
- Phylum: Chordata
- Class: Actinopterygii
- Order: Siluriformes
- Family: Ariidae
- Genus: Paracinetodus; Marceniuk, Oliveira & Ferraris, 2023
- Species: P. carinatus

Binomial name
- Paracinetodus carinatus (Weber, 1913)

Synonyms
- Arius (Hemiarius) carinatus Weber, 1913; Cinetodus carinatus (Weber, 1913)

Species of fish

The comb-spined catfish (Paracinetodus carinatus) is a species of catfish in the family Ariidae. It was described by Max Carl Wilhelm Weber in 1913, originally under the genus Arius. It is known to inhabit freshwater rivers in New Guinea. It reaches a standard length of 40 cm (16 in). Its diet includes prawns, detritus, and a variety of terrestrial and aquatic insects and insect larvae.
