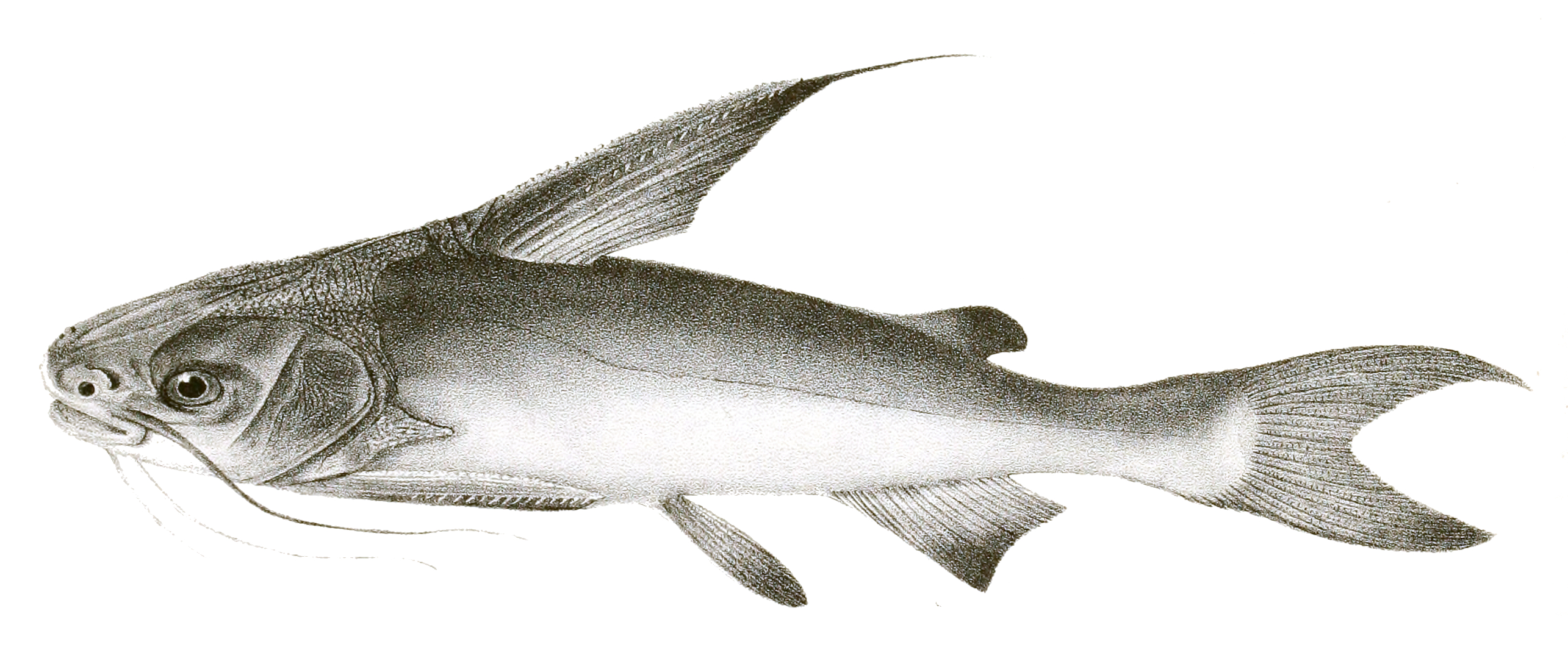

Scientific classification
- Kingdom: Animalia
- Phylum: Chordata
- Class: Actinopterygii
- Order: Siluriformes
- Family: Ariidae
- Genus: Kyataphisa; Marceniuk, Oliveira & Ferraris, 2023
- Species: K. nenga

Binomial name
- Kyataphisa nenga (F. Hamilton, 1822)

Synonyms
- Arius aequibarbis Valenciennes in Cuvier & Valenciennes, 1840; Bagrus arioides Valenciennes in Cuvier & Valenciennes, 1840; Arius caelatoides Bleeker, 1846; Arius caelatus Valenciennes in Cuvier & Valenciennes, 1840; Arius chondropterygius Bleeker, 1846; Arius clypeaster Bleeker, 1846; Arius clypeastroides Bleeker, 1846; Arius granosus Valenciennes in Cuvier & Valenciennes, 1840; Arius melanopterygius Bleeker, 1849; Arius microgastropterygius Bleeker, 1846; Pimelodus nenga Hamilton, 1822; Arius nenga (Hamilton, 1822); Nemapteryx nenga (Hamilton, 1822); Tachysurus nenga (Hamilton, 1822)

= Kyataphisa =

Nemapteryx nenga

Species of fish

Kyataphisa is a monospecific genus of sea catfish in the subfamily Ariinae. Its only species, K. nenga (commonly known as kata) is found in the Arabian Sea, the Bay of Bengal and the Pacific Ocean off Thailand. It is found in marine as well as brackish waters, and reaches a maximum length of 30 cm (12 in).
