= Chinchaysuyoa =

Scientific classification
- Kingdom: Animalia
- Phylum: Chordata
- Class: Actinopterygii
- Order: Siluriformes
- Family: Ariidae
- Genus: Chinchaysuyoa; Marceniuk, Marchena, Oliveira, and Betancur-R, 2019

Genus of fishes

Chinchaysuyoa is a genus of catfishes in the family Ariidae. They are found in freshwater habitats along the Pacific Coast of northern South America. This genus was named after Chinchay Suyu, the Incan name for the region that these fishes are native to.

== Species ==
There are currently two species in this genus:

- Chinchaysuyoa labiata (Boulenger, 1898)
- Chinchaysuyoa ortegai Marceniuk, Marchena, Oliveira & Betancur-R, 2019
