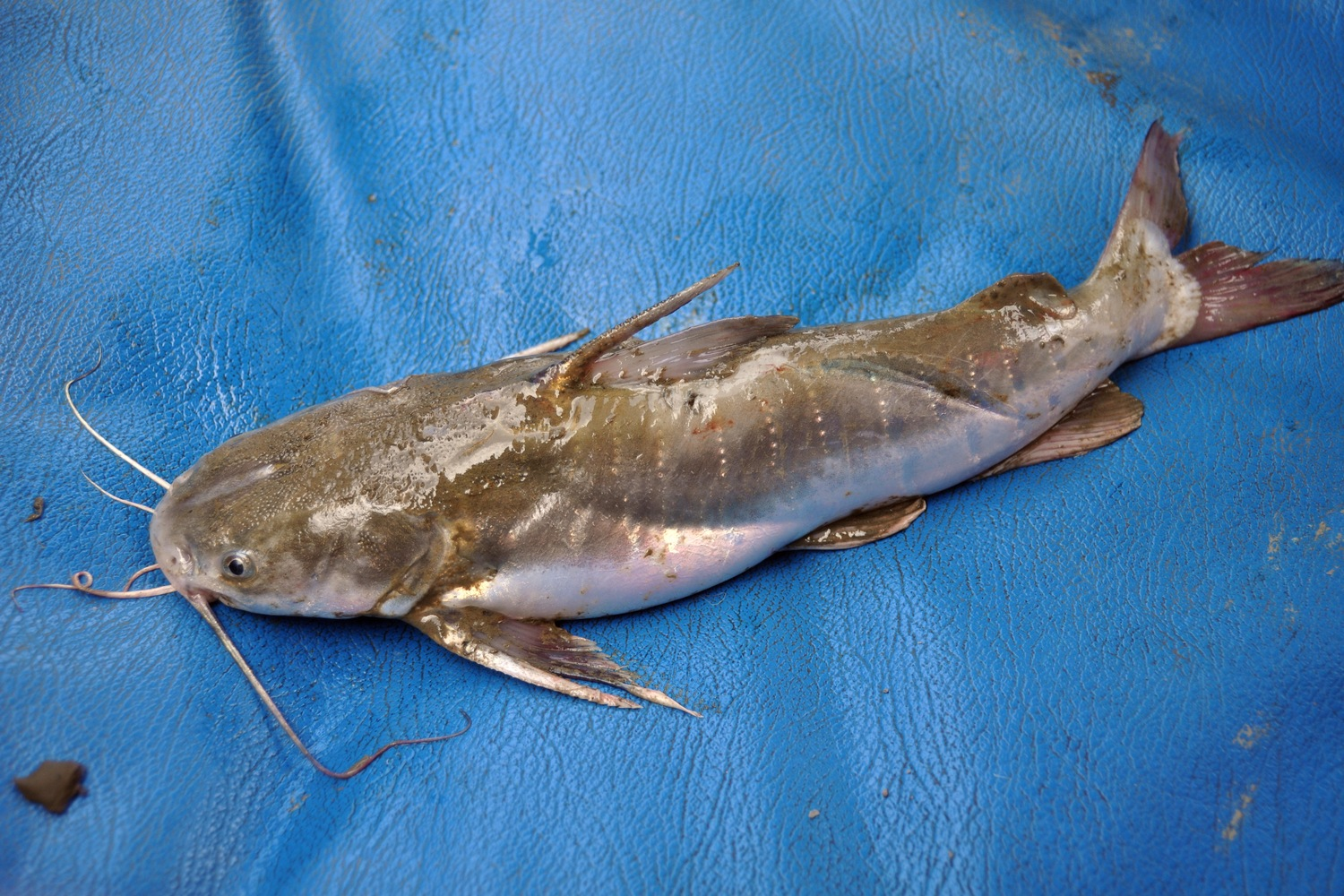

Scientific classification
- Kingdom: Animalia
- Phylum: Chordata
- Class: Actinopterygii
- Order: Siluriformes
- Family: Ariidae
- Genus: Hexanematichthys
- Species: H. sagor

Binomial name
- Hexanematichthys sagor (Hamilton, 1822)

Synonyms
- Arius sagor (Hamilton, 1822); Bagrus doroides Valenciennes, 1840; Bagrus javensis Valenciennes, 1840; Bagrus sondaicus Valenciennes, 1840; Pimelodus sagor Hamilton, 1822; Tachysurus sagor (Hamilton, 1822)

= Hexanematichthys sagor =

Species of fish

Hexanematichthys sagor, the Sagor catfish, Sagor sea catfish, Sunda sea-catfish, marine catfish or dusky catfish, is a species of catfish in the family Ariidae. It was described by Francis Buchanan-Hamilton in 1822, originally under the genus Pimelodus. It inhabits estuaries and freshwater bodies in numerous areas of the Indo-Western Pacific Ocean. It reaches a maximum total length of 45 cm (18 in), more commonly reaching a TL of 30 cm (12 in).

The diet of the Sagor catfish consists of finfish and benthic invertebrates. Its meat is sold fresh.
