= Nemapteryx =

Scientific classification
- Kingdom: Animalia
- Phylum: Chordata
- Class: Actinopterygii
- Order: Siluriformes
- Family: Ariidae
- Subfamily: Ariinae
- Genus: Nemapteryx; J. D. Ogilby, 1908

Type species
- Arius stirlingi Ogilby, 1898

Genus of fishes

Nemapteryx is a genus of sea catfishes found mostly in coastal marine and brackish waters from South Asia to Australia. There is currently only one described species in this genus.

== Species ==
- Nemapteryx armiger (De Vis, 1884) (Threadfin catfish )
