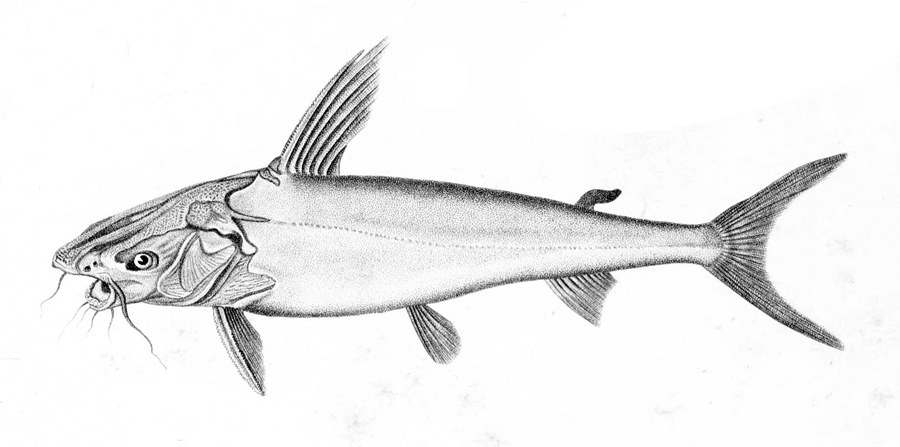
- Netuma thalassina

Scientific classification
- Kingdom: Animalia
- Phylum: Chordata
- Class: Actinopterygii
- Order: Siluriformes
- Family: Ariidae
- Subfamily: Ariinae
- Genus: Netuma; Bleeker, 1858

Type species
- Bagrus netuma Valenciennes, 1840

= Netuma =

Genus of fishes

Netuma is a genus of sea catfishes found in the Indian Ocean and the western Pacific Ocean where it occurs in marine, brackish and fresh waters from the coasts of Africa to Australia to China. There are currently three recognized species in this genus.

The largest species, the giant catfish Netuma thalassina, can grow to 185 cm (73 in) total length.

== Species ==
There are currently 3 recognized species:

- Netuma bilineata (Valenciennes, 1840) (Bronze catfish)
- Netuma patriciae Y. Takahashi, S. Kimura & H. Motomura, 2019 (Whipfin sea catfish)
- Netuma thalassina (Rüppell, 1837) (Giant catfish)
