= Hemipimelodus =

Conservation status
- Least Concern (IUCN 3.1)

Scientific classification
- Kingdom: Animalia
- Phylum: Chordata
- Class: Actinopterygii
- Order: Siluriformes
- Family: Ariidae
- Genus: Hemipimelodus; Bleeker, 1857
- Species: H. borneensis

Binomial name
- Hemipimelodus borneensis (Bleeker, 1851)

Synonyms
- Pimelodus borneensis Bleeker, 1851; Cephalocassis borneensis (Bleeker 1851); Hemipimelodus macrocephalus Bleeker, 1858; Hemipimelodus siamensis Sauvage, 1878; Hemipimelodus intermedius Vinciguerra, 1881

Species of fish

Hemipimelodus is a monospecific genus of catfish in the subfamily Ariinae. Its only species is H. borneensis, which is found in brackish and freshwater bodies in Malaysia, Cambodia, Vietnam, Laos, Thailand, and Indonesia. It reaches a standard length of 30 cm (12 in).

== Taxonomy ==
Hemipimelodus borneensis was described by Pieter Bleeker in 1851, originally under the genus Pimelodus. It has been referred to by several other synonyms, including Hemipimelodus intermedius, Hemipimelodus macrocephalus, and Hemipimelodus siamensis. It is classified in the Ariidae family of the order Siluriformes (the catfishes).

== Distribution ==
H. borneensis occurs in southeast Asia, in Malaysia, Cambodia, Vietnam, Laos, Thailand, and Indonesia. It is found in the Mekong, Bank Pakong, and Chao Phraya river basins in Mainland Southeast Asia; the Musi River basin on the island of Sumatra; and the Baram and Barito river basins on the island of Borneo. Danau Sentarum National Park is within its range. It is believed that the mainland and island populations represent the same species, but detailed research to prove this has not yet been done.

== Ecology ==
This species is assessed as a least concern species on the IUCN Red List because is abundant in its range and its population size appears stable. Deforestation occurs in its range and represents the most major threat to the population. It is fished by subsistence fishermen.

H. borneensis feeds on bivalves, mollusks, crustaceans, macrophytes, and plant detritus. It is tolerant of brackish water and can grow up to 30 cm (12 in) in standard length. After mating, the male carries the fertilized eggs in its mouth until they hatch.
