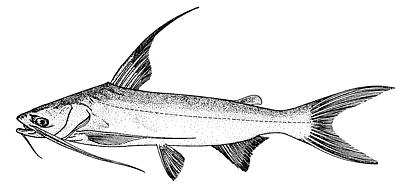
- Bagre marinus

Scientific classification
- Kingdom: Animalia
- Phylum: Chordata
- Class: Actinopterygii
- Order: Siluriformes
- Superfamily: Arioidea
- Family: Ariidae; Bleeker, 1858

Subfamilies
- See text

= Ariidae =

Ariidae Temporal range: Campanian–recent

Family of fishes

The Ariidae or ariid catfish are a family of catfish that mainly live in marine waters with many freshwater and brackish water species. They are found worldwide in tropical to warm temperate zones. The family includes about 143 species.

The Ariidae are among the oldest known siluroid catfish known from fossil remains. Fossilized pectoral spines and skull bone fragments of ariid catfish are known from the Late Cretaceous (Campanian and Maastrichtian) of Argentina. The ariid relative Vorhisia is known from highly abundant fossil otoliths from Maastrichtian-aged nearshore marine formations of North America.

== Taxonomy ==
The relationships of this family are not yet clear. Two of the genera, Gogo and Ancharius, have been moved to a separate family called Anchariidae. The Ariidae are divided into three subfamilies: Galeichthys is the only genus classified in the subfamily Galeichthyinae and similarly Bagre is the only genus in the subfamily Bagreinae, while the rest of the genera are classified in the subfamily Ariinae.

Previously, the family Ariidae has been grouped in the superfamily Doradoidea, but then it was moved into Bagroidea (along with Austroglanididae, Claroteidae, Schilbeidae, Pangasiidae, Bagridae, Malapteruridae, and Pimelodidae. It has also been classified in a superfamily Arioidea containing Ariidae and Anchariidae.

The following genera are placed in this family:

- †Vorhisia Frizzell, 1965 (Maastrichtian of North America, potentially in its own family Vorhisiidae)
- Ariinae Bleeker, 1858

- Aceroichthys Marceniuk, Oliveira & Ferraris, 2023
- Ariopsis Gill, 1861
- Arius Valenciennes in G. Cuvier & Valenciennes, 1840
- Batrachocephalus Bleeker, 1846
- Betancurichthys Marceniuk, Oliveira & Ferraris, 2023
- Bleekeriella Marceniuk, Oliveira & Ferraris, 2023
- Brustiarius Herre, 1935
- Carlarius Marceniuk & Menezes, 2007
- Cathorops Jordan & Gilbert, 1883
- Cephalocassis Bleeker, 1857
- Chinchaysuyoa Marceniuk, Marchena, Oliveira, and Betancur-R, 2019
- Cinetodus Ogilby, 1898
- Cochlefelis Whitley, 1941
- Cryptarius Kailola, 2004
- Doiichthys Weber, 1913
- Genidens Castelnau, 1855
- Hemiarius Bleeker, 1862
- Hemipimelodus Bleeker, 1857
- Hexanematichthys Bleeker, 1858
- Jayaramichthys Marceniuk, Oliveira & Ferraris, 2023
- Ketengus Bleeker, 1846
- Kyataphisa Marceniuk, Oliveira & Ferraris, 2023
- Megalosciades Marceniuk, Oliveira & Ferraris, 2023
- Nedystoma Ogilby, 1898
- Nemapteryx Ogilby, 1908
- Neoarius Castelnau, 1878
  - includes Amissidens
- Netuma Bleeker, 1858
- Notarius Gill, 1863
  - includes Amphiarius and Aspistor
- Occidentarius Betancur-R. & Acero P., 2007
- Osteogeneiosus Bleeker, 1846
- Pachyula Ogilby, 1898
- Papuarius Marceniuk, Oliveira & Ferraris, 2023
- Paracinetodus Marceniuk, Oliveira & Ferraris, 2023
- Paragenidens Marceniuk, Ingenito, Lima, Gasparini & Oliveira, 2019
- Pararius Whitley, 1940
- Plicofollis Kailola, 2004
- Potamarius Hubbs & Miller, 1960
- Potamosilurus Marceniuk & Menezes, 2007
- Pseudosciades Marceniuk, Oliveira & Ferraris, 2023
- †Qarmoutus El-Sayed et al, 2017 (fossil; Late Eocene of Egypt)
- Sciades Müller & Troschel, 1849

- Bagreinae Schultz, 1944
  - Bagre Cloquet, 1816
- Galeichthyinae Acero & Betancur-R., 2007
  - Galeichthys Valenciennes in G. Cuvier & Valenciennes, 1840

== Distribution and habitat ==
Ariids are found worldwide in tropical to warm temperate zones. Ariids are unusual among catfish in that they live primarily in the sea; the majority of catfish families are strictly freshwater and have little tolerance for brackish or marine conditions. Ariid catfish are found in shallow temperate and tropical seas around the coastlines of North and South America, Africa, Asia, and Australia.

Many other species of catfish are also present in freshwater habitats; some species only occur in freshwater. In North and South America, about 43 species extend into brackish water or are found exclusively in fresh water.

== Appearance and anatomy ==
Ariid catfish have a deeply forked caudal fin. Usually, three pairs of barbels are present. They possess some bony plates on their heads and near their dorsal fins. Some species have venomous spines in their dorsal and pectoral fins.

=== Skull ===
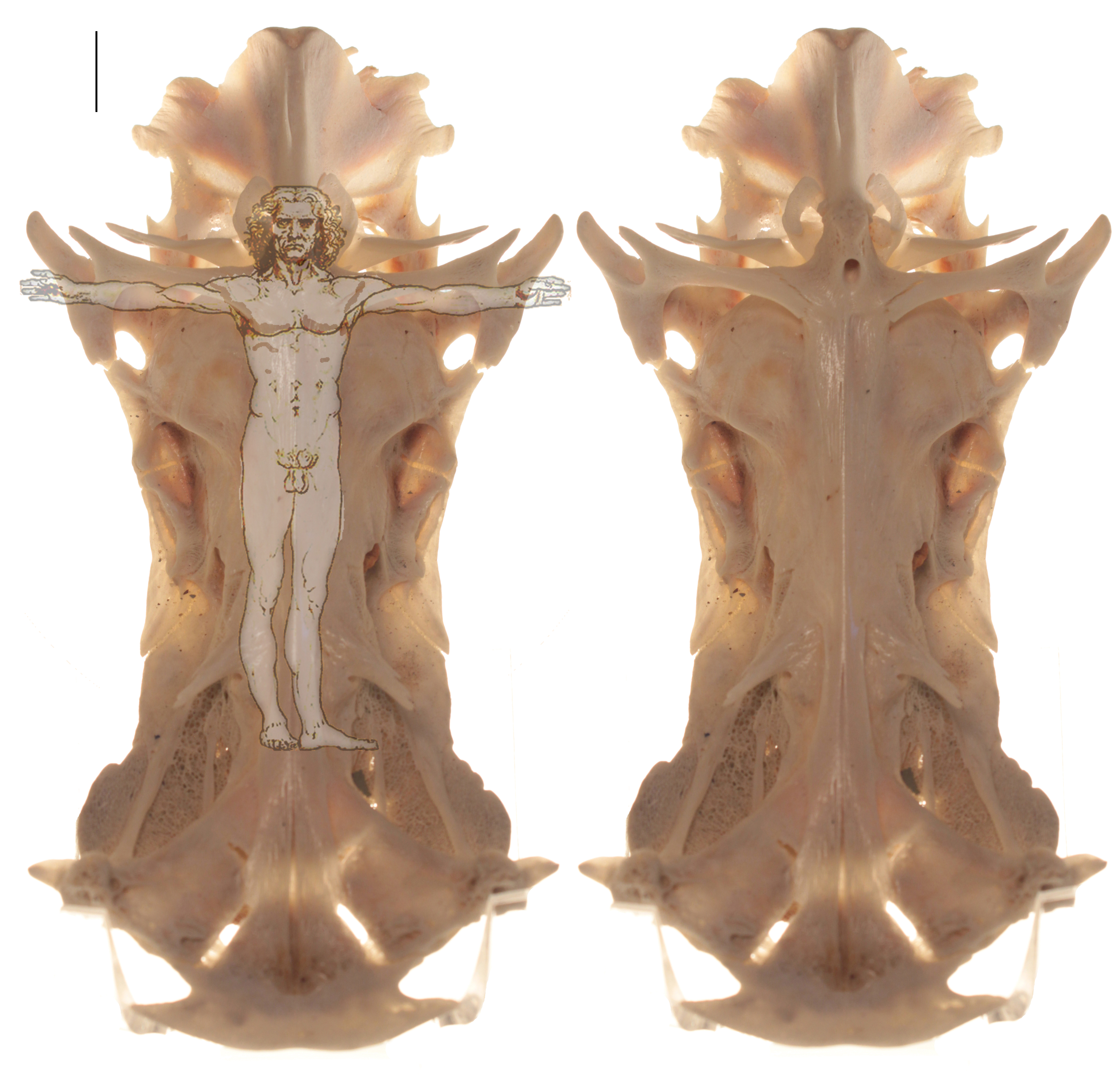
The left image has Vitruvian Man superimposed in an ariid catfish skull, while the right image is simply the skull. In the upper left hand corner, the small black line provides a scale of 1 cm (0.39 in).

The gafftopsail catfish is sometimes called the "crucifix catfish" because its dried skull bones resemble a cruciform man. This is an example of pareidolia.

== Ecology ==
Beyond their maritime habitat, ariid catfish have a number of unique adaptations that set them apart from other catfish. Most, if not all species, are mouthbrooding fish, with the male carrying a small clutch of a few dozen, tiny eggs for about two months until the eggs hatch and the fry become free-swimming.

== Relationship to humans ==
One well-known ariid catfish is the hardhead catfish, Ariopsis felis, abundant along the Western Atlantic coast from Massachusetts to Mexico. Although hardhead catfish reach a weight of about 5.5 kg (12 lb) and are edible, they have a mixed reputation as game fish and are often considered nuisance bait stealers.

A less-abundant species, more highly regarded as a game and food fish, is the gafftopsail catfish, Bagre marinus. The range of the gafftop extends further south, to Venezuela.

The smaller ariid catfishes have minor value as public and home aquarium fish. In 1972, the Shedd Aquarium in Chicago received worldwide acclaim for the first successful breeding of Ariopsis felis in captivity, a feat they have repeated several times since. The Colombian shark catfish Sciades seemanni (until recently Hexanematichthys seemanni) is a fairly popular aquarium fish, though it has been traded under a variety of spurious names, such as Arius jordani and Arius seemani. Less commonly traded aquarium species include Arius berneyi and Arius graeffei.

== See also ==
- List of fish species that protect their young
