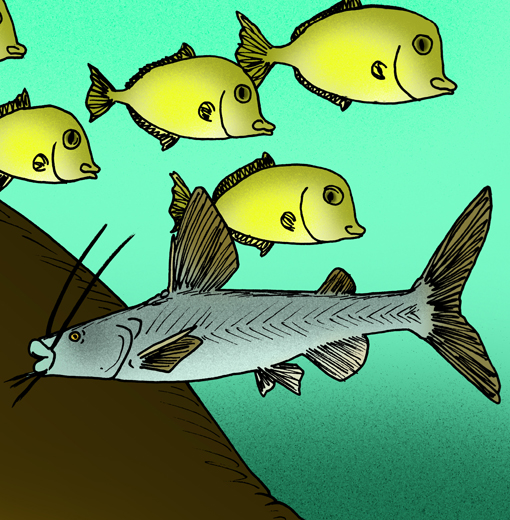
- Restoration as an ariid catfish

Scientific classification
- Kingdom: Animalia
- Phylum: Chordata
- Class: Actinopterygii
- Order: Siluriformes
- Family: Ariidae
- Genus: †Qarmoutus; El-Sayed et al, 2017

Type species
- †Qarmoutus hitanensis El-Sayed et al, 2017

= Qarmoutus =

Qarmoutus Temporal range: Eocene

Extinct genus of fishes

Qarmoutus hitanensis is an extinct ariid catfish whose fossils were first discovered in Birket Qarun Formation, Wadi Al-Hitan, Egypt. It lived during the Eocene period around 37 million years ago, and its body length is estimated to be about 6.5 ft (2.0 m) long.

The following cladogram is based on a parsimonious phylogenetic tree with equally weighted characters from the original description of Qarmoutus, with updated binomial names:

- - - Sciades parkeri
    - Sciades proops
  - - Sciades herzbergii
    - - Sciades couma
      - Sciades passany
- - - Qarmoutus hitanensis
    - - Potamarius izabalensis
      - Potamarius grandoculis
  - - Ariopsis assimilis
    - - Ariopsis bonillai
      - Ariopsis felis
    - - Ariopsis guatemalensis
      - Ariopsis seemanni
