= List of fish used for fish maw =

Fish maw is sourced from various types of fish. It is largely consumed in China, where Sciaenidae (croakers/drums) tend to command the highest price per pound. While virtually any teleost fish has an edible swim bladder, certain fish species have been specifically targeted for their perceived high-quality fish maw.

| Species | Family | Common name | Region | Refs |
|---|---|---|---|---|
| Anguilla marmorata | Anguillidae | giant mottled eel | Indo-Pacific | |
| Arius thalassinus | Ariidae | giant catfish | Indo-Pacific | |
| Aspistor quadriscutis | Ariidae | Bressou sea catfish, cangatá | Atlantic, west | |
| Bagre bagre | Ariidae | coco sea catfish, bandeirado | Atlantic, west | |
| Bahaba taipingensis | Sciaenidae | giant yellow croaker, Chinese bahaba | China Seas | |
| Boesemania microlepis | Sciaenidae | Boesman croaker; maw: Spider maw | Southeast Asia | |
| Conger cinereus | Congridae | longfin African conger | Indo-Pacific | |
| Congresox talabonoides | Muraenesocidae | Indian pike conger | Indo-Pacific | |
| Cynoscion acoupa | Sciaenidae | acoupa weakfish, pescada amarela | Atlantic, west | |
| Cynoscion microlepidotus | Sciaenidae | smallscale weakfish, corvina | Atlantic, west | |
| Cynoscion othonopterus | Sciaenidae | Gulf corvina | Gulf of California | |
| Cynoscion virescens | Sciaenidae | green weakfish, corvina | Atlantic, west | |
| Daysciaena albida | Sciaenidae | Bengal corvina | Indian Ocean | |
| Diodon liturosus | Diodontidae | Black-blotched porcupinefish | Indo-Pacific | |
| Eleutheronema tetradactylum | Polynemidae | Indian salmon, fourfinger redfin | Indo-Pacific | |
| Hypophthalmichthys nobilis | Xenocyprididae | bighead carp | Pacific, east | |
| Johnius coitor | Sciaenidae | datina koral | Indo-Pacific | |
| Johnius macropterus | Sciaenidae | gulamah | Indo-Pacific | |
| Larimichthys crocea | Sciaenidae | large yellow croaker | Pacific, west | |
| Lates calcarifer | Latidae | barramundi | Indo-Pacific | |
| Lates niloticus | Latidae | Nile perch | Afrotropical realm | |
| Leptomelanosoma indicum | Polynemidae | Indian threadfin | Indo-Pacific | |
| Macrodon ancylodon | Sciaenidae | king weakfish, pescada gó | Atlantic, west | |
| Muraenesox bagio | Muraenesocidae | pike eel | Indo-Pacific | |
| Muraenesox cinereus | Muraenesocidae | conger pike (海鰻) | Indo-Pacific | |
| Notarius grandicassis | Ariidae | Thomas sea catfish, cambéua | Atlantic, west | |
| Otolithes spp. | Sciaenidae | croakers | Indo-Pacific | |
| Otolithoides biauritus | Sciaenidae | bronze croaker | Indo-Pacific | |
| Nibea soldado | Sciaenidae | soldier croaker | Indo-Pacific | |
| Nibea squamosa | Sciaenidae | scaly croaker | Pacific, west | |
| Pangasius hypophthalmus | Pangasiidae | pangasius, iridescent shark catfish | South Asia, Southeast Asia | |
| Plagioscion ternetzi | Sciaenidae | freshwater croaker | Río de la Plata | |
| Pomadasys argenteus | Haemulidae | silver grunt | Indo-Pacific | |
| Priacanthus tayenus | Priacanthidae | bigeye snapper | Indo-Pacific | |
| Protonibea diacanthus | Sciaenidae | black spotted croaker, brown croaker | Indo-Pacific | |
| Pseudotolithus senegalensis | Sciaenidae | cassava croaker | Atlantic, east | |
| Sciades couma | Ariidae | couma sea catfish | Atlantic, west | |
| Sciades parkeri | Ariidae | gillbacker sea catfish; gurijuba | Atlantic, west | |
| Sciades proops | Ariidae | crucifix sea catfish | Atlantic, west | |
| Totoaba macdonaldi | Sciaenidae | totoaba (加利福尼亚石首鱼, transl. California croaker); maw: San Francisco maw, large whiskered jinqian (lit. 'money fish') | Gulf of California | |
