= Bagre =

Bagre or Bagré may refer to:

== Animals ==
- Bagre (fish), a genus of catfish
  - Bagre filamentosus
  - Bagre panamensis
  - Bagre bagre
  - Bagre marinus
  - Bagre pinnimaculatus

== Places and structures ==
=== Brazil ===
- Bagre, Pará, a municipality

=== Burkina Faso ===
- Bagré Department, commune of Boulgou Province
- Bagré Village, capital of the Bagré Department
- Bagre Dam, near the town of Bagré

=== Colombia ===
- El Bagre, town and municipality in the department of Antioquia
