= Aspistor =

Scientific classification
- Kingdom: Animalia
- Phylum: Chordata
- Class: Actinopterygii
- Order: Siluriformes
- Family: Ariidae
- Subfamily: Ariinae
- Genus: Aspistor; D. S. Jordan & Evermann, 1898

Type species
- Arius luniscutis Valenciennes, 1840

Deprecated genus of fishes

Aspistor was a genus of sea catfishes found along the northeastern coast of South America, where they occur in marine, brackish, and fresh waters. The name is now a synonym of Notarius.

== Species ==
The species formerly in this genus are:

- Aspistor cookei (Acero P. & Betancur-R., 2002); valid as Notarius cookei
- Aspistor hardenbergi (Kailola, 2000); valid as Hemiarius hardenbergi
- Aspistor kessleri (Steindachner, 1876); valid as Notarius kessleri
- Aspistor luniscutis (Valenciennes, 1840); valid as Notarius luniscutis
- Aspistor neogranatensis (Acero P. & Betancur-R., 2002); valid as Notarius neogranatensis
- Aspistor osculus (Jordan & Gilbert, 1883); valid as Notarius osculus
- Aspistor parkeri (Traill, 1832); valid as Sciades parkeri
- Aspistor planiceps (Steindachner, 1876); valid as Notarius planiceps
- Aspistor platypogon (Günther, 1864); valid as Occidentarius platypogon
- Aspistor quadriscutis (Valenciennes, 1840); valid as Notarius quadriscutis

As of August 2025, FishBase only lists A. hardenbergi.
