= Chasicoan =

The Chasicoan (Spanish: Chasiquense or Spanish: Chasicoense) age is a period of geologic time from 10–9 Ma within the Late Miocene epoch of the Neogene, used more specifically within the SALMA classification in South America. It follows the Mayoan and precedes the Huayquerian age.

Isotopic analysis of the fauna at Arroyo Chasicó, the type locality of the Chasicoan Stage/Age, indicates a paleoenvironment characterized by woodland and wooded C3 grassland, with some taxa showing mixed C3–C4 diets.

== Etymology ==
The Chasicoan is named after the Arroyo Chasicó Formation of the Colorado Basin in northeastern Argentina.

== Formations ==
Locations of Chasicoan formations

Formation bold is type	Country	Basin	Notes
Arroyo Chasicó Formation	Argentina	Colorado Basin	
Bahía Inglesa Formation	Chile	Caldera Basin	
Caujarao Formation	Venezuela	Falcón Basin	
Cerro Azul Formation	Argentina	Colorado Basin	
Coquimbo Formation	Chile	Tongoy Bay	
Loma de Las Tapias Formation	Argentina	Tulum Valley	
Madre de Dios Formation	Peru	Madre de Dios Basin	
Mauri Formation	Bolivia	Altiplano Basin	
Navidad Formation	Chile	Chilean Coast Range	
Puerto Madryn Formation	Argentina	Valdés Basin	
Paraná Formation	Argentina	Paraná Basin	
Pebas Formation	Brazil; Colombia; Ecuador; Peru	Amazon Basin	
Pisco Formation	Peru	Pisco Basin	
Urumaco Formation	Venezuela	Falcón Basin	

== Fossil content ==
Group	Fossils	Formation	Notes
Mammals	Cardiatherium chasicoense, Cardiomys leufuensis, Chasicobradys intermedius, Chasicostylus castroi, Chasicotatus ameghinoi, Epipeltephilus kanti, Lagostomus telenkechanum, Lycopsis viverensis, Paedotherium minor, Pisanodon nazari, Protomegalonyx chasicoensis, Pseudolycopsis cabrerai, Vetelia perforata, Kraglievichia sp., Orthomyctera sp., ?Parodimys sp., Proeuphractus sp., ?Tetrastylus sp., Typotheriopsis sp., Hegetotheriinae indet., Hoplophorini indet., Palaehoplophorini indet., Plohophorini indet., Proterotheriinae indet.	Arroyo; Chasicó	
Mammals	Chasichimys bonaerense, Chasicotatus ameghinoi, Macrochorobates scalabrinii	Cerro; Azul	
Mammals	Cardiatherium chasicoense, Contrerascynus borhyaenoides	Loma de las Tapias	
Mammals	Notiomastodon sp.	Madre de Dios	
Mammals	Bolivartherium urumaquensis, Bounodus enigmaticus, Ischyrorhynchus cf. vanbenedeni, Pseudoprepotherium urumaquensis, Urumaquia robusta, Gyrinodon sp., Neoepiblema sp., Potamarchus sp., Ribodon sp., Saurocetes sp.	Urumaco	
Birds	Psilopterus colzecus	Arroyo; Chasicó	
Birds	Leptoptilos patagonicus	Puerto Madryn	
Reptiles & amphibians	Carlesia cf. pendolai, Anura indet., Testudines indet.	Arroyo; Chasicó	
Reptiles & amphibians	Bairdemys venezuelensis, Caiman brevirostris, C. wannlangstoni, Charactosuchus mendesi, Globidentosuchus brachyrostris, Gryposuchus croizati, G. jessei, G. cf. pachakamue, Hesperogavialis cruxenti, Ikanogavialis gameroi, Melanosuchus fisheri, Mourasuchus arendsi, Purussaurus mirandai, Boinae indet.	Urumaco	
Fishes	Megalodon, Hemipristis serra, Carcharhinus sp., Galeocerdo sp., Rhinoptera sp., Sphyrna sp.	Caujarao	
Fishes	Ariidae indet., Carcharhinidae indet., Dasyatidae indet., Hemigaleidae indet., Heterodontidae indet., Lamnidae indet., Myliobatidae indet., Odontaspididae indet., Otodontidae indet., Physeteroidea indet., Rajidae indet., Sciaenidae indet., Sparidae indet., Sphyrnidae indet., Squatinidae indet.	Paraná	
Fishes	Megalodon, Arius couma, A. dowii, A. herzbergii, A. kessleri, A. quadriscutis, A. rugispinis, Bagre marinus, Carcharhinus caquetius, Epinephelus itajara, Galeocerdo cuvier, Hemipristis serra, Larimus henrii, L. steurbautti, Micropogonias coatesi, Phractocephalus nassi, Pristis pectinata, Carcharhinus sp., Cynoscion sp., Dasyatis sp., Equetus sp., Haemulon sp., Nebris sp., Rhinoptera sp., Sphyrna sp.	Urumaco	
