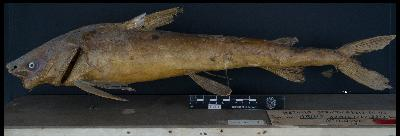
- Notarius grandicassis

Scientific classification
- Kingdom: Animalia
- Phylum: Chordata
- Class: Actinopterygii
- Order: Siluriformes
- Family: Ariidae
- Subfamily: Ariinae
- Genus: Notarius; T. N. Gill, 1863

Type species
- Arius grandicassis Valenciennes, 1840

Synonyms
- Amphiarius Marceniuk & Menezes, 2007; Aspistor Jordan & Evermann, 1898; Sciadeops (subgenus of Sciades) Fowler, 1944

= Notarius (fish) =

Genus of fishes

Notarius is a genus of fish in the family Ariidae found in the Atlantic and Pacific Ocean.

== Species ==
There are currently 17 recognized species in this genus:

- Notarius armbrusteri Betancur-R. & Acero P, 2006
- Notarius biffi Betancur-R. & Acero P, 2004
- Notarius bonillai (Miles, 1945) (New Granada sea catfish)
- Notarius cookei (Acero P & Betancur-R., 2002)
- Notarius grandicassis (Valenciennes, 1840) (Thomas sea catfish)
- Notarius insculptus (D. S. Jordan & C. H. Gilbert, 1883)
- Notarius kessleri (Steindachner, 1876) (Sculptured sea catfish)
- Notarius lentiginosus (C. H. Eigenmann & R. S. Eigenmann, 1888) (Freckled sea catfish)
- Notarius luniscutis (Valenciennes, 1840)
- Notarius neogranatensis (Acero P & Betancur-R., 2002) (Caribbean sculptured sea catfish)
- Notarius osculus (D. S. Jordan & C. H. Gilbert, 1883) (Chomba sea catfish)
- Notarius parmocassis (Valenciennes, 1840)
- Notarius phrygiatus (Valenciennes, 1840) (Kukwari sea catfish)
- Notarius planiceps (Steindachner, 1876) (Flat-head sea catfish)
- Notarius quadriscutis (Valenciennes, 1840) (Bressou sea catfish)
- Notarius rugispinis (Valenciennes, 1840) (Softhead sea catfish)
- Notarius troschelii (T. N. Gill, 1863) (Chili sea catfish)
