= Colorado Basin =

Colorado Basin may refer to:

- the basin of the Colorado River in the United States
- the basin of the Colorado River in Argentina
- Colorado Basin, the sedimentary basin underlying and named after the Colorado River in Argentina
