= Chili sea catfish =

Scientific classification
- Kingdom: Animalia
- Phylum: Chordata
- Class: Actinopterygii
- Order: Siluriformes
- Family: Ariidae
- Genus: Notarius
- Species: N. troschelii

Binomial name
- Notarius troschelii (Gill, 1863)

Synonyms
- Arius brandtii Steindachner, 1876; Arius troscheli (Gill, 1863); Arius troschelii (Gill, 1863); Arius temminckianus (Valenciennes, 1840); Bagrus temminckii Valenciennes, 1840; Bagrus temminckianus Valenciennes, 1840; Galeichthys brandti (Steindachner, 1876); Galeichthys troscheli (Gill, 1863); Sciades troschelii Gill, 1863; Sciadeichthys troschelii (Gill, 1863); Sciadeops troschelii (Gill, 1863); Sciadeops troschellii (Gill, 1863); Tachisurus brandti (Steindachner, 1876)

Species of fish

The Chili sea catfish (Notarius troschelii) is a species of catfish in the family Ariidae. It was described by Theodore Gill in 1863, originally under the genus Sciades. It inhabits marine and brackish waters in Mexico, Costa Rica, Honduras, Ecuador, El Salvador, Colombia, Peru, Nicaragua, Guatemala, and Panama. It dwells at a depth range of 10 to 30 m (33 to 98 ft). It reaches a maximum total length of 70.6 cm (27.8 in), more commonly reaching a TL of 30 cm (12 in).

The chili sea catfish feeds on fish scales. It is currently ranked as Least Concern by the IUCN redlist, although its importance to commercial fisheries is cited as a possible threat to its population. Its meat is marketed fresh.
