= Bagre filamentosus =

Scientific classification
- Kingdom: Animalia
- Phylum: Chordata
- Class: Actinopterygii
- Order: Siluriformes
- Family: Ariidae
- Genus: Bagre
- Species: B. filamentosus

Binomial name
- Bagre filamentosus (Swainson, 1839)

Synonyms
- Felichthys filamentosus Swainson, 1839; Galeichthys blochii Valenciennes, 1840; Galeichthys bahiensis Castelnau, 1855

Species of fish

Bagre filamentosus, the filament sea catfish, is a species of sea catfish in the family Ariidae. It was described by William Swainson in 1839, originally under the genus Felichthys. It inhabits tropical marine and brackish waters ranging between the Caribbean and Brazil, in South America. It dwells at a maximum depth of 50 m (160 ft). It reaches a maximum total length of 57 centimetres (22 in).

This species is often synonymised with Bagre bagre or Bagre marinus.
