= Eopeyeria =

Eopeyeria Temporal range: Late Eocene

Scientific classification
- Kingdom: Animalia
- Phylum: Chordata
- Class: Actinopterygii
- Order: Siluriformes
- Family: Ariidae
- Genus: †Eopeyeria; Whitley, 1947
- Species: †E. aegyptiaca

Binomial name
- †Eopeyeria aegyptiaca (Peyer, 1928)

Synonyms
- Ariopsis aegyptiacus Peyer, 1928

Extinct genus of fishes

Eopeyeria is an extinct genus of marine catfish known from the Late Eocene. It contains a single species, E. aegyptiaca from the Qasr el-Sagha Formation of Egypt. It was initially placed in Ariopsis before being placed into its own genus, but is still thought to be a member of Ariidae.

== See also ==
- Prehistoric fish
- List of prehistoric bony fish
