= Evermannichthys bicolor =

Conservation status
- Data Deficient (IUCN 3.1)

Scientific classification
- Kingdom: Animalia
- Phylum: Chordata
- Class: Actinopterygii
- Division: Teleostei
- Order: Gobiiformes
- Family: Gobiidae
- Genus: Evermannichthys
- Species: E. bicolor

Binomial name
- Evermannichthys bicolor Thacker, 2001

Species of fish

Evermannichthys bicolor (bicolored sponge goby) is a perciform species of fish in the family Gobiidae. As their name suggests, fishes in this species live inside sponges and can be found in the Caribbean Sea. The size of their populations are unknown, meaning it is not currently clear whether the bicolored sponge goby is in need of conservation.

== Description ==
Overall, the body of the bicolored sponge goby is elongate and thin. The scale-covering and the number pores on the head is reduced, and generally measures 2 mm dorso-ventrally. Their color is dark across the dorsal-most third of their bodies, the lower two-thirds are pale, and the fins are generally clear. The frenum, which connects the upper lip to the snout is reduced in size, though the upper lip and snout are separated. The tongue has a notched edge.

== Distribution and habitat ==
This species is demersal living between 27 and 30 m below the surface of tropical oceans. It can be found in the western Atlantic Ocean, especially near the island of Navassa, Jamaica, and Curaçao Very little is known about the population numbers and conservation of this species, and it is considered data deficient by the IUCN.

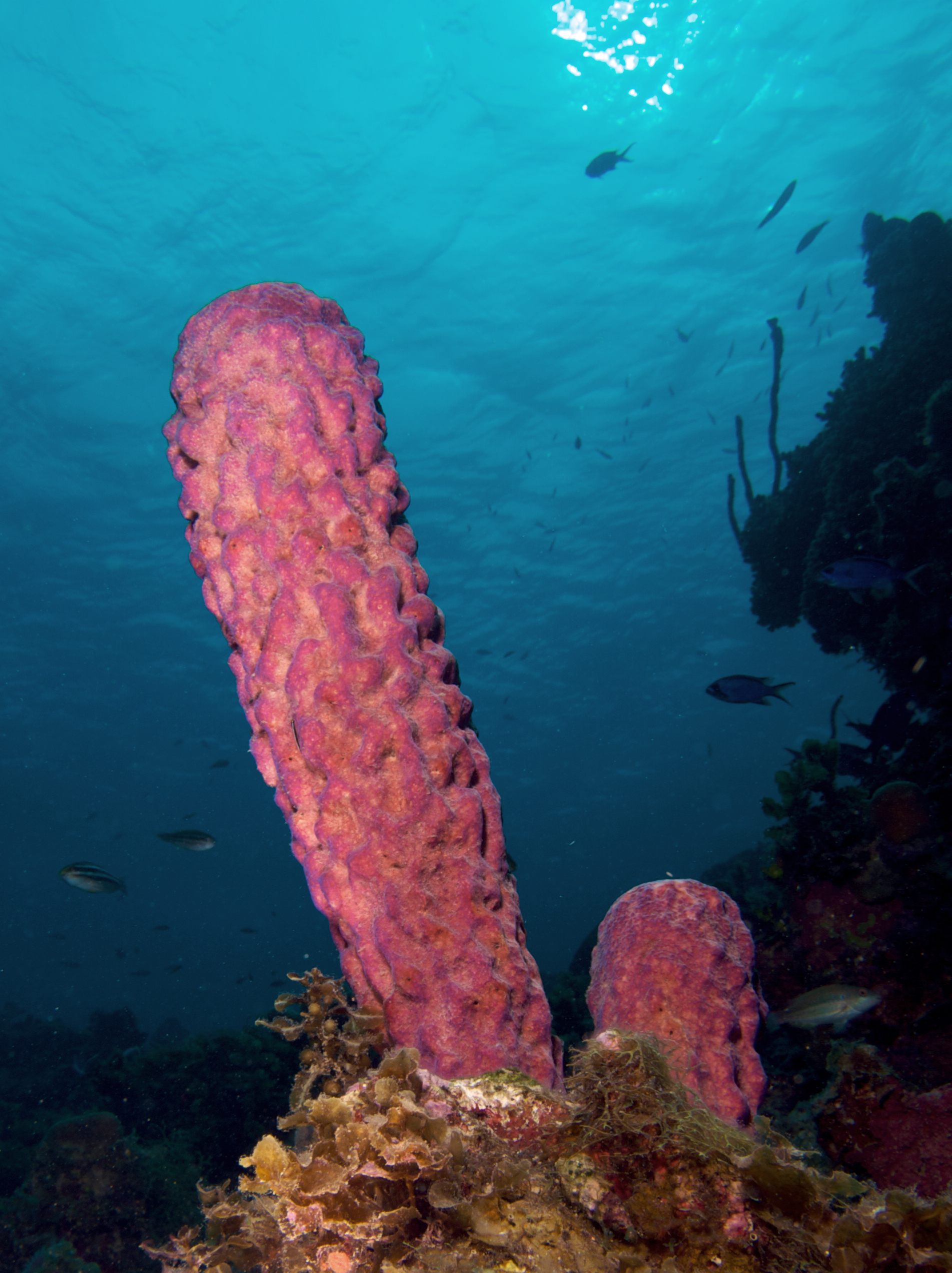
Sponges in the Caribbean, such as this stove-pipe sponge from a reef near Haiti, can be inhabited by the Bicolored sponge goby.

The bicolored sponge goby, as its name implies, lives inside sponges. Specifically, it lives deep within the sponge, near the openings of the in-current canals. The sponges provide protection for the bicolored sponge goby, as well as food, which is transported into the sponge via the in-current canals. It is thought that this species spends its entire life in sponges, and that its eggs either drift into a sponge from open water or are laid directly within a sponge.

== Conservation ==
Bicolored sponge gobies are considered data deficient by the IUCN, meaning that estimations of the total number of individuals and the trend of the population through time is unknown. The species is not used by humans in any way, and no threats to them have been identified. While no specific actions have been taken to conserve this species, many portions of their native range (including their type locality) are protected areas.
