= Colorado Formation, Argentina =

Geologic formation in Argentina

Colorado Formation
- Stratigraphic range: Campanian-Maastrichtian
- Type: Geological formation
- Overlies: Paleozoic basement
- Thickness: 30 m (98 ft)

Lithology
- Primary: Sandstone
- Other: Conglomerate

Location
- Coordinates: 38.2°S 64.5°W
- Approximate paleocoordinates: 41.3°S 49.8°W
- Region: La Pampa Province
- Country: Argentina
- Extent: Colorado Basin

Type section
- Named for: Colorado River
- Colorado Formation, Argentina (Argentina)

The Colorado Formation is a Late Cretaceous (Campanian to Maastrichtian geologic formation that is exposed within the Colorado Basin in the southeastern part of La Pampa Province, Argentina. Fossil dinosaur eggs of Sphaerovum erbeni have been reported from the nonmarine, fluvial strata of this formation.

== Description ==
The formation overlies the Paleozoic basement and has an estimated thickness of 30 metres (98 ft). The Colorado Formation comprises medium-grained sandstones with intercalated conglomerates with pebbly beds that can be interpreted as fluvial to alluvial deposits.

== See also ==
- List of dinosaur-bearing rock formations
- List of stratigraphic units with dinosaur trace fossils#Eggs or nests
