= Aspistor hardenbergi =

Scientific classification
- Domain: Eukaryota
- Kingdom: Animalia
- Phylum: Chordata
- Class: Actinopterygii
- Order: Siluriformes
- Family: Ariidae
- Genus: Aspistor
- Species: A. hardenbergi

Binomial name
- Aspistor hardenbergi (Kailola, 2000)

Synonyms
- Arius hardenbergi Kailola, 2000; Hemiarius hardenbergi (Kailola, 2000)

Species of fish

Aspistor hardenbergi is a species of sea catfish in the family Ariidae. It was described by Patricia J. Kailola in 2000, originally under the genus Arius. It inhabits tropical marine and brackish waters in southern New Guinea. It reaches a maximum standard length of 25.4 cm (10.0 in).

The species epithet, "hardenbergi", was given in honour of J.D.F. Hardenberg, both for his contributions to ichthyology in the Indo-Australian region, and for his recognition that A. hardenbergi was a new species.
