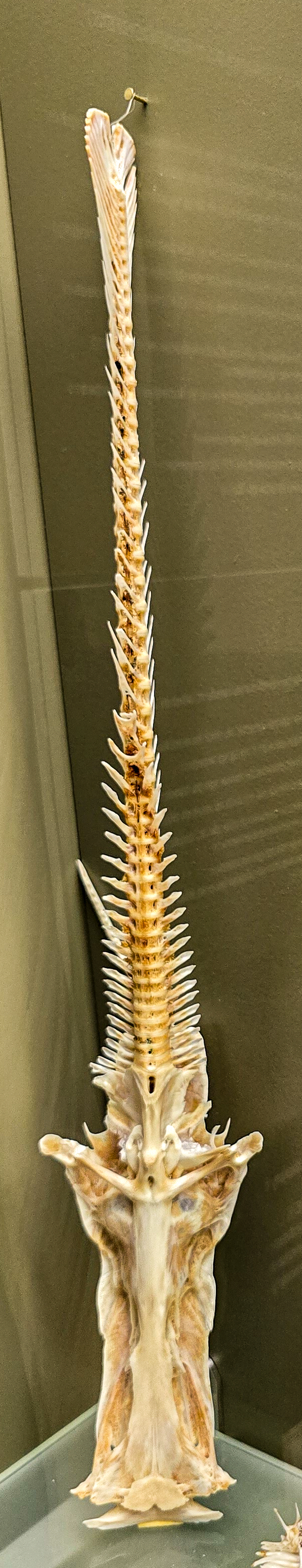

Scientific classification
- Kingdom: Animalia
- Phylum: Chordata
- Class: Actinopterygii
- Order: Siluriformes
- Family: Ariidae
- Genus: Sciades
- Species: S. proops

Binomial name
- Sciades proops (Valenciennes, 1840)

Synonyms
- Arius proops (Valenciennes, 1840); Bagrus albicans Valenciennes, 1840; Bagrus proops Valenciennes, 1840; Hexanematichthys proops (Valenciennes, 1840); Sciadeichthys proops (Valenciennes, 1840)

= Crucifix sea catfish =

Species of fish

The crucifix sea catfish (Sciades proops) — also known as the Christfish, the crucifix/crucifex catfish, the crucifixfish, or the gillbacker, — is a species of catfish in the family Ariidae.

This fish was described by Achille Valenciennes in 1840, originally under the genus Bagrus. It inhabits marine, brackish and freshwaters ranging from Brazil to Colombia. It reaches a maximum total length of 100 cm (39 in), more commonly reaching a TL of 50 cm (20 in). It reaches a maximum weight of 9 kg (20 lb). Its maximum known life expectancy is 4 years.

The crucifix sea catfish spawns from October–May. It is harvested by commercial fisheries, and its meat is marketed fresh.

== Diet ==
The crucifix sea catfish has an extensive diet, consisting largely of crustaceans such as crabs in the genera Callinectes (C. bocourti, C. danae, and C. ornatus), Petrolisthes, and Porcellana (P. sayana); shrimp and prawns in the genera Alpheus, Exhippolysmata (E. oplophoroides), Nematopalaemon (N. schmitti), Penaeus (P. schmitti), and Xiphopenaeus (X. kroyeri); and isopods. It also feeds largely on eels in the families Muraenesocidae and Ophichthidae, and other bony fish in the genera Anchoa, Aspistor (A. quadriscutis), Cathorops ( C. arenatus, C. phrygiatus and C. rugispinis), Evermannichthys, Gobioides, Plagioscion, Pseudauchenipterus (P. nodosus), Stellifer (S. microps and S. rastrifer), Synbranchus (S. marmoratus), and Trichiurus. It also feeds on annelid, polychaete and roundworms, as well as ariid larvae, insects, gastropods, and leaves and twigs from terrestrial plants.
