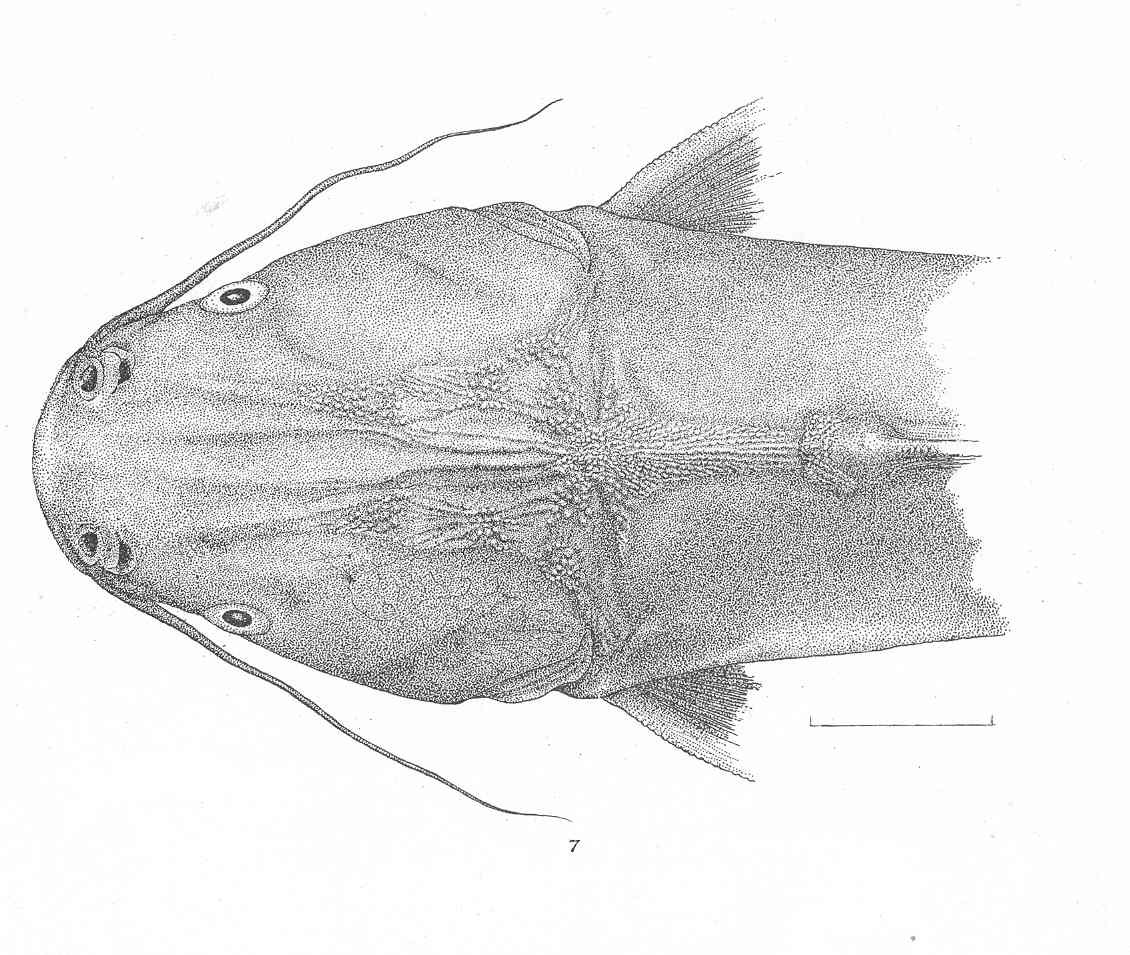

Scientific classification
- Kingdom: Animalia
- Phylum: Chordata
- Class: Actinopterygii
- Order: Siluriformes
- Family: Ariidae
- Genus: Notarius
- Species: N. lentiginosus

Binomial name
- Notarius lentiginosus (C. H. Eigenmann & R. S. Eigenmann, 1888)

Synonyms
- Arius lentiginosus (C. H. Eigenmann & R. S. Eigenmann, 1888); Galeichthys lentiginosus (C. H. Eigenmann & R. S. Eigenmann, 1888); Galeichthys xenauchen Gilbert, 1898; Tachisurus lentiginosus C. H. Eigenmann & R. S. Eigenmann, 1888

= Freckled sea catfish =

Species of fish

The freckled sea catfish (Notarius lentiginosus) is a species of catfish in the family Ariidae. It was described by Carl H. Eigenmann and Rosa Smith Eigenmann, in 1888, originally under the genus Tachisurus. It inhabits marine waters in Panama. It reaches a maximum total length of 35 cm (14 in).
