= Notarius armbrusteri =

Scientific classification
- Domain: Eukaryota
- Kingdom: Animalia
- Phylum: Chordata
- Class: Actinopterygii
- Order: Siluriformes
- Family: Ariidae
- Genus: Notarius
- Species: N. armbrusteri

Binomial name
- Notarius armbrusteri Betancur-R. & Acero P., 2006

Species of catfish

Notarius armbrusteri is a species of catfish in the family Ariidae. It was described by Ricardo Betancur-Rodríguez and Arturo Acero Pizarro in 2006. It inhabits marine waters around Buenaventura, Valle del Cauca, in Colombia. Males reach a maximum standard length of 17.7 cm (7.0 in), while females reach a maximum SL of 20.8 cm (8.2 in).

== Etymology ==
The species epithet "armbrusteri" was given in honour of Jonathan W. Armbruster, a curator at the Auburn University Museum, whom the authors credited with providing important contributions to the taxonomy of catfish in neotropical regions.
