= Amphiarius =

Scientific classification
- Kingdom: Animalia
- Phylum: Chordata
- Class: Actinopterygii
- Order: Siluriformes
- Family: Ariidae
- Subfamily: Ariinae
- Genus: Amphiarius; Marceniuk & Menezes, 2007

Type species
- Arius rugispinis Valenciennes in Cuvier & Valenciennes, 1840

Genus of fishes

Amphiarius is a genus of sea catfishes (order Siluriformes) of the family Ariidae. It includes two species, the Kukwari sea catfish, A. phrygiatus, and the softhead sea catfish, A. rugispinis.

== Taxonomy ==
A. phrygiatus and A. rugispinis were both originally described by Achille Valenciennes in 1840 as Arius species, where they have been traditionally placed. They have also been classified in the genus Notarius. Since then, it has been recognized that these two species form a natural, monophyletic grouping and were suggested to represent a new, undescribed genus. The genus Amphiarius was finally erected for these two species in 2007., though they were moved back to Notarius in 2023.

== Species ==
- Amphiarius phrygiatus (Valenciennes, 1840) (Kukwari sea catfish)
- Amphiarius rugispinis (Valenciennes, 1840) (Softhead sea catfish)

== Distribution ==
Amphiarius species are distributed in marine, brackish and fresh waters of North and eastern South America.

== Description ==
Amphiarius were distinguished from all other ariids by the presence of accessory tooth plates that are small to moderate, roughly round, and laterally located.

== Ecology ==
Like other ariid catfishes, Amphiarius species are mouthbrooders.

== Relationship to humans ==
Both species are caught and marketed for human consumption.
