= Richard Cooke (archaeologist) =

English archaeologist (1946–2023)

Richard George Cooke
- Born: October 28, 1946; Guildford, England
- Died: February 22, 2023 (aged 76)
- Education: University of London
- Scientific career
- Fields: Archaeology
- Workplaces: Smithsonian Tropical Research Institute
- Thesis: (1972)

Richard G. Cooke (28 October 1946 – 22 February 2023) was an archaeologist and senior staff scientist at the Smithsonian Tropical Research Institute (STRI) in Panama. He is known for his work on the pre-Columbian archaeology of Panama and, more generally, the Isthmo-Colombian Area, largely through holistic and interdisciplinary approaches.

== Early life and education ==
Cooke was born in Guildford, Surrey, in southern England.

He studied at the University of Bristol, where he earned his Bachelor of Arts degree in Humanities in 1968. He went on to obtain his doctorate from the University of London in 1972. His doctoral dissertation, based on fieldwork in Panama from 1969–1971, comprised an expansive literature review, archaeological survey and excavation of sites in the western part of Coclé province, wherein he focused on the reconstruction of patterns of life and cultural chronologies over long time scales in the region.

== Career ==
After receiving his doctorate, Cooke returned to Panama where he participated in a number of research and contract field excavations throughout the 1970s. Cooke was a specialist primarily in zooarchaeology and typology of ceramic styles of the "Greater Coclé semiotic tradition" of central Panama. To enable improved identification of faunal remains from archaeology sites in Panama, Cooke established a modern reference collection of fauna species of tropical America. He did extensive research on ancient fishing. He was also interested in Panamanian paleoecology, the original peopling and settlement of the tropical-forest region of the Americas, the development of agriculture, and general social development in the area. For some ten years, he led an archaeological project in Cerro Juan Díaz.

== Notable accomplishments ==
Among his many accolades, Cooke was awarded the Order of Vasco Núñez de Balboa in 2006 and elected international honorary member of the American Academy of Arts and Sciences in 2013. In 2017, he was designated a member of the Order of the British Empire. His contributions to Central American archaeology were celebrated in a conference held in San José, Costa Rica, in 2017: "Tras una Herencia Cultural Milenaria: Contribuciones de Richard Cooke a la Arqueología del Área Istmo-Colombiana".

== Selected publications ==
- Sugiyama, Nawa, M. F. Martínez-Polanco, C. A. France, & R. G. Cooke. "Domesticated landscapes of the neotropics: Isotope signatures of human-animal relationships in pre-Columbian Panama". Journal of Anthropological Archaeology. 59 (2020): 101195.
- Smith-Guzmán, N., & R. Cooke. "Cold-water diving in the tropics? External auditory exotoses among the Pre-Colombian inhabitants of Panama". American Journal of Physical Anthropology. doi:SI-659-2018 (2018).
- Cooke, Richard, A. Ranere, G. Pearson, & R. Dickau. "Radiocarbon chronology of early human settlement on the Isthmus of Panama (13,000–7000 BP) with comments on cultural affinities, environments, subsistence, and technological change". Quaternary International. 301 (2013): 3–22.
- Cooke, Richard G. "Arqueología en Panamá (1888-2002)". Panama: cien años de República (2004).
- Cooke, Richard G. "Rich, poor, shaman, child: Animals, rank, and status in the 'Gran Coclé' culture area of pre-Columbian Panama". Behaviour behind Bones. The Zooarchaeology of Ritual, Religion, Status and Identity (2004): 271–284.
- Cooke, Richard G., and Anthony J. Ranere. "Precolumbian fishing on the Pacific coast of Panama". Pacific Latin America in Prehistory: the evolution of archaic and formative cultures (1999).
- Cooke, Richard, and Anthony J. Ranere. "Prehistoric human adaptations to the seasonally dry forests of Panama." World Archaeology 24.1 (1992): 114–133.
- Piperno, D. R., Clary, K. H., Cooke, R. G., Ranere, A. J., & Weiland, D. "Preceramic maize in central Panama: phytolith and pollen evidence." American Anthropologist. 87.4 (1985): 871–878.

== Taxon named in his honor ==
- Notarius cookei is a species of catfish in the family Ariidae. It inhabits brackish and freshwaters in Colombia, Costa Rica, and Panama.
