= Notarius biffi =

Scientific classification
- Domain: Eukaryota
- Kingdom: Animalia
- Phylum: Chordata
- Class: Actinopterygii
- Order: Siluriformes
- Family: Ariidae
- Genus: Notarius
- Species: N. biffi

Binomial name
- Notarius biffi Betancur-R.. & Acero P., 2004

Species of catfish

Notarius biffi is a species of catfish in the family Ariidae. It was described by Ricardo Betancur-Rodríguez and Arturo Acero Pizarro in 2004. It inhabits marine and brackish waters in El Salvador, Honduras, Costa Rica, and Nicaragua, at a depth range of 9 to 30 m (30 to 98 ft). It reaches a maximum standard length of 32.4 cm (12.8 in). The IUCN redlist currently lists the species as Least Concern.

== Etymology ==
The species epithet "biffi" is derived from the nickname of Eldredge Bermingham, an ichthyologist and ornithologist affiliated with the Smithsonian Tropical Research Institute, whom the authors credit with making important contributions to the biogeography of fish in the neotropical regions.
