= Notarius insculptus =

Scientific classification
- Domain: Eukaryota
- Kingdom: Animalia
- Phylum: Chordata
- Class: Actinopterygii
- Order: Siluriformes
- Family: Ariidae
- Genus: Notarius
- Species: N. insculptus

Binomial name
- Notarius insculptus (Jordan & Gilbert, 1883)

Synonyms
- Arius insculptus Jordan & Gilbert, 1883; Arius insculpta Jordan & Gilbert, 1883; Galeichthys insculptus (Jordan & Gilbert, 1883); Tachisurus insculptus (Jordan & Gilbert, 1883); Netuma insculpta (Jordan & Gilbert, 1883)

Species of fish

Notarius insculptus is a species of catfish in the family Ariidae. It was described by David Starr Jordan and Charles Henry Gilbert in 1883, originally under the genus Arius. It inhabits marine waters in Panama. It reaches a maximum total length of 32.5 cm (12.8 in).
