= Mayan sea catfish =

Conservation status
- Least Concern (IUCN 3.1)

Scientific classification
- Kingdom: Animalia
- Phylum: Chordata
- Class: Actinopterygii
- Order: Siluriformes
- Family: Ariidae
- Genus: Ariopsis
- Species: A. assimilis

Binomial name
- Ariopsis assimilis (Günther, 1864)

Synonyms
- Arius assimilis Günther, 1864; Galeichthys assimilis (Günther, 1864); Hexanematichthys assimilis (Günther, 1864); Sciades assimilis (Günther, 1864)

Species of fish

The Mayan sea catfish (Ariopsis assimilis), also known as the Mayan catfish or the Maya sea catfish, is a species of sea catfish in the family Ariidae. It was described by Albert Günther in 1864, originally under the genus Arius. It is found in tropical brackish and freshwater bodies in Belize, Costa Rica, Guatemala, Honduras, Mexico, Nicaragua, and Panama. It can reach a maximum total length of 35 cm (14 in), but more commonly reaches a TL of 25 cm (9.8 in).

The Mayan sea catfish is of minor commercial interest to fisheries, and its meat is generally consumed fresh.
