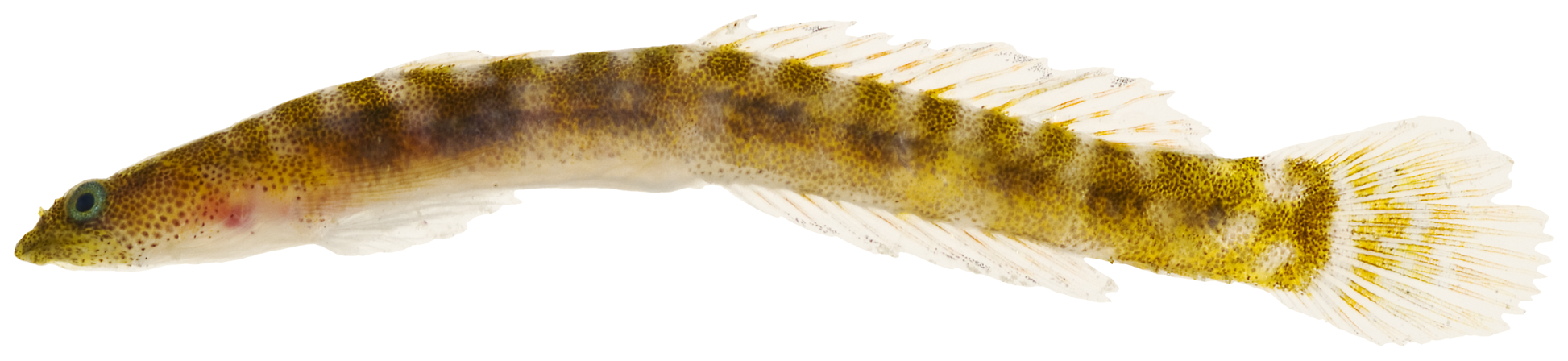
- Evermannichthys metzelaari

Scientific classification
- Kingdom: Animalia
- Phylum: Chordata
- Class: Actinopterygii
- Order: Gobiiformes
- Family: Gobiidae
- Genus: Evermannichthys; Metzelaar, 1919

Type species
- Evermannichthys spongicola (Radcliffe, 1917)

Synonyms
- Radcliffella C. L. Hubbs, 1921

= Evermannichthys =

Genus of fishes

Evermannichthys is a genus of gobies native to the Atlantic coast of the Americas including the Caribbean and the Gulf of Mexico.

== Species ==
There are currently five recognized species in this genus:

- Evermannichthys bicolor Thacker, 2001
- Evermannichthys convictor J. E. Böhlke & C. R. Robins, 1969 (Tenant goby)
- Evermannichthys metzelaari C. L. Hubbs, 1923 (Sponge goby)
- Evermannichthys silus J. E. Böhlke & C. R. Robins, 1969 (Pugnose goby)
- Evermannichthys spongicola (Radcliffe, 1917)
