= Amphiarius rugispinis =

Softhead sea catfish

Conservation status
- Least Concern (IUCN 3.1)

Scientific classification
- Kingdom: Animalia
- Phylum: Chordata
- Class: Actinopterygii
- Order: Siluriformes
- Family: Ariidae
- Genus: Amphiarius
- Species: A. rugispinis

Binomial name
- Amphiarius rugispinis (Valenciennes, 1840)

Synonyms
- Arius rugispinis Valenciennes, 1840; Cathorops rugispinis (Valenciennes, 1840); Hexanematichthys rugispinis (Valenciennes, 1840); Notarius rugispinis (Valenciennes, 1840); Tachysurus atroplumbeus Fowler, 1931

Species of fish

Amphiarius rugispinis, the softhead sea catfish, is a species of sea catfish which is found along the northern coast of South America. It is found chiefly in turbid waters of estuaries and around river mouths; it originates from brackish and marine waters of Trinidad and Tobago, Guyana, Suriname, French Guiana, and Brazil. This species grows to about 45 cm (18 in) TL. Reproduction in A. rugispinis appears to be between September and November. The diameter of the eggs is 14–15 millimetres (9/16 in), numbering about 30–35 per female.
