= Caribbean sculptured sea catfish =

Conservation status
- Vulnerable (IUCN 3.1)

Scientific classification
- Kingdom: Animalia
- Phylum: Chordata
- Class: Actinopterygii
- Order: Siluriformes
- Family: Ariidae
- Genus: Notarius
- Species: N. neogranatensis

Binomial name
- Notarius neogranatensis (Acero P. & Betancur-R., 2002)

Synonyms
- Arius neogranatensis Acero P. & Betancur-R., 2002

Species of fish

The Caribbean sculptured sea catfish (Notarius neogranatensis) is a species of catfish in the family Ariidae. It was described by Arturo Acero Pizarro and Ricardo Betancur-Rodríguez in 2002, originally under the genus Arius. It inhabits brackish and marine waters in Colombia, on the Caribbean coast. It reaches a maximum total length of 36 cm (14 in).
