= Chilhuil sea catfish =

Conservation status
- Least Concern (IUCN 3.1)

Scientific classification
- Kingdom: Animalia
- Phylum: Chordata
- Class: Actinopterygii
- Order: Siluriformes
- Family: Ariidae
- Genus: Bagre
- Species: B. panamensis

Binomial name
- Bagre panamensis (Gill, 1863)

Synonyms
- Aelurichthys panamensis Gill, 1863; Ailurichthys panamensis (Gill, 1863); Anemanotus panamensis (Gill, 1863); Felichthys panamensis (Gill, 1863); Aelurichthys nuchalis Günther, 1864; Aelurichthys scutatus Regan, 1907; Aelurichthys isthmensis Regan, 1907

Species of fish

Chilhuil sea catfish (Bagre panamensis), also called the chihuil, is a species of sea catfish in the family Ariidae. It was described by Theodore Gill in 1863, originally under the genus Aelurichthys. It inhabits subtropical marine and brackish waters in the eastern Pacific region, including California, USA; Colombia, Guatemala, Peru, El Salvador, Costa Rica, Ecuador, Honduras, Nicaragua, Panama and Mexico. It dwells at a depth range of 3 to 177 m (9.8 to 580.7 ft), most often between 10 and 60 m (33 and 197 ft). It reaches a maximum total length of 51 cm (20 in).

The chilhuil sea catfish is of important commercial value to fisheries, and is sold fresh. It has been consumed since pre-Columbian times. Due to its wide distribution in the eastern Pacific, as well as a lack of known threats or observed population decline, the IUCN redlist currently lists the species as Least Concern. It notes that the species' range partially includes areas under marine protection.
