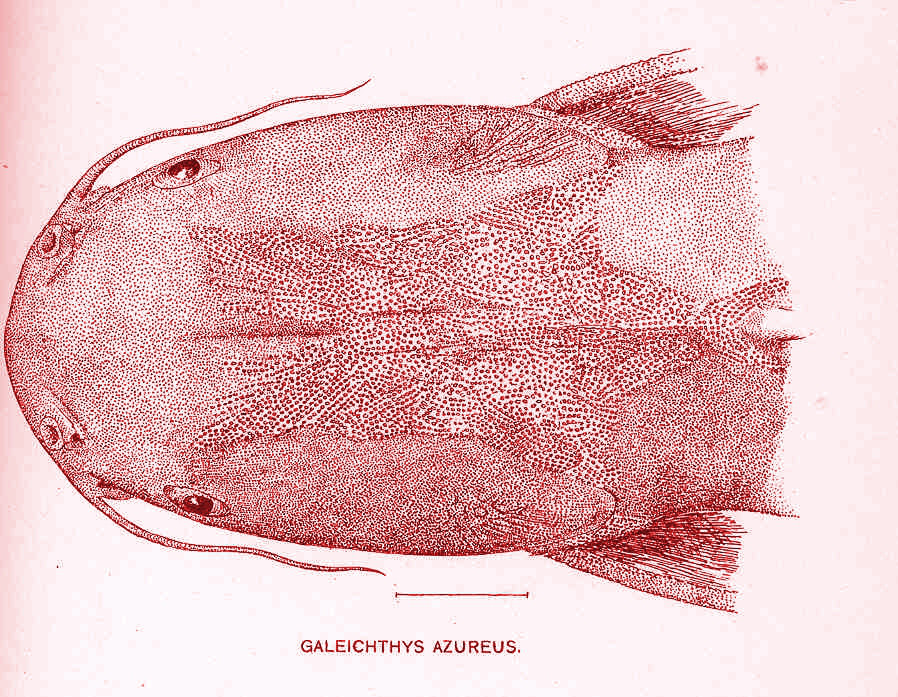

Conservation status
- Least Concern (IUCN 3.1)

Scientific classification
- Kingdom: Animalia
- Phylum: Chordata
- Class: Actinopterygii
- Order: Siluriformes
- Family: Ariidae
- Genus: Ariopsis
- Species: A. guatemalensis

Binomial name
- Ariopsis guatemalensis (Günther, 1864)

Synonyms
- Arius guatemalensis Günther, 1864; Galeichthys guatemalensis (Günther, 1864); Hexanematichthys guatemalensis (Günther, 1864); Sciades guatemalensis (Günther, 1864); Tachisurus guatemalensis (Günther, 1864); Arius caerulescens Günther, 1864; Galeichthys coerulescens (Günther, 1864); Hexanematichthys coerulescens (Günther, 1864); Tachisurus coerulescens (Günther, 1864); Galeichthys azureus Jordan & Williams, 1895

= Blue sea catfish =

Species of fish

The blue sea catfish (Ariopsis guatemalensis), also known as the widehead sea catfish, is a species of sea catfish in the family Ariidae. It was described by Albert Günther in 1864, originally under the genus Arius. It is found in tropical marine, brackish and freshwater along the Pacific coast in Central America, ranging from Mexico to Panama as well as Nicaragua. It dwells at a depth range of 0 to 20 m (0 to 70 ft). It reaches a maximum total length of 37 cm (15 in).

The blue sea catfish is rated as Least Concern by the IUCN redlist, due to its wide distribution, frequency in some areas, and lack of observed population decline. It is noted, however, that "extensive disturbance" of estuarine areas may pose localized threats to the species.
