= Notarius cookei =

Conservation status
- Vulnerable (IUCN 3.1)

Scientific classification
- Kingdom: Animalia
- Phylum: Chordata
- Class: Actinopterygii
- Order: Siluriformes
- Family: Ariidae
- Genus: Notarius
- Species: N. cookei

Binomial name
- Notarius cookei (Acero P. & Betancur-R., 2002)

Synonyms
- Arius cookei Acero P. & Betancur-R., 2002

Species of fish

Notarius cookei is a species of catfish in the family Ariidae. It was described by Arturo Acero Pizarro and Ricardo Betancur-Rodríguez in 2002, originally under the genus Arius. It inhabits brackish and freshwaters in Colombia, Costa Rica, and Panama, at a maximum depth of 20 m (66 ft). It reaches a maximum standard length of 42.8 cm (16.9 in).

== Etymology ==
The fish is named in honor of British archaeologist Richard Cooke (1946–2023), of the Smithsonian Tropical Research Institute, because of his contribution to the knowledge of eastern Pacific ariids.

The IUCN redlist currently lists the species as Vulnerable, citing residential and commercial developments, water pollution and logging practices as its main threats.
