= Notarius luniscutis =

Conservation status
- Least Concern (IUCN 3.1)

Scientific classification
- Kingdom: Animalia
- Phylum: Chordata
- Class: Actinopterygii
- Order: Siluriformes
- Family: Ariidae
- Genus: Notarius
- Species: N. luniscutis

Binomial name
- Notarius luniscutis (Valenciennes in Cuvier and Valenciennes, 1840)

Synonyms
- Aspistor luniscutis

Species of fish

Notarius luniscutis is a species of sea catfish found along the coasts of French Guiana and Brazil. This species attains a length of 120 cm (47 in) TL.
