= Flathead sea catfish =

Scientific classification
- Kingdom: Animalia
- Phylum: Chordata
- Class: Actinopterygii
- Order: Siluriformes
- Family: Ariidae
- Genus: Notarius
- Species: N. planiceps

Binomial name
- Notarius planiceps (Steindachner, 1876)

Synonyms
- Arius planiceps Steindachner, 1876; Ariopsis planiceps (Steindachner, 1876); Netuma planiceps (Steindachner, 1876); Galeichthys planiceps (Steindachner, 1876); Tachisurus planiceps (Steindachner, 1876)

Species of fish

The flathead sea catfish (Notarius planiceps) is a species of catfish in the family Ariidae. It was described by Franz Steindachner in 1876, originally under the genus Arius. It inhabits rivers, estuaries, and marine waters on the Pacific coast, from Mexico to Panama, at a maximum depth of 60 m (200 ft). It reaches a maximum total length of 60 cm (24 in). It is currently ranked by the IUCN redlist as being of Least Concern, due to a lack of known major threats for the species.

The flathead sea catfish feeds off of benthic invertebrates. Its meat is marketed fresh.
