= Thomas sea catfish =

Conservation status
- Least Concern (IUCN 3.1)

Scientific classification
- Kingdom: Animalia
- Phylum: Chordata
- Class: Actinopterygii
- Order: Siluriformes
- Family: Ariidae
- Genus: Notarius
- Species: N. grandicassis

Binomial name
- Notarius grandicassis (Valenciennes, 1840)

Synonyms
- Arius grandicassis Valenciennes, 1840; Arius stricticassis Valenciennes, 1840; Arius vandeli Puyo, 1936; Notarius stricticassis (Valenciennes, 1840)

Species of fish

The Thomas sea catfish (Notarius grandicassis) is a species of catfish in the family Ariidae. It was described by Achille Valenciennes in 1840, originally under the genus Arius. It inhabits mud on the floors of brackish and marine waters between the Gulf of Venezuela and the Amazon River, at a depth range of 1 to 20 m (3 ft 3 in to 65 ft 7 in). It reaches a maximum total length of 63 cm (25 in), more commonly reaching a TL of 40 cm (16 in).

The Thomas sea catfish is currently ranked as Least Concern by the IUCN redlist. It spawns during the months of May and June. Its meat is of minor commercial value, and is marketed fresh.
