= Flapnose sea catfish =

Conservation status
- Least Concern (IUCN 3.1)

Scientific classification
- Kingdom: Animalia
- Phylum: Chordata
- Class: Actinopterygii
- Order: Siluriformes
- Family: Ariidae
- Genus: Sciades
- Species: S. dowii

Binomial name
- Sciades dowii (Gill, 1863)

Synonyms
- Arius alatus Steindachner, 1876; Arius dowii (Gill, 1863); Arius dowi (Gill, 1863); Arius dovii (Gill, 1863); Galeichthys dowii (Gill, 1863); Galeichthys dovii (Gill, 1863); Hexanematichthys dowii (Gill, 1863); Leptarius dowii Gill, 1863; Sciadeichthys dowii (Gill, 1863); Selenaspis dowii (Gill, 1863); Tachisurus dowii (Gill, 1863)

Species of fish

The flapnose sea catfish (Sciades dowii), also known as the brown sea catfish, is a species of catfish in the family Ariidae. It was described by Theodore Gill in 1863, originally under the genus Leptarius. It inhabits rivers and estuaries in Ecuador, Colombia, Guatemala, Costa Rica, El Salvador, Panama, Honduras, Nicaragua, Mexico, and Peru. It dwells at a depth range of 0 to 15 m (0 to 50 ft). It reaches a maximum total length of 90 cm (35 in), more commonly reaching a TL of 50 cm (20 in).

The diet of the flapnose sea catfish includes small finfish, fish scales, and benthic invertebrates. Due to a lack of known major threats to the species, it is currently ranked as Least Concern by the IUCN redlist. It has been harvested for its meat since Pre-Columbian times, and remains a commercially important foodfish to date. It is marketed both fresh and dried-salted.

== Etymology ==
The fish is named in honor of John Melmoth Dow (1827-1892) a Panama Railroad Company ship captain and an amateur naturalist, who presented the type specimen to the Smithsonian Institution.
