= Amphiarius phrygiatus =

Kukwari sea catfish

Conservation status
- Least Concern (IUCN 3.1)

Scientific classification
- Kingdom: Animalia
- Phylum: Chordata
- Class: Actinopterygii
- Order: Siluriformes
- Family: Ariidae
- Genus: Amphiarius
- Species: A. phrygiatus

Binomial name
- Amphiarius phrygiatus (Valenciennes, 1840)

Synonyms
- Arius dieperinki Bleeker, 1862; Arius phrygiatus Valenciennes, 1840; Cathorops phrygiatus (Valenciennes, 1840); Notarius phrygiatus (Valenciennes, 1840)

Species of fish

Amphiarius phrygiatus, the Kukwari sea catfish, is a species of sea catfish which occurs in brackish estuaries with very low salinities, nearly entering freshwater, and is found on shallow muddy bottoms, ranging through Venezuela, Guyana, Suriname, French Guiana, and Brazil. It grows to about 30 centimetres (12 in) TL. As with other Arriid catfishes this species is a mouthbrooder. The female A. phrygiatus lays her eggs in a gelatinous mass on a sandy depression for the male to collect to mouthbrood. This species is caught for human consumption.
