= Red sea catfish =

Conservation status
- Least Concern (IUCN 3.1)

Scientific classification
- Kingdom: Animalia
- Phylum: Chordata
- Class: Actinopterygii
- Order: Siluriformes
- Family: Ariidae
- Genus: Bagre
- Species: B. pinnimaculatus

Binomial name
- Bagre pinnimaculatus (Steindachner, 1876)

Synonyms
- Aelurichthys pinnimaculatus Steindachner, 1876; Felichthys pinnimaculatus (Steindachner, 1876); Galeichthys eydouxii Valenciennes, 1840; Ailurichthys eydouxii (Valenciennes, 1840)

Species of fish

The red sea catfish (Bagre pinnimaculatus), also called the long-barbeled sea catfish, is a species of sea catfish in the family Ariidae. It was described by Franz Steindachner in 1876, originally under the genus Aelurichthys. It inhabits tropical marine, brackish and freshwater in the eastern-central and southeastern Pacific regions, including Mexico, Colombia, Ecuador, Costa Rica, Guatemala, Honduras, El Salvador, Panama, Nicaragua, and Peru. It dwells at a maximum depth of 20 m (66 ft). It reaches a maximum total length of 95 cm (37 in), but more commonly reaches 30 cm (12 in).

The diet of the red sea catfish at a recruitment age consists of the scales of bony fish. It is of important commercial value to fisheries, and has been consumed since the pre-Columbian era. It is sold fresh, dried, smoked, and salted, but is often labelled as other species including those in the family Sciaenidae, due to the higher market price.

Due to its wide distribution and abundance in many areas in the eastern Pacific, as well as its lack of known threats or observed population decline, the IUCN Red List currently rates the red sea catfish as least concern. It notes that the species' range includes a number of areas under marine protection.
