= Chomba sea catfish =

Scientific classification
- Domain: Eukaryota
- Kingdom: Animalia
- Phylum: Chordata
- Class: Actinopterygii
- Order: Siluriformes
- Family: Ariidae
- Genus: Notarius
- Species: N. osculus

Binomial name
- Notarius osculus (Jordan & Gilbert, 1883)

Synonyms
- Arius osculus Jordan & Gilbert, 1883; Hexanematichthys osculus (Jordan & Gilbert, 1883); Galeichthys osculus (Jordan & Gilbert, 1883); Tachisurus osculus (Jordan & Gilbert, 1883); Netuma oscula (Jordan & Gilbert, 1883)

Species of fish

The Chomba sea catfish (Notarius osculus) is a species of catfish in the family Ariidae. It was described by David Starr Jordan and Charles Henry Gilbert in 1883, originally under the genus Arius. It inhabits coastal marine and brackish waters in Costa Rica and Panama. It reaches a maximum standard length of 28 cm (11 in).
