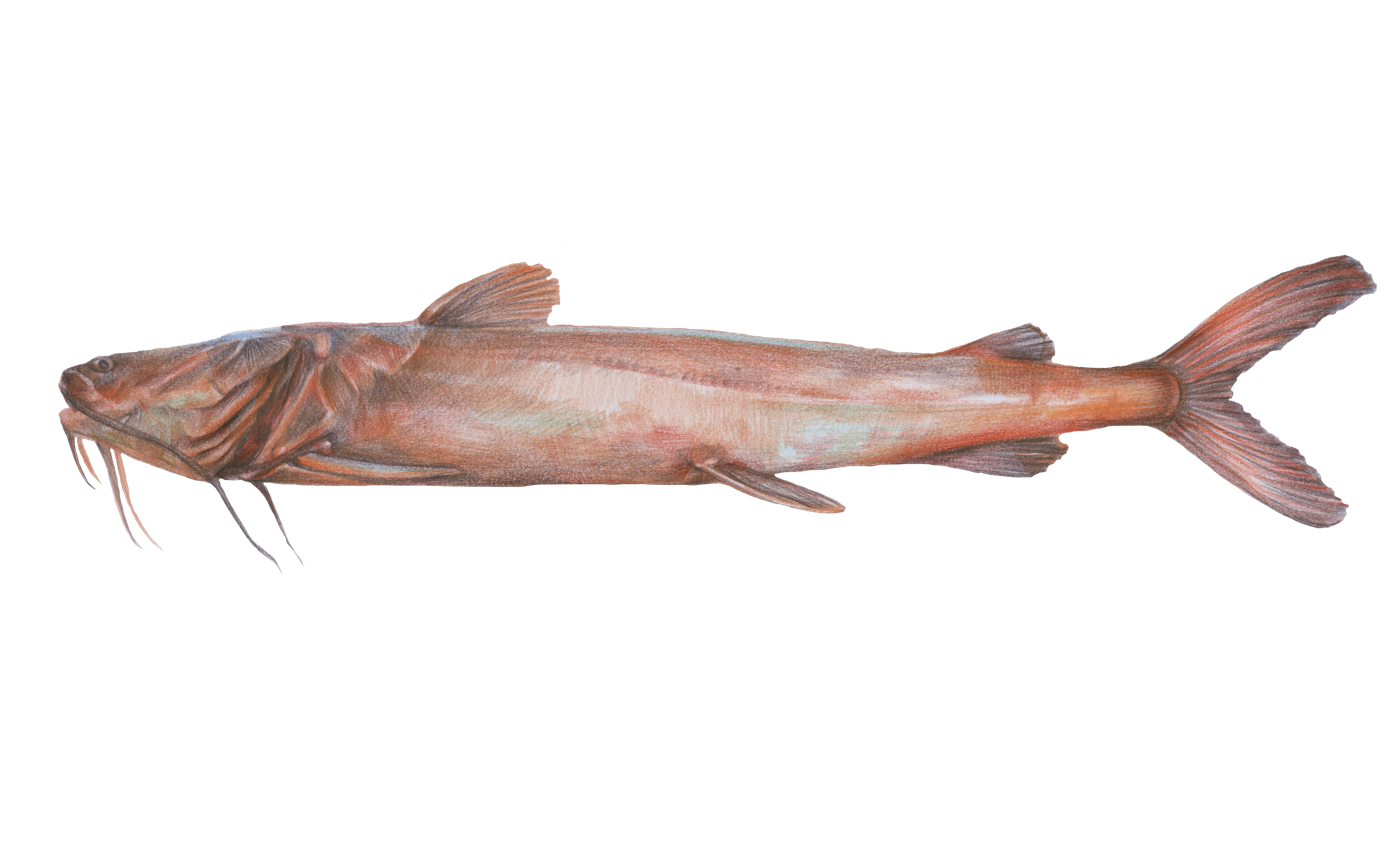

Conservation status
- Data Deficient (IUCN 3.1)

Scientific classification
- Kingdom: Animalia
- Phylum: Chordata
- Class: Actinopterygii
- Order: Siluriformes
- Family: Ariidae
- Genus: Sciades
- Species: S. passany

Binomial name
- Sciades passany (Valenciennes, 1840)

Synonyms
- Bagrus passany Valenciennes, 1840; Arius passany (Valenciennes, 1840); Hexanematichthys passany (Valenciennes, 1840); Selenaspis passany (Valenciennes, 1840)

= Passany sea catfish =

Species of fish

The Passany sea catfish (Sciades passany) is a species of catfish in the family Ariidae. It was described by Achille Valenciennes in 1840, originally under the genus Bagrus. It occurs in estuaries and coastal marine waters in Brazil, Venezuela, Suriname, French Guiana, Guyana, and Trinidad and Tobago. It reaches a maximum total length of 100 cm (39 in), more commonly reaching a TL of 50 cm (20 in). It reaches a maximum weight of 15 kg (33 lb). Although not specifically fished for, it is eaten when caught. It may be a host for the parasite Amapacanthus amazonicus.

The passany sea catfish is currently ranked as Data Deficient by the IUCN redlist, but notes that although the species is not of significant interest to fisheries, it possibly has a slow maturation rate due to its size, which may affect its potential for overexploitation.
