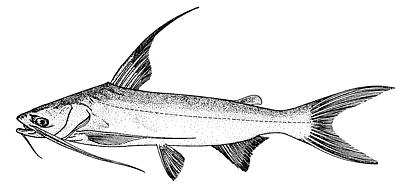
- Bagre marinus

Scientific classification
- Kingdom: Animalia
- Phylum: Chordata
- Class: Actinopterygii
- Order: Siluriformes
- Family: Ariidae
- Subfamily: Bagreinae; Schultz, 1944
- Genus: Bagre; Cloquet, 1816

Type species
- Silurus bagre Linnaeus, 1766

= Bagre (fish) =

Bagre Temporal range: Early Miocene to present

Genus of fishes

Bagre is a genus of sea catfishes found along the Atlantic and Pacific coasts of the Americas from southern North America to northern South America. They are the only member of the subfamily Bagreinae. Currently, five species are described:

- Bagre bagre (Linnaeus, 1766) (coco sea catfish)
- Bagre filamentosus (Swainson, 1839)
- Bagre marinus (Mitchill, 1815) (gafftopsail catfish)
- Bagre panamensis (T. N. Gill, 1863) (Chilhuil sea catfish)
- Bagre pinnimaculatus (Steindachner, 1877) (red sea catfish)

The earliest known fossil remains of Bagre are from the Early Miocene-aged Calvert Formation of Maryland, US and the Pungo River Formation of North Carolina, US. However, their exclusively American distribution, combined with the ancient divergences assumed among subfamilies of the Ariidae, suggest that the subfamily may have diverged from the Ariinae during the early-mid Cretaceous following the breakup of West Gondwana, isolating the Bagreinae around South America.
