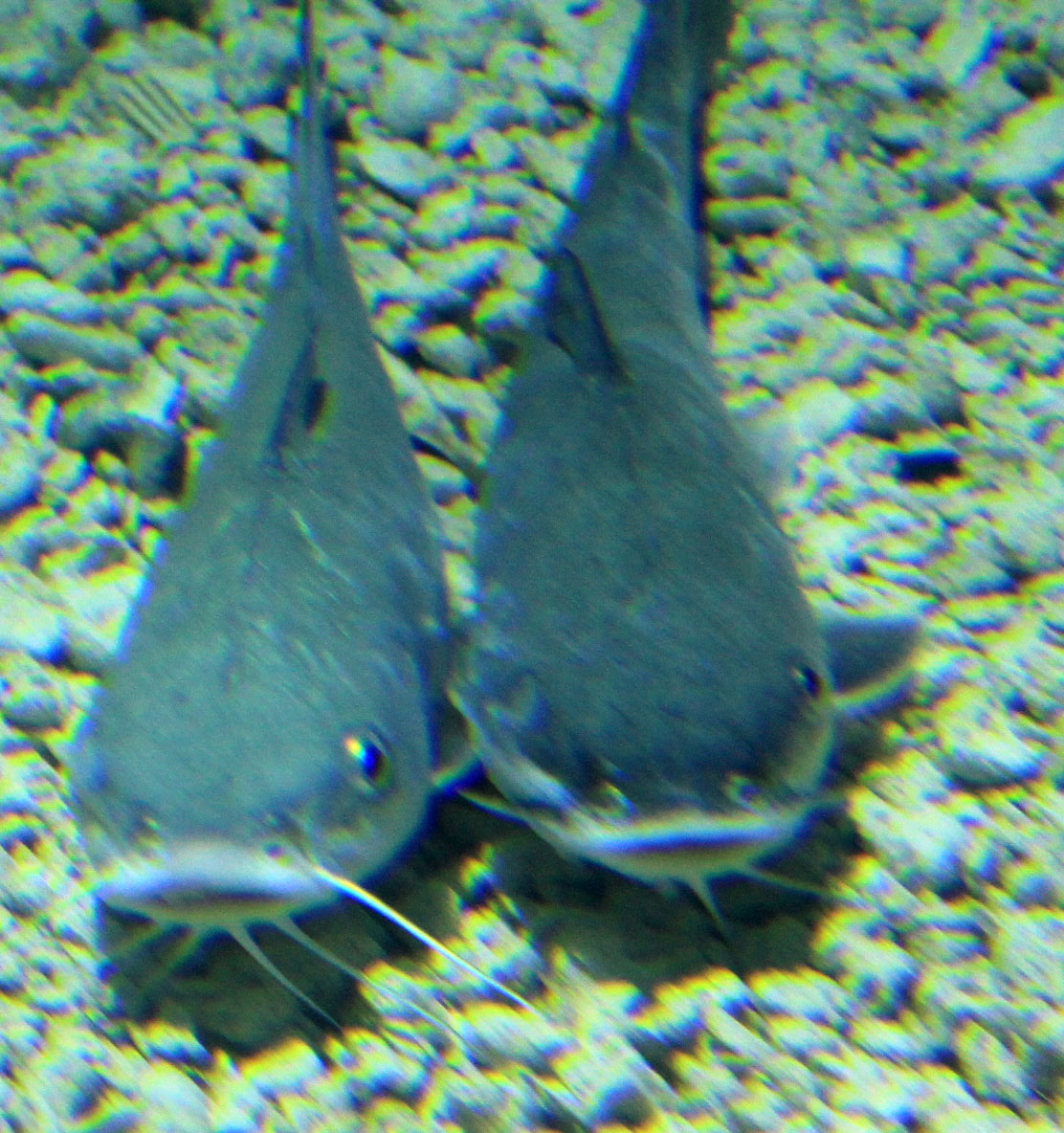
- Ariopsis felis

Scientific classification
- Kingdom: Animalia
- Phylum: Chordata
- Class: Actinopterygii
- Order: Siluriformes
- Family: Ariidae
- Subfamily: Ariinae
- Genus: Ariopsis; T. N. Gill, 1861

Type species
- Silurus felis Linnaeus, 1766

= Ariopsis (fish) =

Ariopsis Temporal range: Middle Miocene to present

Genus of fishes

Ariopsis is a genus of sea catfishes found along the Pacific and Atlantic coasts of the Americas. The genus has been merged with Sciades by some authorities.

== Species ==
There are currently eight described extant species in this genus:

- Ariopsis assimilis (Günther, 1864) (Mayan sea catfish)
- Ariopsis canteri Acero P., Betancur-R & Marceniuk, 2017
- Ariopsis felis (Linnaeus, 1766) (Hardhead sea catfish)
- Ariopsis gilberti (Jordan & Williams, 1895)
- Ariopsis guatemalensis (Günther, 1864) (Blue sea catfish)
- Ariopsis jimenezi Marceniuk, Acero P., Cooke & Betancur-R, 2017
- Ariopsis seemanni (Günther, 1864) (Tete sea catfish)
- Ariopsis simonsi (Starks, 1906)

The extinct species †Ariopsis stauroforus (Lynn & Melland, 1939) is known from the Middle Miocene-aged Calvert Formation of Maryland, US.
