= Colorado Basin, Argentina =

Argentinian sedimentary basin

Colorado Basin
- Cuenca del Colorado
- Location of the basin in Argentina
- Coordinates: 41°30′S 61°00′W
- Etymology: Colorado River
- Country: Argentina
- States: Buenos Aires & Río Negro Provinces
- Cities: Bahía Blanca, Viedma

Characteristics
- On/Offshore: Both
- Boundaries: Ventania High (N); Argentina Basin (E); Rawson/Río Negro High (S); San Rafael Block (W)
- Part of: South Atlantic rift basins
- Area: ~180,000 km^{2} (69,000 sq mi)

Hydrology
- Sea: South Atlantic
- Rivers: Río Negro & Colorado Rivers

Geology
- Basin type: Passive margin on rift basin
- Plate: South American
- Orogeny: Break-up of Pangea
- Age: Early Cretaceous-Quaternary
- Stratigraphy: Stratigraphy
- Field: none

The Colorado Basin (Spanish: Cuenca del Colorado) is a sedimentary basin located in northeastern Patagonia. The basin stretches across an area of approximately 180,000 square kilometres (69,000 sq mi), of which 37,000 square kilometres (14,000 sq mi) onshore in the southern Buenos Aires Province and the easternmost Río Negro Province extending offshore in the South Atlantic Ocean.

The basin comprises a sedimentary succession dating from the Permian (pre-rift stage) and Early Cretaceous (rift stage) to the Quaternary, representing the passive margin tectonic phase of the basin history. The Mesozoic rifting in the basin resulted from the break-up of Pangea and the formation of the South Atlantic. Long hiatuses exist in the succession.

The basin is of paleontological significance for hosting fossiliferous stratigraphic units dating to the Late Miocene. The Arroyo Chasicó Formation defines the Chasicoan South American land mammal age and contains a rich mammal and other vertebrate fauna. The contemporaneous Cerro Azul Formation has provided fossil rodents, armadillos and opossums. The Middle to Late Miocene Gran Bajo del Gualicho Formation contains vertebrate fossils of the cetacean Preaulophyseter gualichensis. The Río Negro Formation has provided fossils of the glyptodont Plohophorus figuratus. The Permian succession in the basin has provided flora microfossils.

Contrasting with the South Atlantic passive margin basins to the north (Santos Basin in southern Brazil) and south; Golfo San Jorge and Austral Basins, the Colorado Basin does not produce hydrocarbons. Exploration for petroleum started in the 1940 with the drilling of two onshore wells and several onshore and offshore wells have been drilled in the 1960s, 1970s and 1990s. The main source rocks are found in the Permian succession, with reservoir rocks the Colorado Formation. Seals are provided by the Early Paleocene Pedro Luro Formation.

== Description ==
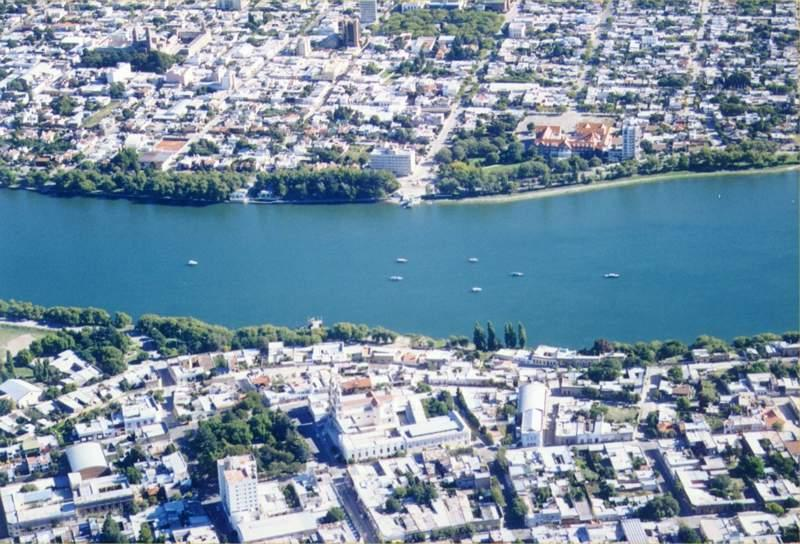
View of Viedma and Carmen de Patagones, separated by the Río Negro

The Colorado Basin stretches across an approximate area of 180,000 square kilometres (69,000 sq mi) with about 37,000 square kilometres (14,000 sq mi) onshore, underlying the southernmost Buenos Aires Province and the southeasternmost Río Negro Province. Cities inside the basin are Bahía Blanca and Carmen de Patagones in Buenos Aires Province and Viedma in Río Negro Province, the earliest founded city in Patagonia. The onshore part of the basin is crossed by the eponymous Colorado and Río Negro rivers. Surrounding the Río Negro, many salt lakes are present in the basin.

Some authors group the basin together with the Claromecó Basin to the north. The offshore part of the Colorado Basin laterally correlates with and gradually ranges into the sub-parallel Salado Basin and the deeper offshore Argentina Basin. The offshore extension of the basin into neighboring basins led to different definitions of its area, some authors use a surface area of 125,000 square kilometres (48,000 sq mi).

The Colorado Basin is bound to the north by the Ventania High, Sierra de la Ventana, or Sierras Australes, separating the basin from the Claromecó Basin, and to the south by the Rawson, or Río Negro High. In the northwest, the basin grades into the Macachín Basin and the western boundary is formed by the San Rafael Block.

=== Basin evolution ===
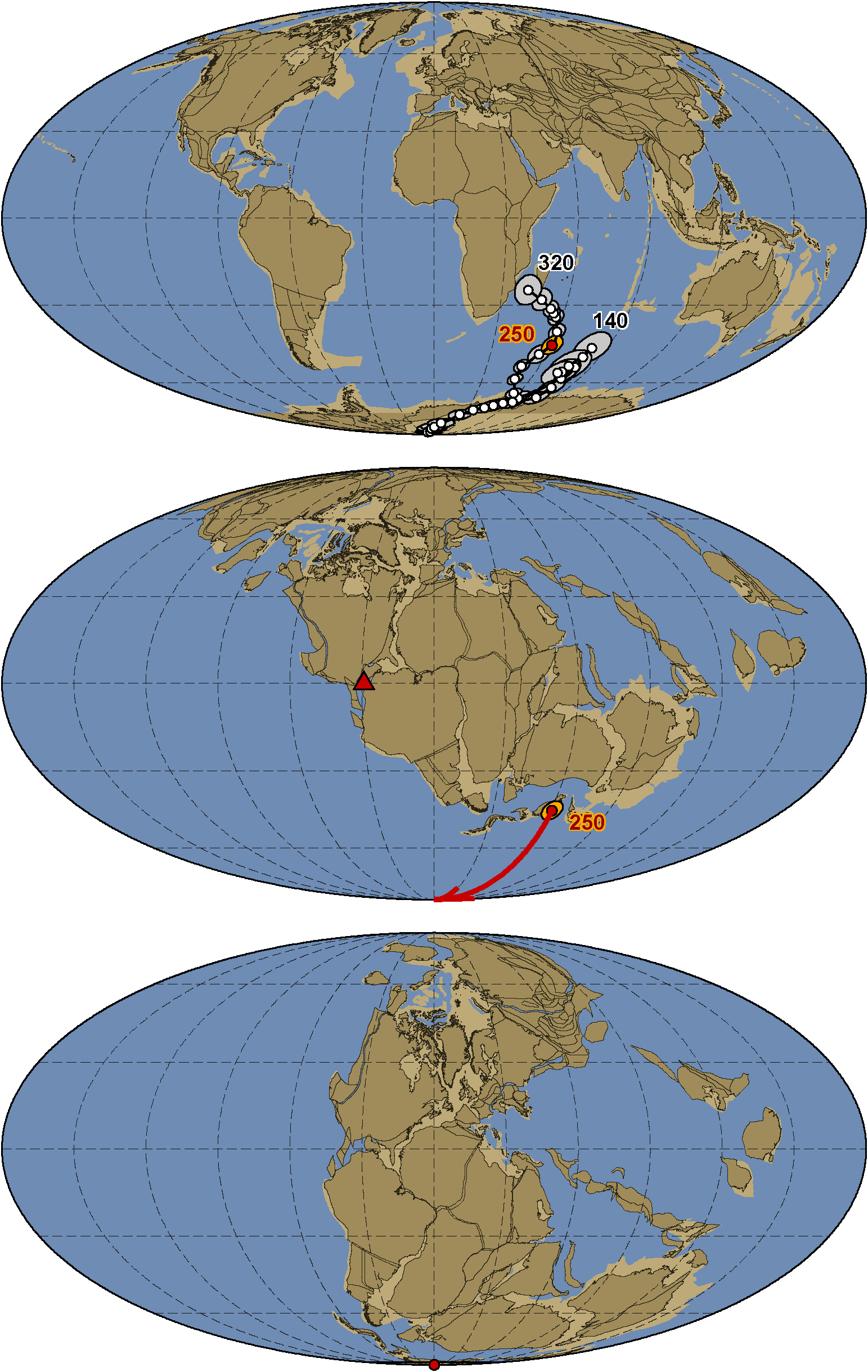
Pangea in the Permian (~250 Ma). The Colorado Basin experiences glaciations and a marine transgressive phase in the south polar region.

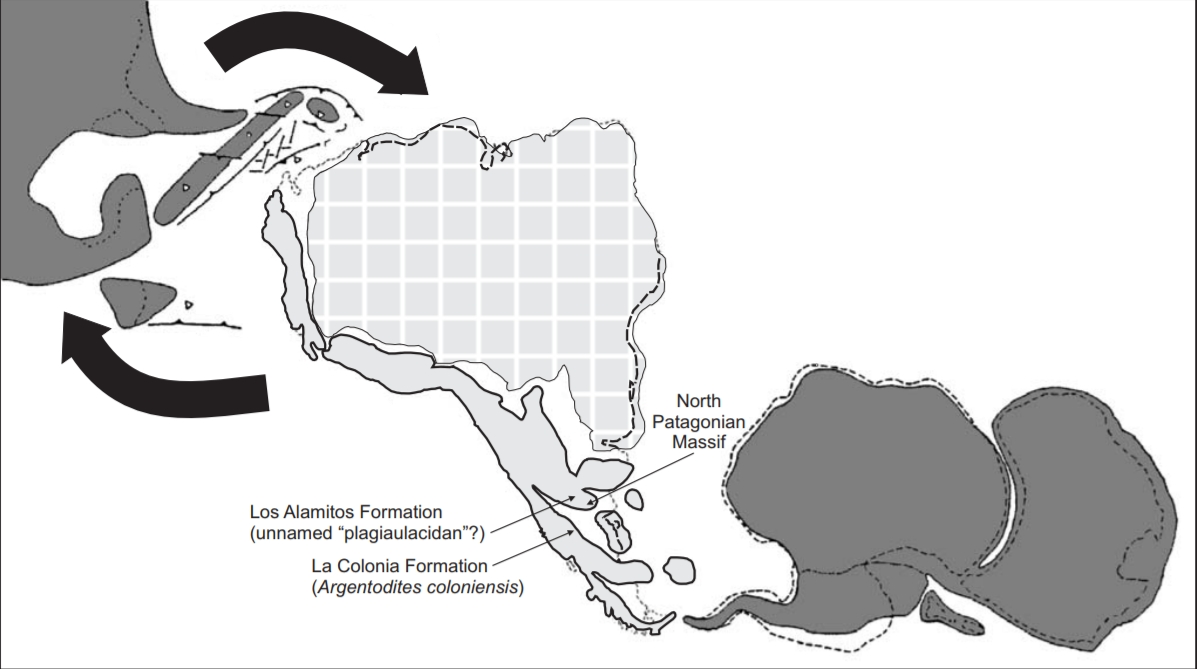
Sketch of the paleogeographic situation of South America during the Late Cretaceous and Early Paleogene, roughly 85 to 63 Ma. The Colorado Basin, located north of the North Patagonian Massif in the South Gondwanan Province (grey), is exposed and eroded during the Maastrichtian.

The basin started forming in the Middle to Late Jurassic with the break-up of Pangea and the formation of the Southern Atlantic. The main rifting took place in the Early Cretaceous. The pre-rift sequence of the basin comprises the Pennsylvanian Lolén Formation of the Ventana Group, and the Sauce Grande, Piedra Azul, Bonete and Tunas Formations of the Pillahuincó Group, dating to the Permian. During the late Paleozoic, the Colorado Basin was located in the south polar region, causing a sequence of glacial deposits in the basin. These deposits were mostly sourced from the African basin, the Karoo and Kalahari Basins. The Early Permian sediments are characterized by the presence of diamictites. A transgression in the Permian led to the deposition of the Piedra Azul Formation. The succession contains several hiatuses, dating to the Triassic and Early Jurassic, Albian and Paleogene.

The early Mesozoic succession is missing, and the main rifting phase happened in the Barremian and Aptian, around 120 million years ago, represented in the Fortín Formation. The post-rift sag stage dates to the early Late Cretaceous leading to the deposition of the alluvial and fluvial sediments of the Colorado Formation. The drift stage is represented by the Pedro Luro Formation. The later Cenozoic succession is characteristic of a terrestrial passive margin setting and comprises the Paleocene Elvira, Middle Miocene Barranca Final Formation, and the Middle to Late Miocene Gran Bajo de Gualicho Formation. This formation in most of the basin is overlain by the Río Negro Formation. The Late Miocene succession in the westernmost area of the basin is represented by the Arroyo Chasicó and eolian Cerro Azul Formations, cropping out in the northern onshore part of the basin. This sequence is covered by the Late Miocene to Early Pliocene eolian and fluvial Río Negro Formation, outcropping in a thin band along the eponymous river.

=== Stratigraphy ===
Age	Group	Formation	Environment	Tectonic regime	Maximum thickness	Petroleum geology	Notes
Quaternary	alluvium			Passive margin			
Early Pliocene		Río Negro	Eolian & fluvial	Passive margin	480 m (1,570 ft)		
Late Miocene		Río Negro	Eolian & fluvial	Passive margin	480 m (1,570 ft)		
Chasicoan-Huayquerian		Cerro Azul	Eolian	Passive margin	180 m (590 ft)		
Chasicoan		Arroyo Chasicó	Floodplain	Passive margin			
Mayoan		Gran Bajo de Gualicho	Shallow marine	Passive margin	57 m (187 ft)		
Laventan		Gran Bajo de Gualicho	Shallow marine	Passive margin	57 m (187 ft)		
Colloncuran		Gran Bajo de Gualicho	Shallow marine	Passive margin	57 m (187 ft)		
Friasian		Gran Bajo de Gualicho	Shallow marine	Passive margin	57 m (187 ft)		
Santacrucian		Gran Bajo de Gualicho	Shallow marine	Passive margin	57 m (187 ft)		
Mid Miocene		Barranca Final	Marine	Passive margin	300 m (980 ft)		
Oligocene	Hiatus			Passive margin			
Late Eocene	Hiatus			Passive margin			
Middle Eocene		Elvira					
Early Eocene	Hiatus						
Late Paleocene	Hiatus						
Early Paleocene		Pedro Luro		Drift		Seal	
Maastrichtian	Hiatus						
Campanian		Colorado	Alluvial & fluvial	Sag		Reservoir	
Santonian		Colorado	Alluvial & fluvial	Sag		Reservoir	
Coniacian		Colorado	Alluvial & fluvial	Sag		Reservoir	
Turonian		Colorado	Alluvial & fluvial	Sag		Reservoir	
Cenomanian		Colorado	Alluvial & fluvial	Sag		Reservoir	
Albian	Hiatus						
Aptian		Fortín		Syn-rift		Reservoir; Source	
Barremian		Fortín		Syn-rift		Reservoir; Source	
Middle Jurassic	Hiatus						
Early Jurassic	Hiatus						
Triassic	Hiatus						
Late Permian	Pillahuincó	Tunas		Pre-rift	1,500 m (4,900 ft)	Source	
Early Permian	Pillahuincó	Bonete		Pre-rift	1,500 m (4,900 ft)	Source	
Early Permian	Pillahuincó	Piedra Azul		Pre-rift	1,500 m (4,900 ft)		
Early Permian	Pillahuincó	Sauce Grande		Pre-rift	1,500 m (4,900 ft)		
Pennsylvanian	Ventana	Lolén	Basement				

== Paleontological significance ==
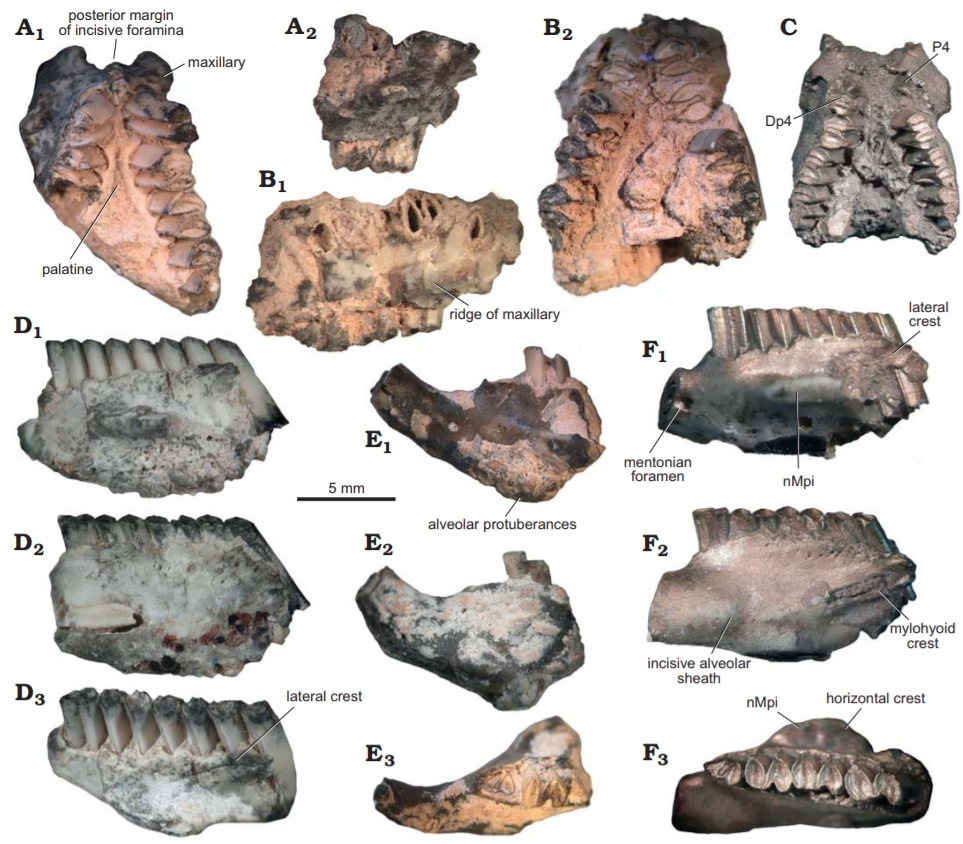
Neocavia pampeana of the Cerro Azul Formation

The Miocene formations cropping out onshore have provided a rich mammal fauna. The Arroyo Chasicó Formation is the defining formation for the Late Miocene Chasicoan South American land mammal age, ranging from 10 to 9 million years ago. The formation contains many mammal species, birds and reptiles. The Cerro Azul Formation contains fossils of the rodents Chasichimys bonaerense, Neocavia pampeana, Reigechimys plesiodon and R. simplex, the armadillos Chasicotatus ameghinoi, and Macrochorobates scalabrinii, and the opossum Zygolestes tatei, among other mammals. The Río Negro Formation has provided fossils of the glyptodont Plohophorus figuratus.

The marine Gran Bajo de Gualicho Formation contains many bivalve, gastropod and echinoid fossils, and the cetacean Preaulophyseter gualichensis. The Eocene succession in boreholes of the basin has provided many species of dinoflagellates, and in the Permian sequence 131 species of spores, algae, funghi and pollen were registered.

== Petroleum exploration ==
Contrary to other Southern Atlantic marginal basins, as the Golfo San Jorge and Austral Basins to the south, and Santos Basin of Brazil to the north, the Colorado Basin is not producing hydrocarbons. The first wells in the northern onshore part of the basin were drilled in 1946 (Pedro Luro-1) and 1948 (Ombucta-1) by YPF. Another phase of onshore exploration happened in the 1960s, with seven wells drilled by Shell. Offshore drilling started in 1970 by Hunt Oil and after seismic acquisition in the 1970s by YPF, some wells were drilled in 1977 by the same company. Renewed exploration started in the mid-1990s with several wells drilled by Union Texas and Shell. The offshore Cruz del Sur x-1 well provided oil shows of 39° API.

== See also ==
- Pelotas Basin
- Cañadón Asfalto Basin
- Golfo San Jorge Basin
- Austral Basin
