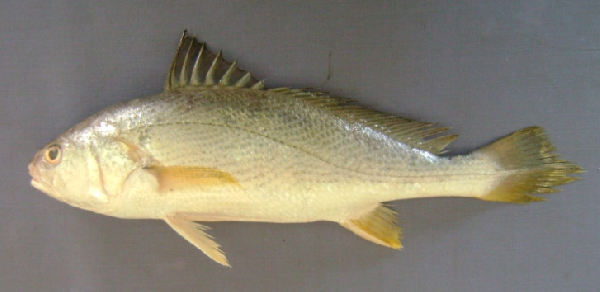

Conservation status
- Least Concern (IUCN 3.1)

Scientific classification
- Kingdom: Animalia
- Phylum: Chordata
- Class: Actinopterygii
- Order: Acanthuriformes
- Family: Sciaenidae
- Genus: Daysciaena; Talwar, 1971
- Species: D. albida

Binomial name
- Daysciaena albida (Cuvier, 1830)

Synonyms
- Corvina albida Cuvier, 1830; Nibea albida (Cuvier, 1830); Sciaena albida (Cuvier, 1830); Dendrophysa hooghliensis Sinha & Babu Rao, 1969

= Bengal corvina =

Species of ray-finned fish

The Bengal corvina (Daysciaena albida) is a species of marine ray-finned fish belonging to the family Sciaenidae, the drums and croakers. It is the only species in the monospecific genus Daysciaena. This species is found in the Indian Ocean.
