= Sculptured sea catfish =

Conservation status
- Least Concern (IUCN 3.1)

Scientific classification
- Kingdom: Animalia
- Phylum: Chordata
- Class: Actinopterygii
- Order: Siluriformes
- Family: Ariidae
- Genus: Notarius
- Species: N. kessleri

Binomial name
- Notarius kessleri (Steindachner, 1876)

Synonyms
- Arius elatturus Jordan & Gilbert, 1883; Arius kessleri Steindachner, 1876; Ariopsis kessleri (Steindachner, 1876); Galeichthys elatturus (Jordan & Gilbert, 1883); Galeichthys kessleri (Steindachner, 1876); Hexanematichthys kessleri (Steindachner, 1876); Netuma elattura (Jordan & Gilbert, 1883); Netuma kessleri (Steindachner, 1876); Netuma hassleriana Borodin, 1934; Netuma insularum Greene, 1897; Tachisurus elatturus (Jordan & Gilbert, 1883)

Species of fish

The sculptured sea catfish (Notarius kessleri) is a species of catfish in the family Ariidae. It was described by Franz Steindachner in 1876, originally under the genus Arius. It inhabits brackish and marine waters in Costa Rica, Mexico and Panama. It reaches a maximum total length of 45 cm (18 in), more commonly reaching a TL of 40 cm (16 in).

The sculptured sea catfish is currently ranked as Least Concern by the IUCN Redlist.
