= Bressou sea catfish =

Conservation status
- Least Concern (IUCN 3.1)

Scientific classification
- Kingdom: Animalia
- Phylum: Chordata
- Class: Actinopterygii
- Order: Siluriformes
- Family: Ariidae
- Genus: Notarius
- Species: N. quadriscutis

Binomial name
- Notarius quadriscutis (Valenciennes, 1840)

Synonyms
- Aspistor quadriscutis Valenciennes, 1840; Arius quadriscutis Valenciennes, 1840

Species of fish

The Bressou sea catfish (Notarius quadriscutis), also called the marine catfish, is a species of sea catfish in the family Ariidae. It was described by Achille Valenciennes in 1840, originally under the genus Arius. It inhabits tropical marine, brackish and freshwater on the Atlantic coast of South America, ranging from Guyana to Brazil. It reaches a maximum total length of 50 cm (20 in), but more commonly reaches a TL of 30 cm (12 in).

The diet of the Bressou sea catfish consists of benthic invertebrates. It is preyed on by the Gillbacker sea catfish (listed as Arius parkeri on FishBase) and the Crucifix sea catfish (listed as Hexanematichthys proops). It is of minor commercial interest to fisheries; it is sold fresh in markets within its region, and exported frozen.

The Bressou sea catfish spawns between the months of September–November. The eggs are incubated in the mouths of males.
