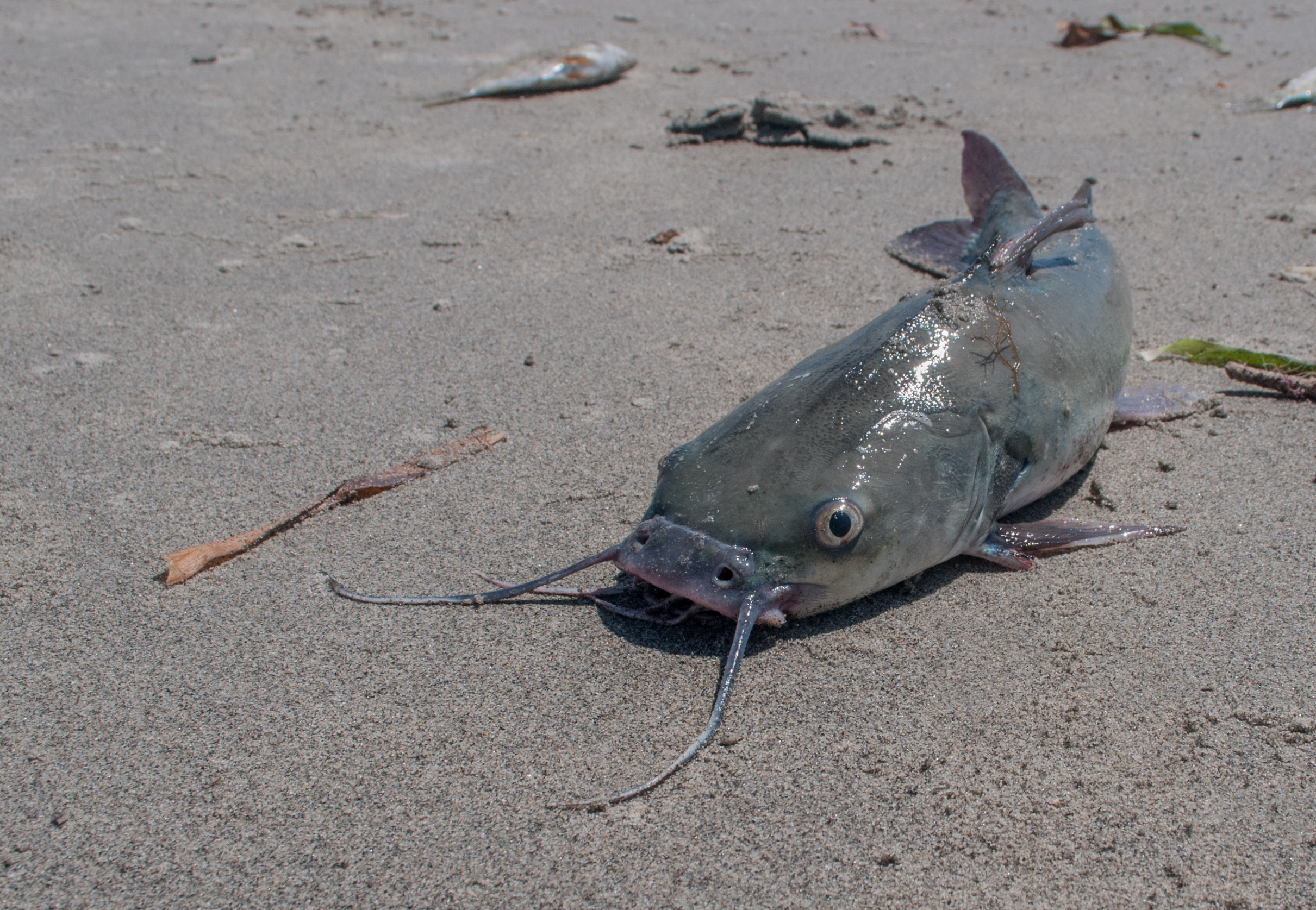
- Sciades herzbergii

Scientific classification
- Kingdom: Animalia
- Phylum: Chordata
- Class: Actinopterygii
- Order: Siluriformes
- Family: Ariidae
- Subfamily: Ariinae
- Genus: Sciades; J. P. Müller & Troschel, 1849

Type species
- Sciades emphysetus Müller & Troschel, 1849

= Sciades =

Genus of fishes

Sciades is a genus of sea catfishes mostly found along the Atlantic Ocean and Caribbean Sea coasts of Central and South America. One species, S. dowii, occurs on the Pacific side from Panama to Ecuador. The genus Ariopsis has been merged with Sciades by some authorities.

Currently, six described species are in this genus:

- Sciades couma (Valenciennes, 1840) (Couma sea-catfish)
- Sciades dowii (T. N. Gill, 1863) (brown sea-catfish)
- Sciades herzbergii (Bloch, 1794) (Pemecou sea catfish)
- Sciades parkeri (Traill, 1832) (gillbacker sea catfish)
- Sciades passany (Valenciennes, 1840) (Passany sea catfish)
- Sciades proops (Valenciennes, 1840) (crucifix sea catfish)
