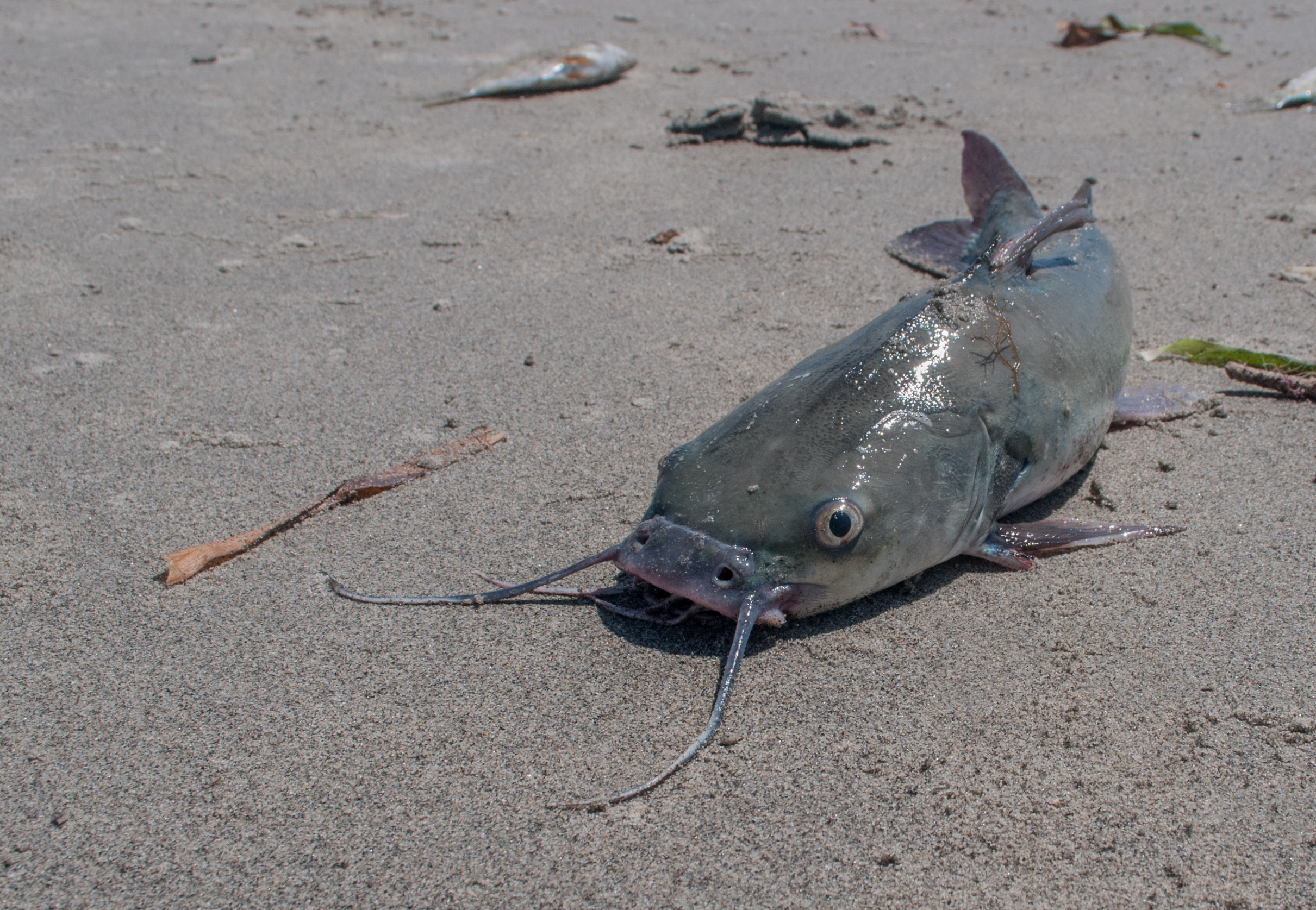

Conservation status
- Least Concern (IUCN 3.1)

Scientific classification
- Kingdom: Animalia
- Phylum: Chordata
- Class: Actinopterygii
- Division: Teleostei
- Order: Siluriformes
- Family: Ariidae
- Genus: Sciades
- Species: S. herzbergii

Binomial name
- Sciades herzbergii (Bloch, 1794)

Synonyms
- Arius herzbergii (Bloch, 1794); Arius hertzbergii (Bloch, 1794); Bagrus mesops Valenciennes, 1840; Bagrus pemecus Valenciennes, 1840; Bagrus coelestinus Müller & Troschel, 1849; Hexanematichthys herzbergii (Bloch, 1794); Hexanematichthys hymenorrhinos Bleeker, 1862; Netuma dubia Bleeker, 1862; Pimelodus argenteus Lacepède, 1803; Sciades hymenorrhinos (Bleeker, 1862); Sciades hymenorrhinus (Bleeker, 1862); Selenaspis herzbergii (Bloch, 1794); Selenapsis herzbergii (Bloch, 1794); Selenaspis herzbergi (Bloch, 1794); Silurus herzbergii Bloch, 1794

= Pemecou sea catfish =

Species of fish

The Pemecou sea catfish (Sciades herzbergii), also known as the flapnose sea catfish, the mud cuirass, or the gillbacker, is a species of catfish in the family Ariidae. It was described by Marcus Elieser Bloch in 1794, originally under the genus Silurus. It inhabits marine, brackish and freshwaters in Brazil, Guyana, French Guiana, Colombia, Suriname, Venezuela, and Trinidad and Tobago. It dwells at a depth range of 1 to 5 m (3.3 to 16.4 ft). It reaches a maximum total length of 94.2 cm (37.1 in), while males more commonly reach a TL of 30 cm (12 in) and females reach a TL of 62.5 cm (24.6 in). It reaches a maximum weight of 1.5 kg (3.3 lb).

The diet of the pemecou sea catfish consists of annelid worms and benthic crustaceans. Spawning has been observed to take place at various times throughout the year, depending on the region. The species is currently ranked as Least Concern by the IUCN redlist, although it notes that its frequency in mangrove channels could potentially place it at risk of habitat loss. It also notes that the species has become of greater interest for artisanal fishing in northern Brazil. The pemecou sea catfish is also of minor interest to commercial fisheries.

== Etymology ==
Although the patronym was not identified, it is most probably in honor of Count Ewald Friedrich von Herzberg (also spelled Hertzberg, 1725–1795), a Prussian who was one of Bloch's sponsors.
