= Couma sea catfish =

Scientific classification
- Domain: Eukaryota
- Kingdom: Animalia
- Phylum: Chordata
- Class: Actinopterygii
- Order: Siluriformes
- Family: Ariidae
- Genus: Sciades
- Species: S. couma

Binomial name
- Sciades couma (Valenciennes, 1840)

Synonyms
- Arius couma (Valenciennes, 1840); Bagrus couma Valenciennes, 1840; Hexanematichthys couma (Valenciennes, 1840); Selenaspis couma (Valenciennes, 1840); Sciadeichthys walcrechtii Boeseman, 1954; Sciadeichthys walrechti Boeseman, 1954; Sciadeichthys walrechtii Boeseman, 1954

Species of fish

The Couma sea catfish (Sciades couma), also known as the Pemecou sea catfish, is a species of catfish in the family Ariidae. It was described by Achille Valenciennes in 1840, originally under the genus Bagrus. It inhabits estuaries and rivers in Guyana, French Guiana, Suriname, Brazil, Trinidad and Tobago, and Venezuela. It reaches a maximum total length of 97 cm (38 in), more commonly reaching a TL of 50 cm (20 in). It reaches a maximum weight of 30 kg (66 lb). Its maximum known life expectancy is 5 years.

The couma sea catfish has an extensive diet, consisting predominantly of crabs including Aratus pisonii, Pachygrapsus gracilis, Uca rapax, Uca maracoani, and Ucides cordatus, as well as other crustaceans such as shrimp in the genera Alpheus and Macrobrachium. It also feeds on bony fish in the family Ophichthidae and the genus Hypostomus, as well as ariid larvae, gastropods, insects, and debris such as skin from mammals, and leaves and twigs from terrestrial plants.

The couma sea catfish is of high value to commercial fisheries, with the delicate texture of its flesh being its main source of appeal. Its meat is marketed both fresh and salted. It is currently ranked as Least Concern by the IUCN redlist, with the ranking based on the species' apparent ability to cope with commercial fishing practices. It also notes that the population could possibly be threatened by pollution in its habitat, though at present the effects this may be having on the species are unknown.
