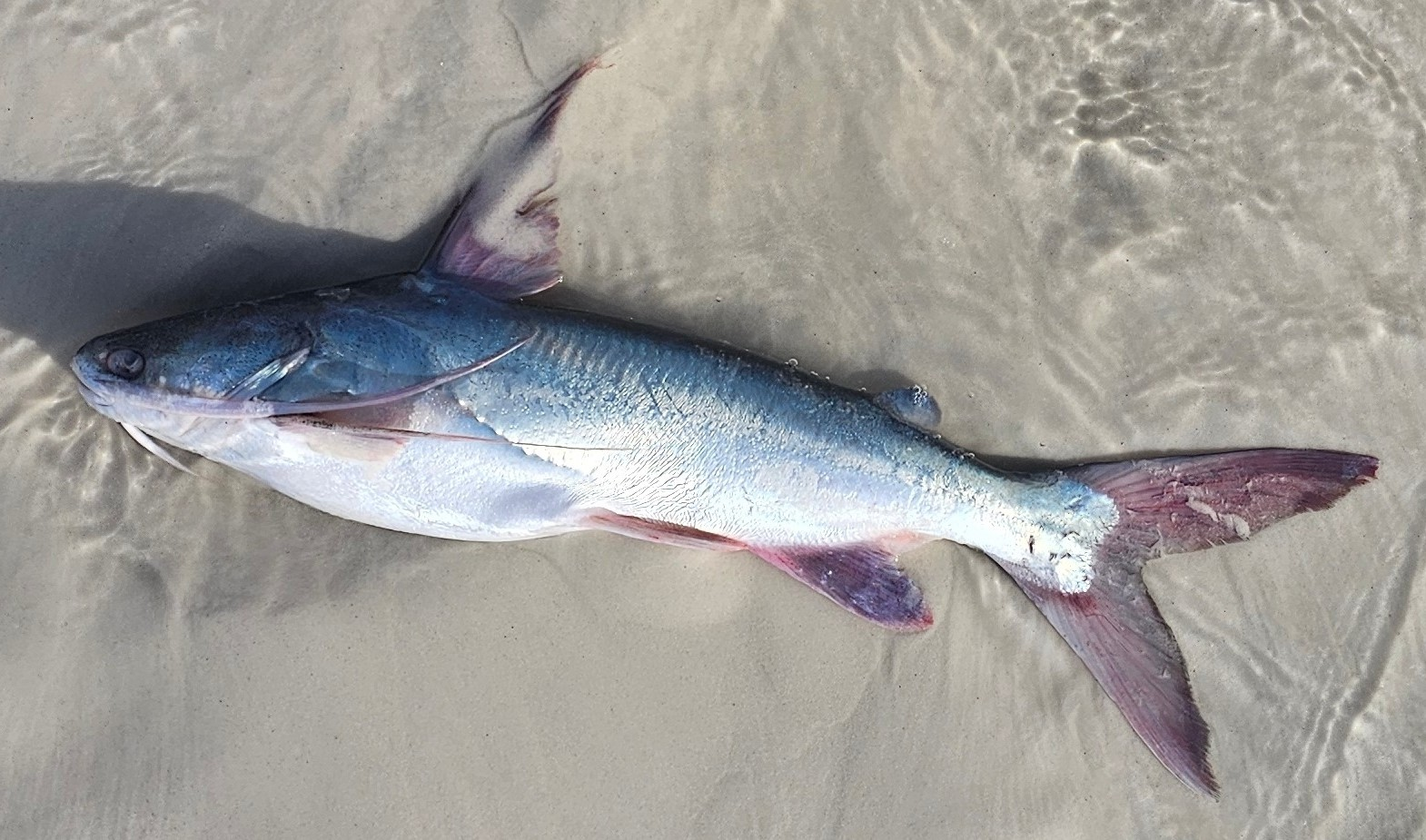
- Beached gafftopsail catfish, Florida

Conservation status
- Least Concern (IUCN 3.1)

Scientific classification
- Kingdom: Animalia
- Phylum: Chordata
- Class: Actinopterygii
- Division: Teleostei
- Order: Siluriformes
- Family: Ariidae
- Genus: Bagre
- Species: B. marinus

Binomial name
- Bagre marinus (Mitchill, 1815)

Synonyms
- Silurus marinus Mitchill, 1815; Felichthys marinus (Mitchill, 1815); Galeichthys blochii Valenciennes, 1840; Galeichthys parrae Valenciennes, 1840; Galeichthys bahiensis Castelnau, 1855; Aelurichthys longispinis Günther, 1864

= Gafftopsail catfish =

Species of fish

The gafftopsail catfish (Bagre marinus) is a species of marine catfish found in the waters of the western central Atlantic Ocean, as well as the Gulf of Mexico and the Caribbean Sea. It has long, venomous spines which can cause painful wounds. It feeds on crustaceans and other fish. The male of the species fertilizes the eggs of the female, and broods them in his mouth until they hatch. The gafftopsail feeds throughout the water column. This fish is a common catch in the Southeastern US, although it may be found as far north as New York. They are considered strong fighters by anglers. They are taken from piers, jetties, reefs, and the surf, as well as bottom fishing or flats fishing. They are caught with hard lures as well as soft plastics, cut bait, and live or dead shrimp. Some fishermen use traps for catfish, a method regulated by some states.

== Distribution ==
Gafftopsail catfish live on the Atlantic, Caribbean and Gulf of Mexico coastlines from Cape Cod to Brazil. They are also found in brackish waters, including estuaries, lagoons, brackish seas, and mangroves. Gafftopsails are generally common to abundant in their range.

== Description ==
The gafftopsail catfish is blue-grey to dark brown with a light grey belly. Its appearance is typical for a catfish except for the deeply forked tail and the venomous, serrated spines. It also has a little hump that looks somewhat like a wave. The anal fin is a few inches anterior to the tail and is white or pale blue, with 22–28 rays on it and a high, anterior lobe. The pelvic fin is 6–12 in (15–30 cm) anterior to the tail fin. The gafftopsail catfish has maxillary barbels and one pair of barbels on the chin. It resembles the hardhead catfish, but its dorsal spine has a distinctive fleshy extension (like the fore-and-aft topsail of a ship).

=== Weight and length ===
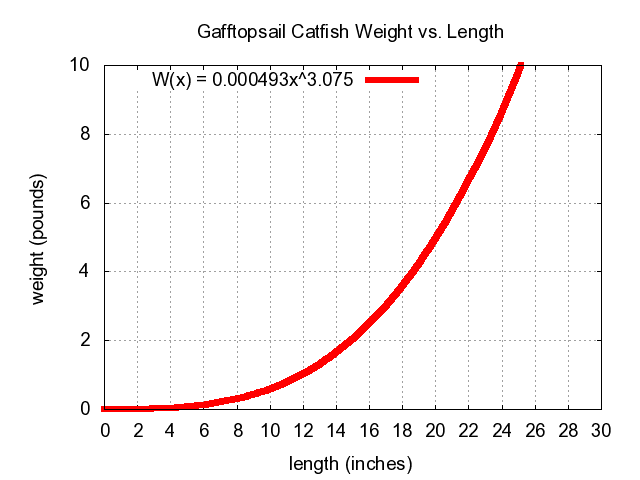
Growth chart

The typical length of a mature gafftopsail catfish is about 17 in (43 cm). The largest recorded weight for a gafftopsail catfish is 4.54 kg (10 lb 0 oz) and 69 cm (27 in) in length. A more common weight and length of gafftopsails caught is 1–2 lb (0.45–0.91 kg) and 12–16 in (30–41 cm).

As gafftopsail catfish grow longer, they increase in weight, but the relationship is not linear. The relationship between total length (L, in inches) and total weight (W, in pounds) for nearly all species of fish can be expressed by an equation of the form:

$W = cL^b\!\,$

Invariably, b is close to 3.0 for all species, and the constant c varies between species. Data from the Florida Fish and Wildlife Conservation Commission indicate, for the gafftopsail catfish, c = 0.000493 and b = 3.075 The relationship described in this section suggests a 12-inch gafftopsail catfish will weigh about one pound, while a 20-inch fish will likely weigh about five pounds.

== Biology ==
The primary food of juveniles is unidentifiable organic matter; the secondary food is fish, with smaller amounts from other trophic groups. Unlike many other catfish, which are primarily bottom feeders, the gafftopsail catfish feeds throughout the water column. It eats mostly crustaceans, including crabs, shrimp, and prawns (95% of the diet), but it will also eat worms, other invertebrates, and bony fishes (about 5% of the diet). In addition to humans, predators of the gafftopsail catfish include the tiger shark and bull shark.

Gafftopsail catfish spawn over inshore mudflats during a relatively short time span (10 days) from May to August;. The eggs are about 1 in (2.5 cm) in diameter. Being mouthbrooders, males keep up to 55 eggs in their mouths until they hatch. Young are about 5 cm (2 in) long when they hatch, and the male may continue to brood them until they are up to 4 in (10 cm) long. The males do not feed while they are carrying the eggs or young.

== Fishing ==
The gafftopsail catfish is a common catch in the Southeastern United States, although it is also caught as far north as New York. They are taken from piers, jetties, reefs, and the surf, as well as bottom fishing or flats fishing. They are caught with cut bait and shrimp, or lures such as plugs, spoons and spinners, as well as soft plastic lures resembling shrimp, worms, and shad. They are attracted to the sound of struggling fish, like a popping cork creates. Catfish trapping is also used to capture them, but is regulated in some states. Catfish traps include "slat traps", long wooden traps with an angled entrance, and wire hoop traps. Typical bait for these traps includes rotten cheese and dog food.

Gafftopsail catfish are good eating; the red lateral line should be removed to prevent a "muddy" taste; however in gafftopsails taken from southern Florida mangrove estuaries, this is seemingly unnecessary. The pectoral fins and dorsal fin contain venomous spines; care should be used when handling this fish.
