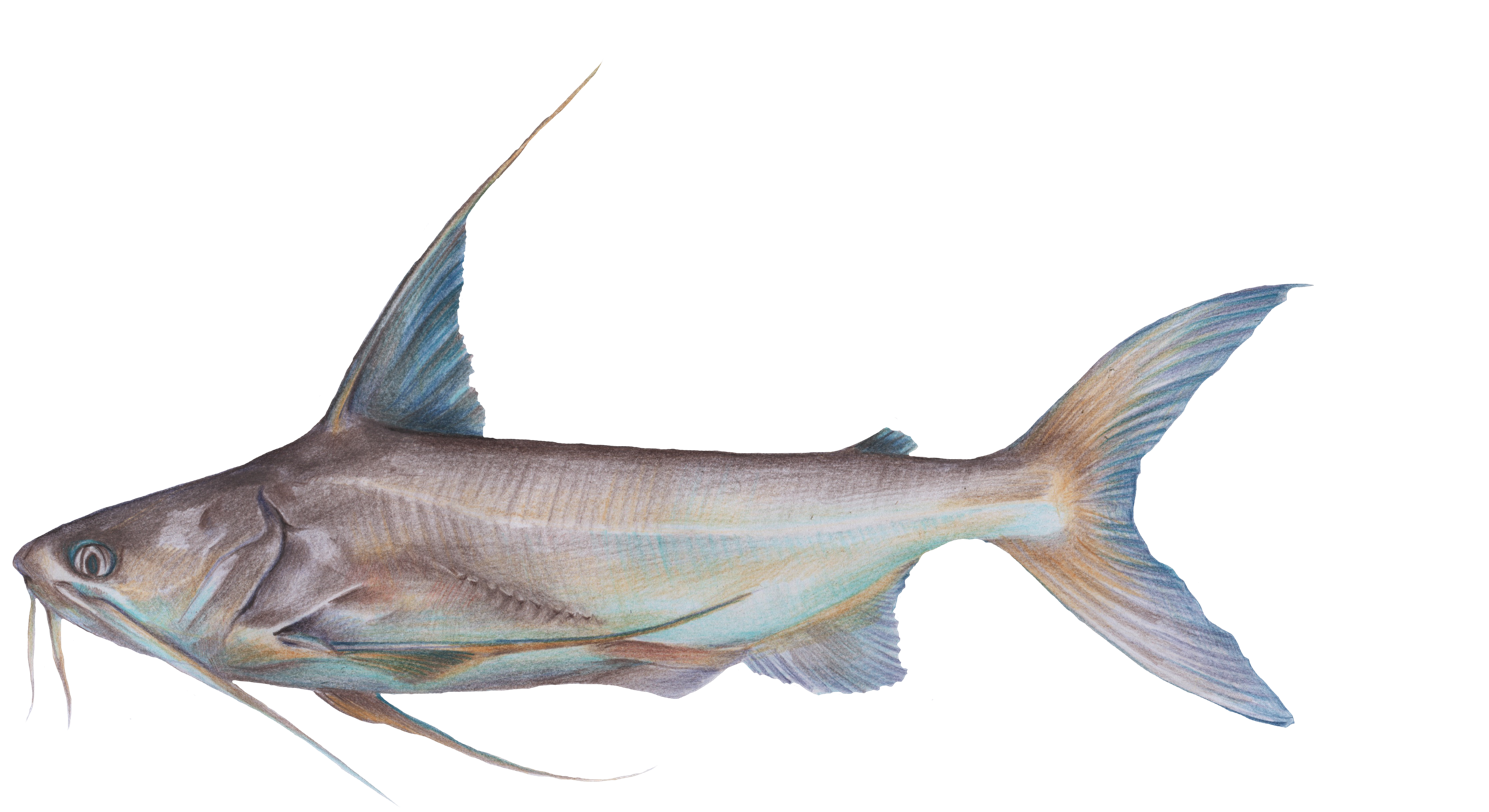

Conservation status
- Least Concern (IUCN 3.1)

Scientific classification
- Kingdom: Animalia
- Phylum: Chordata
- Class: Actinopterygii
- Order: Siluriformes
- Family: Ariidae
- Genus: Bagre
- Species: B. bagre

Binomial name
- Bagre bagre Linnaeus, 1766

Synonyms
- Silurus bagre Linnaeus, 1766; Felichthys bagre (Linnaeus, 1766); Pimelodus coruscans Lichtenstein, 1819; Paradiplomystes coruscans (Lichtenstein, 1819); Bagrus macronemus Ranzani, 1841; Mystus carolinensis Gronow, 1854

= Coco sea catfish =

Species of fish

The coco sea catfish (Bagre bagre) is a species of sea catfish in the family Ariidae. It was described by Carl Linnaeus in 1776, originally under the genus Silurus. It inhabits tropical marine and brackish waters ranging between Colombia and the Amazon River, in South America. It dwells at a maximum depth of 50 m (160 ft). It reaches a maximum total length of 55 cm (22 in), more commonly reaching 40 cm (16 in).

The diet of the coco sea catfish includes bony fish and benthic crustaceans. It is preyed on by the smalltail shark. It is of commercial interest to fisheries, and is marketed fresh.
