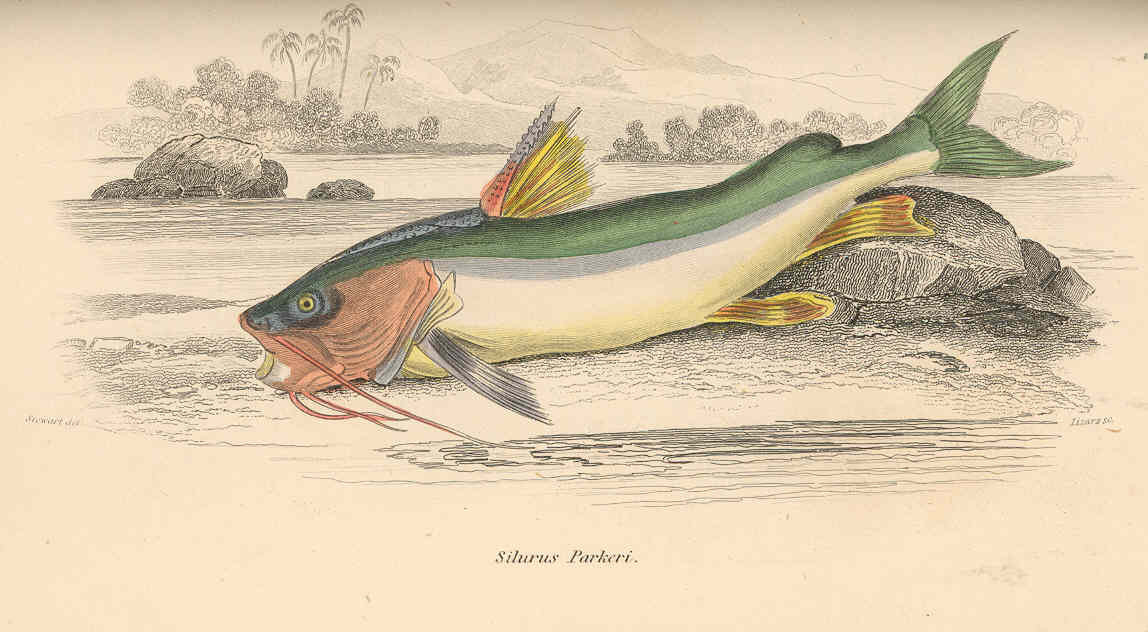

Conservation status
- Vulnerable (IUCN 3.1)

Scientific classification
- Kingdom: Animalia
- Phylum: Chordata
- Class: Actinopterygii
- Order: Siluriformes
- Family: Ariidae
- Genus: Sciades
- Species: S. parkeri

Binomial name
- Sciades parkeri (Traill, 1832)

Synonyms
- Sciades emphysetus (Müller & Troschel, 1849)

= Sciades parkeri =

Species of fish

Sciades parkeri, the gillbacker sea catfish, is a species of sea catfish found in coastal rivers in Brazil, French Guiana, Guyana, Suriname, and Venezuela. While usually no more than 90 cm in length, it can reach lengths of up to 190 cm and weigh up to 50 kg.

== Etymology ==
The fish is named in honor of Traill's friend Charles Stewart Parker (1800-1868), a British merchant who supplied the author with a drawing of the catfish and its skin.
