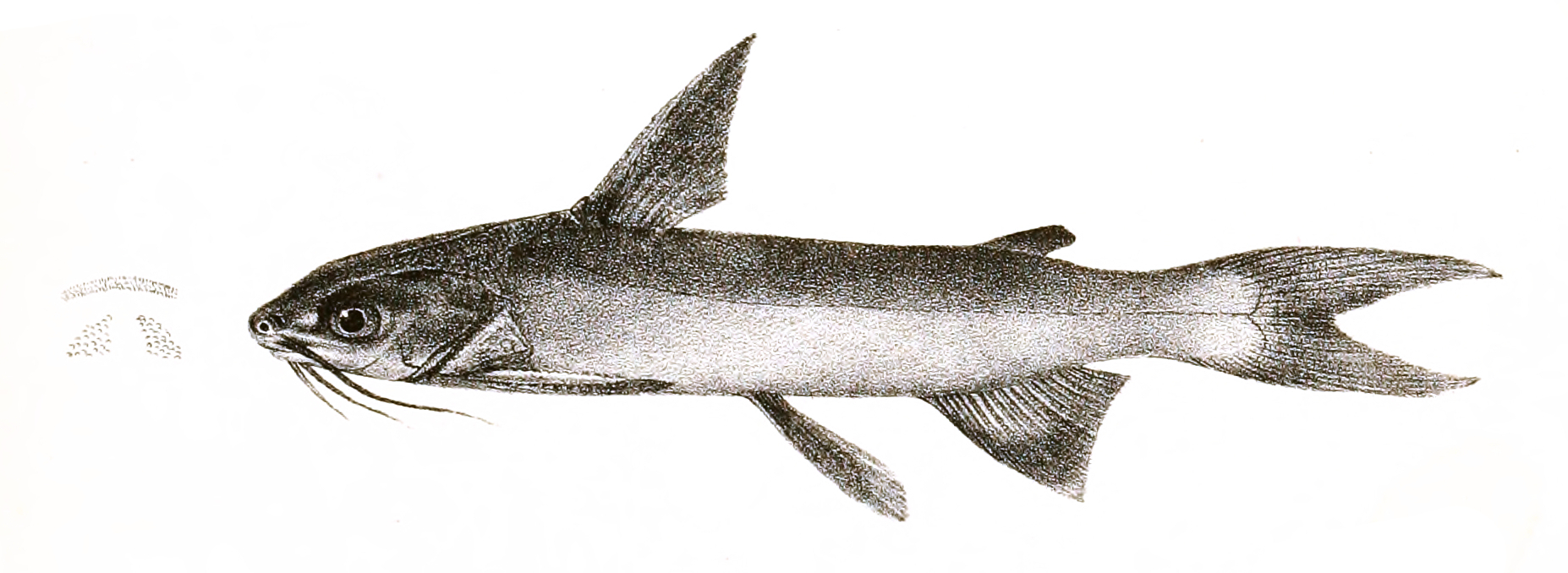
- Arius arius

Scientific classification
- Kingdom: Animalia
- Phylum: Chordata
- Class: Actinopterygii
- Order: Siluriformes
- Family: Ariidae
- Subfamily: Ariinae
- Genus: Arius; Valenciennes in G. Cuvier & Valenciennes, 1840

Type species
- Pimelodus arius Hamilton, 1822

Species
- See text

Synonyms
- ?Ariodes Müller & Troschel, 1849; Pseudarius Bleeker, 1862

= Arius (fish) =

Arius Temporal range: Campanian–Present

Genus of fishes

Arius is a genus of catfishes (order Siluriformes) of the family Ariidae. The genus Arius is distributed in brackish and fresh waters of Eastern Africa and east to Southeast Asia.

Defining the limits so that Arius can form a natural grouping has always been a problem. The genus was never properly defined, and many species previously classified in Arius are now in other genera. Recent authors have recognized this genus as polyphyletic, rejecting that the genus is a natural grouping. Two unnamed groups are distinguished by accessory tooth plates, which are either very elongated and bearing molar-like teeth, or are oval shaped or subtriangular and bearing acicular (needle-like) or conic teeth. A. jatius lacks these tooth plates, but has been included in this genus based on its adipose fin and lateral line. The recognition of Ariodes as a junior synonym of Arius is tentative and needs to be further investigated.

Arius species have three pairs of barbels, including the fleshy and cylindrical maxillary barbels and two pairs of mental barbels. The base of the adipose fin is moderately long, about half the length of the base of the anal fin.

== Species ==
Currently, 18 living species are recognized for this genus.

- Arius acutirostris F. Day, 1877
- Arius africanus Günther, 1867 (African sea catfish)
- Arius arenarius (J. P. Müller & Troschel, 1849) (sand catfish)
- Arius arius (F. Hamilton, 1822) (threadfin sea catfish)
- Arius brunellii Zolezzi, 1939
- Arius burmanicus F. Day, 1870
- Arius dispar Herre, 1926 (fleshysnout catfish)
- Arius gagora (F. Hamilton, 1822) (Gagora catfish)
- Arius jatius (F. Hamilton, 1822) (River catfish)
- Arius jella F. Day, 1877 (blackfin sea catfish)
- Arius macronotacanthus Bleeker, 1846
- Arius macracanthus Günther, 1864
- Arius maculatus (Thunberg, 1792) (spotted catfish)
- Arius malabaricus F. Day, 1877
- Arius manillensis Valenciennes, 1840 (Manila sea catfish)
- Arius microcephalus Bleeker, 1855 (squirrelheaded catfish)
- Arius subrostratus Valenciennes, 1840 (shovelnose sea catfish)
- Arius utik Bleeker, 1846
- Arius venosus Valenciennes, 1840 (veined catfish)

only listed by Fishbase

- Arius cous Hyrtl, 1859

In addition, a fairly extensive fossil record exists, encompassing several species, but mainly represented by otoliths.

- †Arius fraasi Peyer, 1928 - Eocene of Egypt (Mokattam Formation)
- †Arius kutchensis Rao, 1956 - Eocene of Gujarat, India
