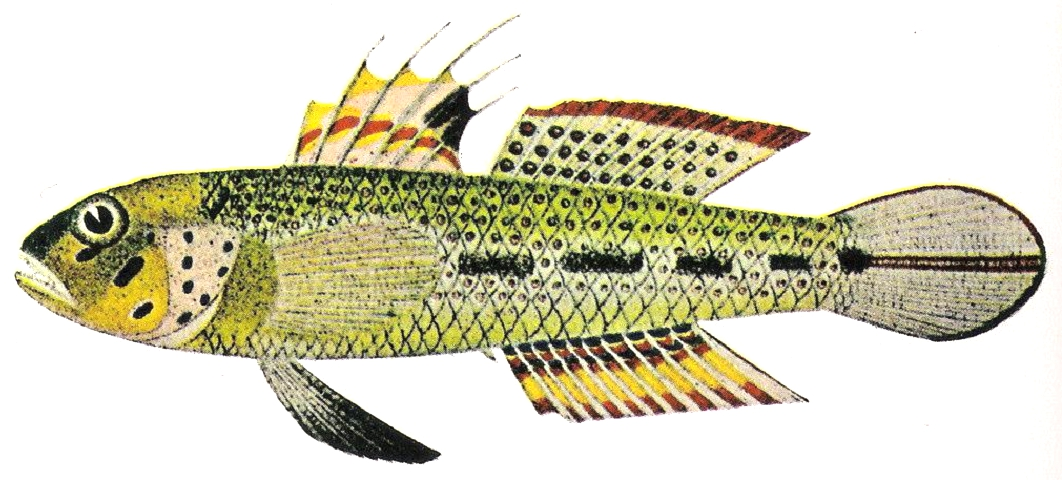
- Spinecheek goby (O. oplopomus)

Scientific classification
- Kingdom: Animalia
- Phylum: Chordata
- Class: Actinopterygii
- Order: Gobiiformes
- Family: Gobiidae
- Genus: Oplopomus; Valenciennes, 1837

Type species
- Gobius oplopomus Valenciennes, 1837

Synonyms
- Centrogobius Bleeker, 1874

= Oplopomus =

Genus of fishes

Oplopomus is a genus of gobies found in coral reefs of the Indo-Pacific region. It contains two species.

== Description ==
Oplopomus is characterized by elongated bodies and compressed heads. They possess 24 to 30 ctenoid scales on the body, becoming cycloid on the nape before disappearing just behind the eyes. Their snouts are short and round, smaller than the diameter of the eyes. The lower jaw protrudes past the upper jaw, with a pair of canine teeth on each side. The dorsal fins are separated with six rays on the first. The ventral fins are joined by a bridge of skin (a frenum). The caudal fins are round. They can grow to a maximum length of 10 cm (3.9 in).

They superficially resemble members of the genus Acentrogobius, but Oplopomus can be distinguished by having the first rays of both dorsal fins ending in a sharp point (pungent).

== Taxonomy ==
The genus Oplomopus was first used by the German zoologist Christian Gottfried Ehrenberg for Oplopomus pulcher (a synonym of Oplopomus oplopomus, first described by the French zoologist Achille Valenciennes in 1837). It was made available through subsequent usage by the Austrian zoologist Franz Steindachner in 1860. It has been classified under the subfamily Gobiinae of the goby family, Gobiidae, although the 5th edition of Fishes of the World does not recognise any subfamilies in Gobiidae.

== Species and distribution ==
Oplopomus can be found from the Red Sea to the Pacific Ocean. They inhabit coral reefs, in depths of 1 to 30 m (3.3 to 98.4 ft) beneath the surface. There are currently two recognized species in this genus:

- Oplopomus caninoides (Bleeker, 1852)
- Oplopomus oplopomus (Valenciennes, 1837) (Spinecheek goby)
