= Hemiarius =

- Hemiarius stormii

Scientific classification
- Kingdom: Animalia
- Phylum: Chordata
- Class: Actinopterygii
- Order: Siluriformes
- Family: Ariidae
- Subfamily: Ariinae
- Genus: Hemiarius; Bleeker, 1862

Type species
- Cephalocassis stormii Bleeker, 1858

Genus of fishes

Hemiarius is a genus of sea catfishes found in the coastal waters, estuaries, and rivers from South Asia through New Guinea and Australia to Oceania. Six described species are in this genus:

- Hemiarius bleekeri (Popta, 1900) (Bleeker's catfish)
- Hemiarius hardenbergi (Kailola, 2000)
- Hemiarius harmandi Sauvage, 1880
- Hemiarius stormii (Bleeker, 1858) (armoured sea-catfish)
- Hemiarius sumatranus (Anonymous, referred to E. T. Bennett, 1830) (goat catfish)
- Hemiarius verrucosus (H. H. Ng, 2003) (shovelnose sea catfish)
