= Armoured sea catfish =

Scientific classification
- Kingdom: Animalia
- Phylum: Chordata
- Class: Actinopterygii
- Order: Siluriformes
- Family: Ariidae
- Genus: Hemiarius
- Species: H. stormii

Binomial name
- Hemiarius stormii (Bleeker, 1858)

Synonyms
- Arius stormii (Bleeker, 1858); Arius stormi (Bleeker, 1858); Cephalocassis stormii Bleeker, 1858; Cephalocassis stormi Bleeker, 1858; Tachysurus stormii (Bleeker, 1858)

Species of fish

The armoured sea catfish (Hemiarius stormii) is a species of catfish in the family Ariidae. It was described by Pieter Bleeker in 1858, originally under the genus Cephalocassis. It is known from freshwater rivers in Thailand and Indonesia. It reaches a maximum total length of 50 cm (20 in). Its diet consists of finfish and benthic invertebrates.
