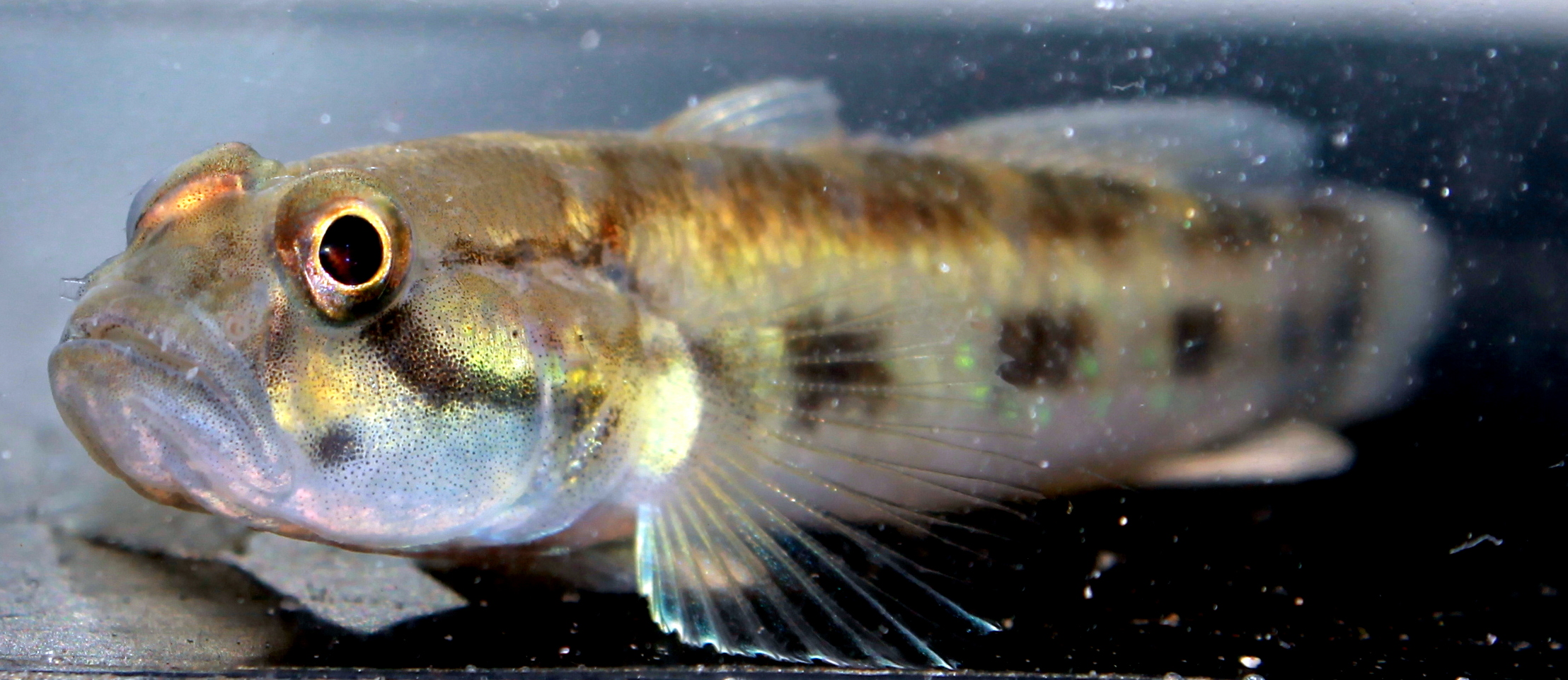

Conservation status
- Least Concern (IUCN 3.1)

Scientific classification
- Kingdom: Animalia
- Phylum: Chordata
- Class: Actinopterygii
- Order: Gobiiformes
- Family: Gobiidae
- Genus: Acentrogobius
- Species: A. viridipunctatus

Binomial name
- Acentrogobius viridipunctatus (Valenciennes, 1837)

Synonyms
- Gobius viridipunctatus Valenciennes, 1837; Ctenogobius viridipunctatus (Valenciennes, 1837); Acentrogobius sealei (H.M. Smith, 1931); Gobius chlorostigma Bleeker, 1849; Creisson sealei H.M. Smith, 1931

= Acentrogobius viridipunctatus =

Species of goby

Acentrogobius viridipunctatus, or the spotted green goby, is a species of goby found in brackish and salt water in the lower Chao Phraya River. It is the type species of the genus Acentrogobius.
