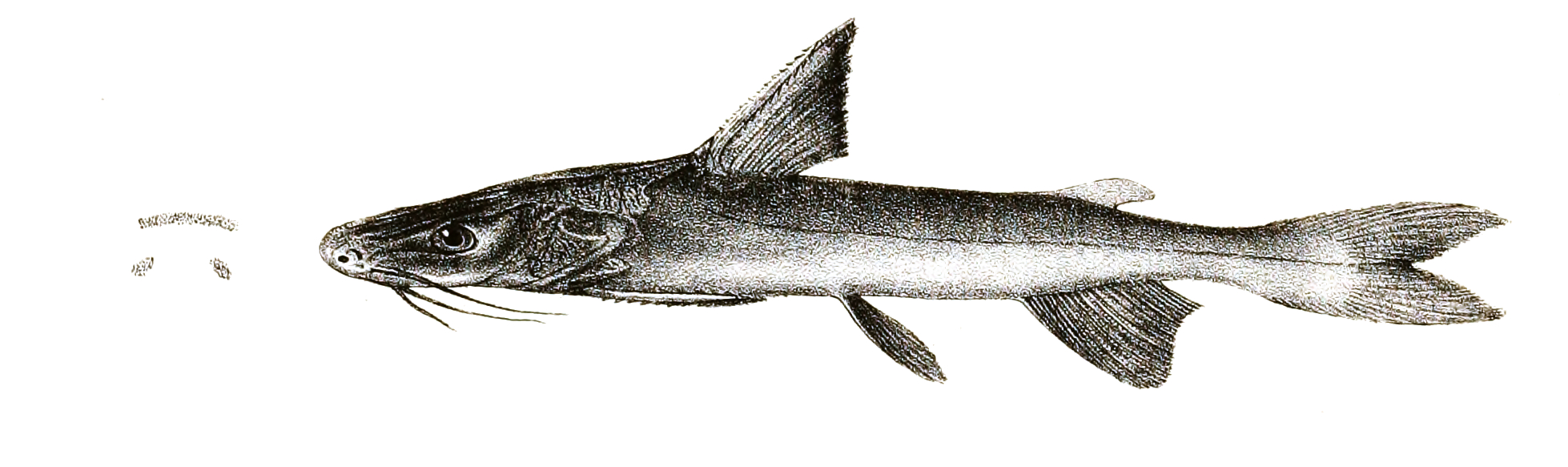

Conservation status
- Least Concern (IUCN 3.1)

Scientific classification
- Kingdom: Animalia
- Phylum: Chordata
- Class: Actinopterygii
- Order: Siluriformes
- Family: Ariidae
- Genus: Cochlefelis
- Species: C. burmanicus

Binomial name
- Cochlefelis burmanicus (F. Day, 1870)

Synonyms
- Arius burmanicus Day, 1870; Tachysurus burmanicus (Day, 1870); Cochlefelis burmanica (Day, 1870)

= Cochlefelis burmanicus =

Species of fish

Cochlefelis burmanicus is a species of catfish in the family Ariidae. It was described by Francis Day in 1870, originally under the genus Arius. It is known from brackish and freshwaters in Myanmar and Thailand. It reaches a length of 40 cm (16 in).

Cochlefelis burmanicus has been rated as Least Concern by the IUCN redlist.
