= Arius oetik =

Scientific classification
- Domain: Eukaryota
- Kingdom: Animalia
- Phylum: Chordata
- Class: Actinopterygii
- Order: Siluriformes
- Family: Ariidae
- Genus: Arius
- Species: A. oetik

Binomial name
- Arius oetik Bleeker, 1846

Synonyms
- Arius utik Bleeker, 1846

Species of fish

Arius oetik is a species of sea catfish in the family Ariidae. It was described by Pieter Bleeker in 1846. It is known from tropical marine and brackish waters in the western Pacific. It reaches a maximum total length of 22.5 cm (8.9 in). Its diet consists of mussels, flathead locust lobsters, shrimp, conger eels, ponyfish, squids and Indian mackerels.
