= Arius malabaricus =

Scientific classification
- Kingdom: Animalia
- Phylum: Chordata
- Class: Actinopterygii
- Order: Siluriformes
- Family: Ariidae
- Genus: Arius
- Species: A. malabaricus

Binomial name
- Arius malabaricus F. Day, 1877

Species of fish

Arius malabaricus is a species of sea catfish in the family Ariidae. It was described by Francis Day in 1877. It inhabits the marine and brackish waters of India, in the Indian Ocean.
