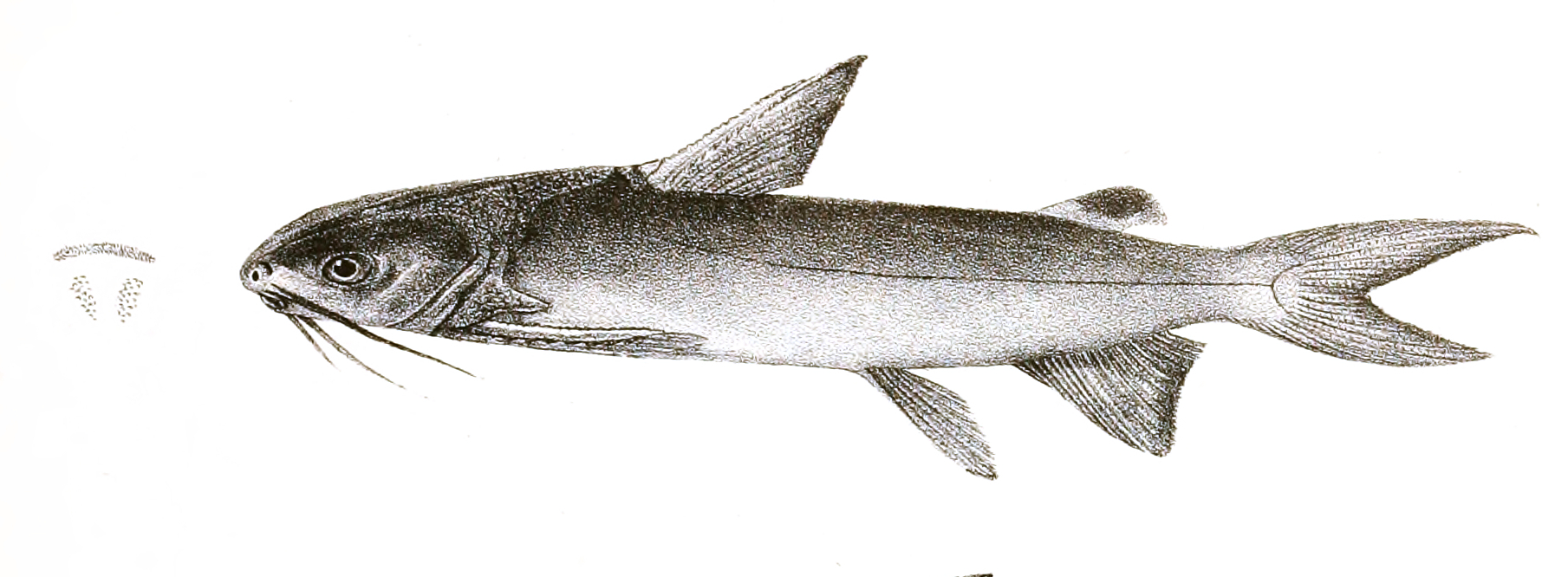

Scientific classification
- Domain: Eukaryota
- Kingdom: Animalia
- Phylum: Chordata
- Class: Actinopterygii
- Order: Siluriformes
- Family: Ariidae
- Genus: Arius
- Species: A. jella

Binomial name
- Arius jella Day, 1877

Synonyms
- Tachysurus jella (Day, 1877)

= Arius jella =

Species of fish

Arius jella, the blackfin sea catfish, is a species of ocean catfish in the Siluriformes order.

It is native to the Indian Ocean, including in the seas off India.
