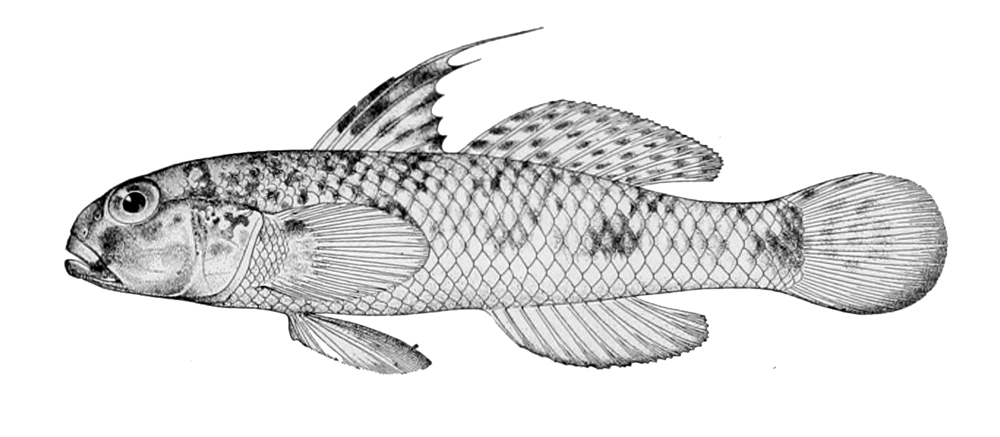
- Acentrogobius nebulosus

Scientific classification
- Kingdom: Animalia
- Phylum: Chordata
- Class: Actinopterygii
- Order: Gobiiformes
- Family: Gobiidae
- Genus: Acentrogobius; Bleeker, 1874

Type species
- Gobius chlorostigma Bleeker, 1849

Synonyms
- Amoya Herre, 1927; Creisson Jordan & Seale, 1907; Mindorogobius Herre, 1945

= Acentrogobius =

Genus of fishes

Acentrogobius is a genus of gobies native to marine, fresh and brackish waters of the coasts of the Indian Ocean and the western Pacific Ocean.

Acentrogobius matsya is an otolith-based fossil species found in the Burdigalian (Miocene) Quilon Formation of southwestern India.

== Species ==
There are currently 24 recognized species in this genus:

- Acentrogobius brevirostris (Günther, 1861)
- Acentrogobius caninus (Valenciennes, 1837) (Tropical sand goby)
- Acentrogobius cenderawasih Allen & Erdmann, 2012 (Cenderawasih goby)
- Acentrogobius chusanensis (Herre, 1940)
- Acentrogobius dayi Koumans, 1941 (Day's goby)
- Acentrogobius decaryi (Pellegrin, 1932)
- Acentrogobius gracilis (Bleeker, 1875) (Bluespotted mangrovegoby)
- Acentrogobius griseus (Day, 1876) (Grey goby)
- Acentrogobius horai (Fowler, 1925)
- Acentrogobius janthinopterus (Bleeker, 1853) (Robust mangrove goby)
- Acentrogobius limarius Allen, Erdmann & Hadiaty, 2015 (Batanta mud goby)
- Acentrogobius madraspatensis (F. Day, 1868) (Manyband goby)
- †Acentrogobius matsya Carolin, Bajpai, Maurya & Schwarzhans, 2022 (otolith-based fossil species)
- Acentrogobius moloanus (Herre, 1927) (Barcheek amoya)
- Acentrogobius multifasciatus (Herre, 1927)
- Acentrogobius pellidebilis Lee & Kim, 1992
- Acentrogobius pflaumii (Bleeker, 1853) (Striped sandgoby)
- Acentrogobius quinquemaculatus Allen, 2017
- Acentrogobius simplex (Sauvage, 1880) (Bagamoyo goby)
- Acentrogobius therezieni Kiener, 1963
- Acentrogobius vanderloosi Allen, 2015 (Mudslope goby)
- Acentrogobius veliensis (Geevarghese & John, 1982)
- Acentrogobius violarisi Allen, 2015 (Alotau goby)
- Acentrogobius virgatulus (Jordan & Snyder, 1901)
- Acentrogobius viridipunctatus (Valenciennes, 1837) (Spotted green goby)
