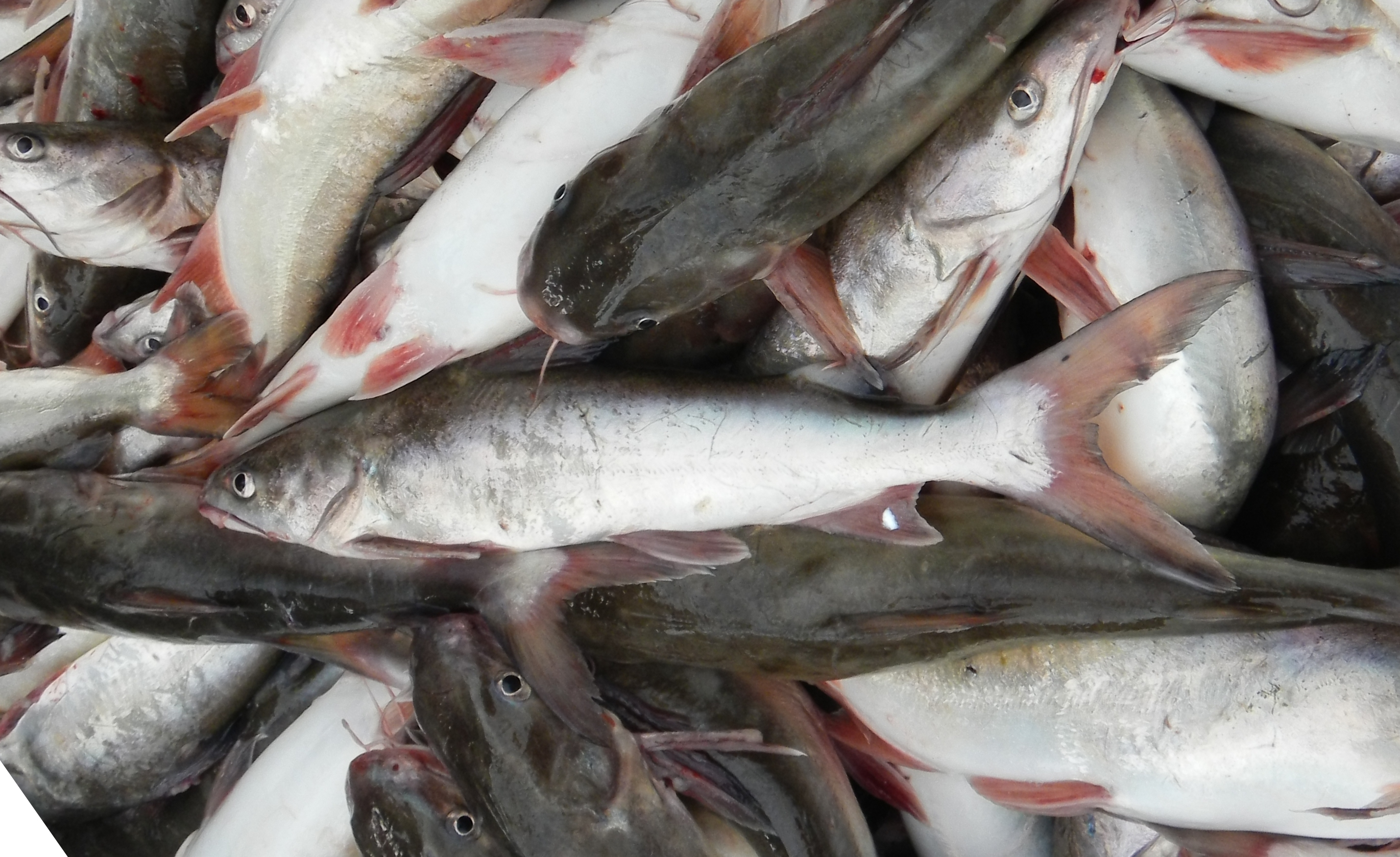

Conservation status
- Data Deficient (IUCN 3.1)

Scientific classification
- Kingdom: Animalia
- Phylum: Chordata
- Class: Actinopterygii
- Order: Siluriformes
- Family: Ariidae
- Genus: Arius
- Species: A. manillensis

Binomial name
- Arius manillensis Valenciennes in Cuvier & Valenciennes, 1840

Synonyms
- Arius manilensis Valenciennes, 1840; Pseudarius philippinus Sauvage, 1880

= Arius manillensis =

Manila sea catfish

Species of fish

Arius manillensis is a species of marine catfish endemic to the island of Luzon, Philippines. It is commonly known as the sea catfish, Manila sea catfish or kanduli. It is fished commercially.

== Taxonomy and nomenclature ==
Arius manillensis was first described by the French zoologist Achille Valenciennes in 1840. It belongs to the subfamily Ariinae of the family Ariidae (ariid or fork-tailed catfishes).

It should not be confused with the closely related Cephalocassis manillensis, also described by Valenciennes in 1840.

Other common names of the species include kandule, dupit, kiti-kiti, tabangongo, and tauti.

== Description ==
Arius manillensis reach a maximum standard length of 29.6 cm (11.7 in) (in males).

== Distribution and habitat ==
Arius manillensis is endemic to the island of Luzon, Philippines. It is found in the area around Manila, Bataan, Laguna, Cavite, and Rizal; including the Pasig River and Laguna de Bay. It inhabits marine, brackish, freshwater, and benthopelagic habitats.

== Biology ==
Arius manillensis are mouthbrooders. The males of the species incubate the eggs within their mouths for six to eight weeks and provide shelter for the young once they hatch. A single instance of a female carrying eggs in her mouth has also been reported. Upon hatching, the young forage for plankton in short bursts but will quickly return to the safety of the mouth of the adult if alarmed. They eventually become independent once they reach a size of 30 to 44 mm (1.2 to 1.7 in). During the entire period, the adults do not eat and their stomachs shrink dramatically.
