= Wenzel Gruber =

Austrian anatomist

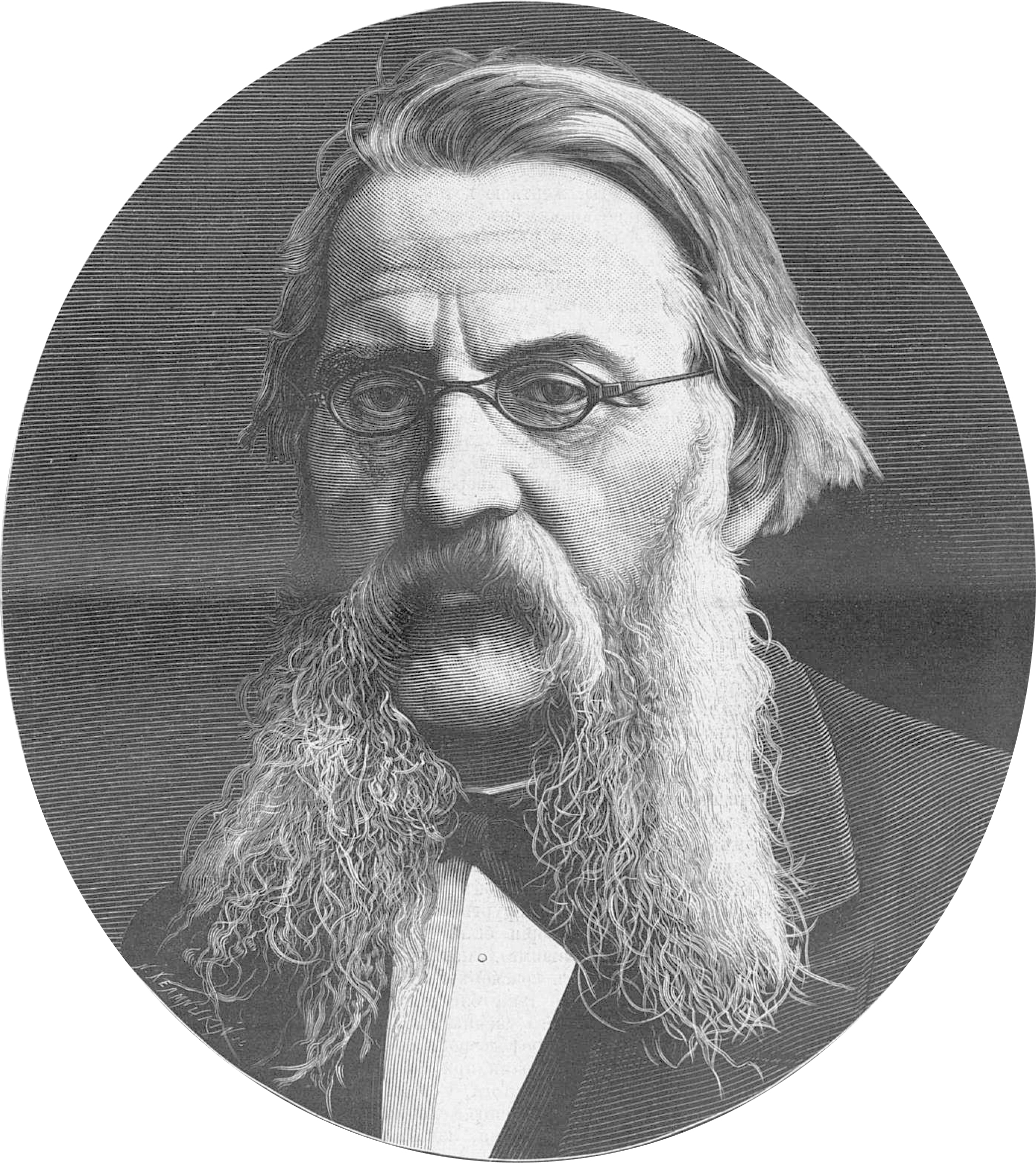

Wenzel Leopold Gruber (24 December 1814 – 30 September 1890) was an Austrian anatomist.

== Life ==
Gruber was born in Krukanice (today part of Pernarec in the Czech Republic). He studied medicine at the University of Prague. Under his teacher Josef Hyrtl, Gruber developed into an outstanding anatomist. In 1847 he received a call from the medical academy of St. Petersburg, where he was the first prosector of Nikolay Pirogov. After the latter's resignation, he took over the leadership of the practical-anatomical institute in 1855. From 1858 he worked as a full professor. In 1888 he moved back to Vienna after more than 40 years of teaching. In 1847 he was elected a member of the Leopoldina.

Gruber succeeded in setting up scientifically driven anatomy lessons in Russia against enormous resistance. He was able to use the large number of human corpses available to him for his researches to find important details, variations and pathological deviations. Gruber, who received many awards and honors, was regarded as the best expert in this particular area.

Gruber wrote the first recorded mention of the foramen lacerum.

He died in Vienna.

== Works ==
- Anatomie eines Monstrum Bicorporeum eigenthümlicher (Thoraco-Gastro-Didymus). Ehrlich, Prag 1844 (Dissertation, Digitalisat at Google Books).
- Anatomie der Eingeweide des Leoparden (Felis leopardus) mit vergleichenden Bemerkungen ueber andere Felis-Arten. Kaiserliche Akademie der Wissenschaften, St. Petersburg 1855 (Digitalisat).
- Beobachtungen aus der menschlichen und vergleichenden Anatomie. 9 Bände. Hirschwald, Berlin 1879–1889.
- Monographie des Musculus flexor digitorum brevis pedis und der damit in Beziehung stehenden Plantarmusculatur bei dem Menschen und bei den Säugethieren. Hof- und Staatsdruckerei, Wien 1889 (Digitalisat).
