= List of fishes of Jamaica =

A list of fishes of Jamaica.

Jamaican waters contain fresh and saltwater fish.

== Saltwater ==
The chief varieties of saltwater fish include:

- Kingfish
- Jack
- Mackerel
- Whiting
- Bonito
- Tuna
- Barracuda

== Estuarine ==
Fish that occasionally enter freshwater and estuarine environments include:

- Snook
- Jewfish
- Mangrove snapper
- Mullet

== Freshwater ==
Fish that spend the majority of their lives in Jamaica's fresh waters include many species of:

- Livebearers
- Killifish
- Gobies
- Perch
- Piranha

== Introduced ==
=== Intentional ===
The Malagasy mountain mullet, American eel and tilapia have been introduced from Africa for aquaculture and are very common.

=== Accidental ===
- Lion fish
- Parrot fish
