= Cephalocassis melanochir =

Conservation status
- Least Concern (IUCN 3.1)

Scientific classification
- Kingdom: Animalia
- Phylum: Chordata
- Class: Actinopterygii
- Order: Siluriformes
- Family: Ariidae
- Genus: Cephalocassis
- Species: C. melanochir

Binomial name
- Cephalocassis melanochir (Bleeker, 1852)

Synonyms
- Arius melanochir Bleeker, 1852; Arius doriae Vinciguerra, 1881; Tachysurus melanochir (Bleeker, 1852)

Species of fish

Cephalocassis melanochir is a species of catfish in the family Ariidae. It was described by Pieter Bleeker in 1852, originally under the genus Arius. It inhabits freshwater lakes and rivers in Malaysia and Indonesia. It reaches a total length of 30 cm (12 in). It feeds on finfish and benthic crustaceans.
