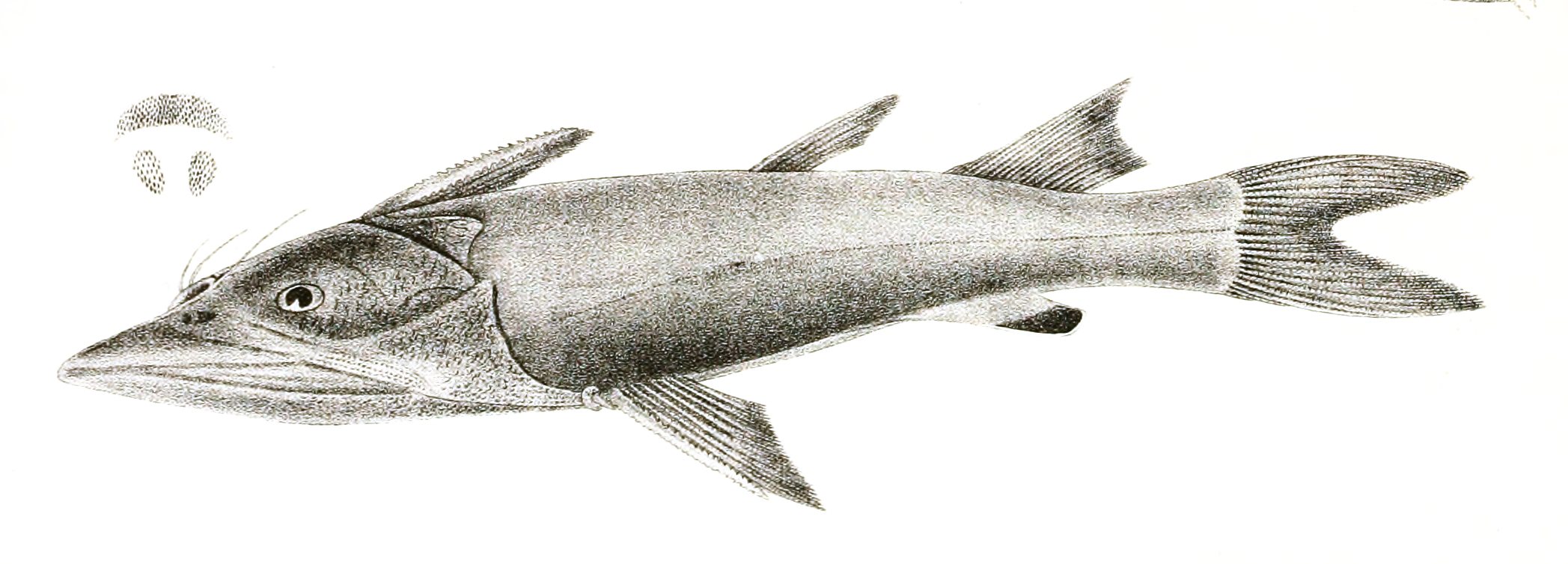

Conservation status
- Least Concern (IUCN 3.1)

Scientific classification
- Kingdom: Animalia
- Phylum: Chordata
- Class: Actinopterygii
- Order: Siluriformes
- Family: Ariidae
- Genus: Arius
- Species: A. acutirostris

Binomial name
- Arius acutirostris Day, 1877

Synonyms
- Tachysurus acutirostris (Day 1877)

= Arius acutirostris =

Species of catfish

Arius acutirostris is a species of catfish in the family Ariidae. It is a fresh- and brackish-water species that inhabits the lower reaches of tidal rivers and estuaries. It is known from the Irrawaddy and Salween River basins in Myanmar and from the Kraburi River estuary in Thailand. It grows to a length 40 cm (16 in) .

A. acutirostris can be locally common and is caught in local fisheries.
