= Arius cous =

Scientific classification
- Domain: Eukaryota
- Kingdom: Animalia
- Phylum: Chordata
- Class: Actinopterygii
- Order: Siluriformes
- Family: Ariidae
- Genus: Arius
- Species: A. cous

Binomial name
- Arius cous Hyrtl, 1859

Species of fish

Arius cous is a species of sea catfish in the family Ariidae. It was described by Josef Hyrtl in 1859. It is known from the western Indian Ocean, in the Middle East.
