= Squirrelheaded catfish =

Scientific classification
- Domain: Eukaryota
- Kingdom: Animalia
- Phylum: Chordata
- Class: Actinopterygii
- Order: Siluriformes
- Family: Ariidae
- Genus: Arius
- Species: A. microcephalus

Binomial name
- Arius microcephalus Bleeker, 1855

Synonyms
- Pseudarius microcephalus (Bleeker, 1855); Arius sciurus Smith, 1931; Tachysurus sciurus (Smith, 1931)

Species of fish

The squirrelheaded catfish (Arius microcephalus) is a species of sea catfish in the family Ariidae. It was described by Pieter Bleeker in 1855. It inhabits tropical marine and brackish waters in the western Pacific region, including eastern Thailand and Borneo. It reaches a maximum total length of 60 cm (24 in).
