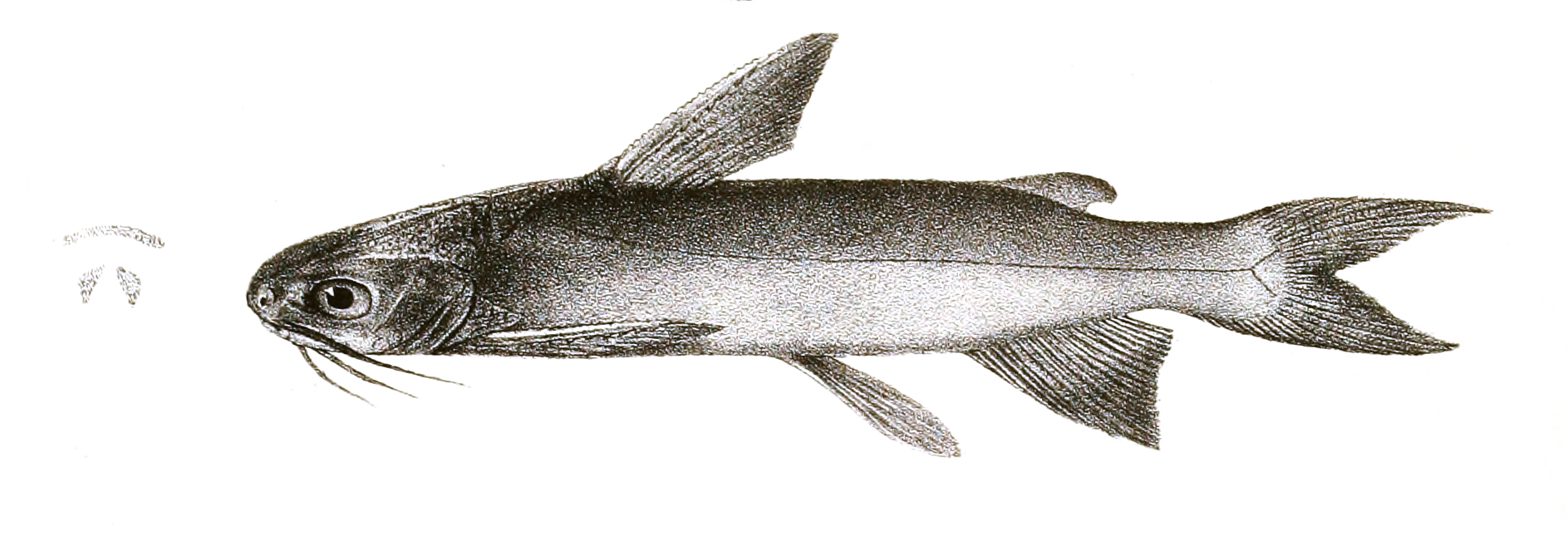

Scientific classification
- Kingdom: Animalia
- Phylum: Chordata
- Class: Actinopterygii
- Order: Siluriformes
- Family: Ariidae
- Genus: Arius
- Species: A. venosus

Binomial name
- Arius venosus Valenciennes, 1840

Synonyms
- Tachysurus venosus (Valenciennes, 1840)

= Veined catfish =

Species of fish

The veined catfish (Arius venosus), also known as the marine catfish, is a species of sea catfish in the family Ariidae. It was described by Achille Valenciennes in 1840. It inhabits tropical marine and brackish waters in the Indo-western Pacific region, including the Mozambique Channel, Myanmar, Indonesia and southern China. It dwells at a depth range of 20 to 50 m (66 to 164 ft). It reaches a maximum total length of 30 cm (12 in), but more commonly reaches a TL of 19 cm (7.5 in).

The diet of the veined catfish includes finfish and benthic crustaceans. It is of commercial interest to fisheries; it is generally marketed fresh.
