= Pernarec =

- Municipality
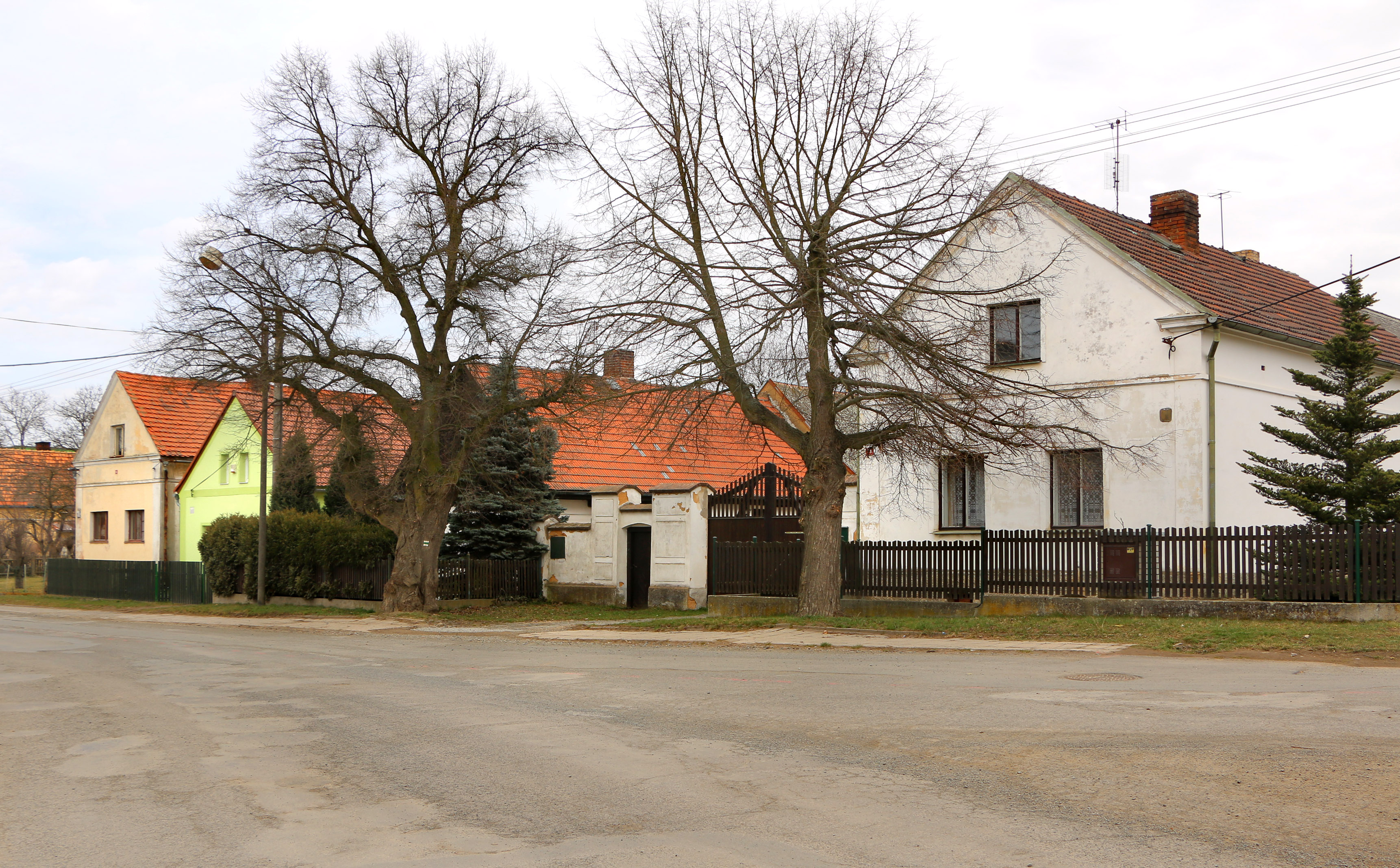
- Common in Pernarec

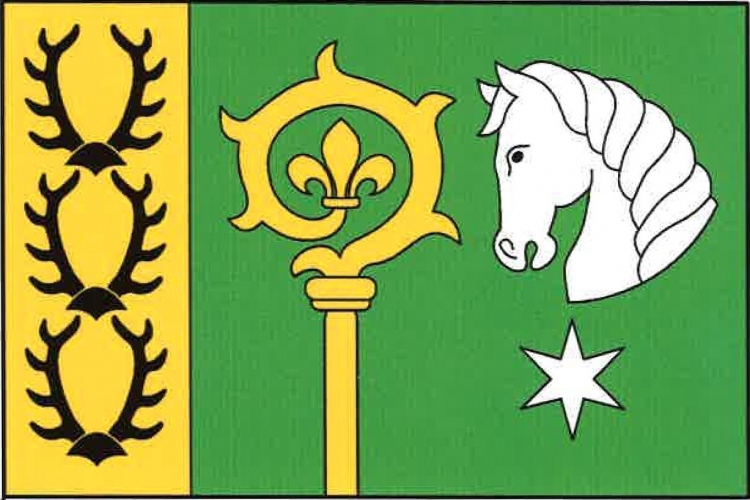
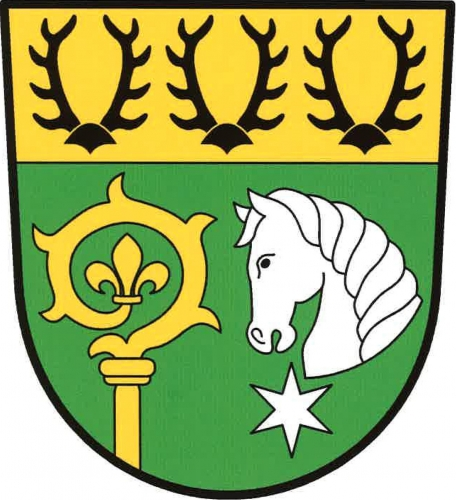
- Flag Coat of arms

- Location in the Czech Republic
- Coordinates: 49°50′26″N 13°6′10″E
- Country: Czech Republic
- Region: Plzeň
- District: Plzeň-North
- First mentioned: 1219

Area
  - Total: 22.93 km^{2} (8.85 sq mi)
- Elevation: 474 m (1,555 ft)

Population (2026-01-01)
  - Total: 734
  - Density: 32.0/km^{2} (82.9/sq mi)
- Time zone: UTC+1 (CET)
  - Summer (DST): UTC+2 (CEST)
- Postal code: 330 36
- Website: www.pernarec.cz

Pernarec is a municipality and village in Plzeň-North District in the Plzeň Region of the Czech Republic. It has about 700 inhabitants.

Pernarec lies approximately 23 kilometres (14 mi) north-west of Plzeň and 99 km (62 mi) west of Prague.

== Administrative division ==
Pernarec consists of six municipal parts (in brackets population according to the 2021 census):

- Pernarec (529)
- Březí (18)
- Krukanice (42)
- Málkovice (15)
- Něšov (1)
- Skupeč (91)

== Demographics ==
Historical population
Year	Pop.	±%
1869	794	—
1880	880	+10.8%
1890	856	−2.7%
1900	841	−1.8%
1910	899	+6.9%
1921	948	+5.5%
1930	987	+4.1%
1950	596	−39.6%
1961	645	+8.2%
1970	703	+9.0%
1980	693	−1.4%
1991	757	+9.2%
2001	754	−0.4%
2011	770	+2.1%
2021	696	−9.6%
Source: Censuses

== Notable people ==
- Wenzel Gruber (1814–1890), Austrian anatomist
