= Hemiarius harmandi =

Scientific classification
- Kingdom: Animalia
- Phylum: Chordata
- Class: Actinopterygii
- Order: Siluriformes
- Family: Ariidae
- Genus: Hemiarius
- Species: H. harmandi

Binomial name
- Hemiarius harmandi Sauvage, 1880

Synonyms
- Arius harmandi (Sauvage, 1880); Arius brevirostris Steindachner, 1901; Tachysurus harmandi (Sauvage, 1880)

Species of fish

Hemiarius harmandi is a species of catfish in the family Ariidae. It was described by Henri Émile Sauvage in 1880. It inhabits marine and freshwaters in Cambodia, Myanmar, Malaysia, Thailand and Vietnam. It reaches a total length of 12 cm (4.7 in).
