= Sand catfish =

Scientific classification
- Kingdom: Animalia
- Phylum: Chordata
- Class: Actinopterygii
- Order: Siluriformes
- Family: Ariidae
- Genus: Arius
- Species: A. arenarius

Binomial name
- Arius arenarius (Müller & Troschel, 1849)

Synonyms
- Bagrus arenarius Müller & Troschel, 1849; Arius fangi Chaux, 1949

Species of fish

The sand catfish (Arius arenarius) is a species of sea catfish in the family Ariidae. It was described by Johannes Peter Müller and Franz Hermann Troschel in 1849, originally under the genus Bagrus. It is found in subtropical brackish and marine waters in the western Pacific, including China Taiwan, and possibly the Philippines. It reaches a maximum standard length of 29 cm (11 in).
