= Spotted sea catfish =

Scientific classification
- Kingdom: Animalia
- Phylum: Chordata
- Class: Actinopterygii
- Division: Teleostei
- Order: Siluriformes
- Family: Ariidae
- Genus: Arius
- Species: A. maculatus

Binomial name
- Arius maculatus (Thunberg, 1792)

Synonyms
- Silurus maculatus Thunberg, 1792; Tachysurus maculatus (Thunberg, 1792); Pimelodus thunberg Lacepède, 1803; Arius thunbergi (Lacepède, 1803); Silurus thunbergi (Lacepède, 1803); Bagrus gagorides Valenciennes, 1840; Arius gagorides (Valenciennes, 1840); Arius borneensis Bleeker, 1851; Hemipimelodus bicolor Fowler, 1935; Hemipimelodus atripinnis Fowler, 1937

Species of fish

The spotted sea catfish (Arius maculatus), also known as the spotted catfish, the sea barbel or the marine catfish, is a species of sea catfish in the family Ariidae. It was described by Carl Peter Thunberg in 1792, originally under the genus Silurus. It inhabits tropical marine, brackish and freshwater in the Indo-western Pacific region, including Bangladesh, India, Pakistan, Myanmar and Sri Lanka. It dwells at a depth range of 50 to 100 m (160 to 330 ft). It reaches a maximum total length of 80 cm (31 in), more commonly reaching a TL of 30 cm (12 in).

The diet of the spotted sea catfish includes detritus, polychaete worms, mollusks, various crustaceans, and milkfish larvae. It has been recorded spawning between the months of January–April on the coast of Mumbai, India, and in the months of September–October on the coast of Karnataka. The eggs are incubated in the mouths of the males, which are known to consume a minute quantity of the eggs to combat starvation during the period of incubation.

The spotted sea catfish is of commercial interest to fisheries. It is primarily marketed fresh, and the air bladders are used in the wine industry as isinglass.
