= Acentrogobius pellidebilis =

Conservation status
- Data Deficient (IUCN 3.1)

Scientific classification
- Kingdom: Animalia
- Phylum: Chordata
- Class: Actinopterygii
- Order: Gobiiformes
- Family: Gobiidae
- Genus: Acentrogobius
- Species: A. pellidebilis

Binomial name
- Acentrogobius pellidebilis Y. J. Lee & I. S. Kim, 1992

Species of goby

Acentrogobius pellidebilis is a species of goby in the family Gobiidae. It is found in Korea.

== Description ==
This species reaches a standard length of 7.0 cm (2.8 in).
