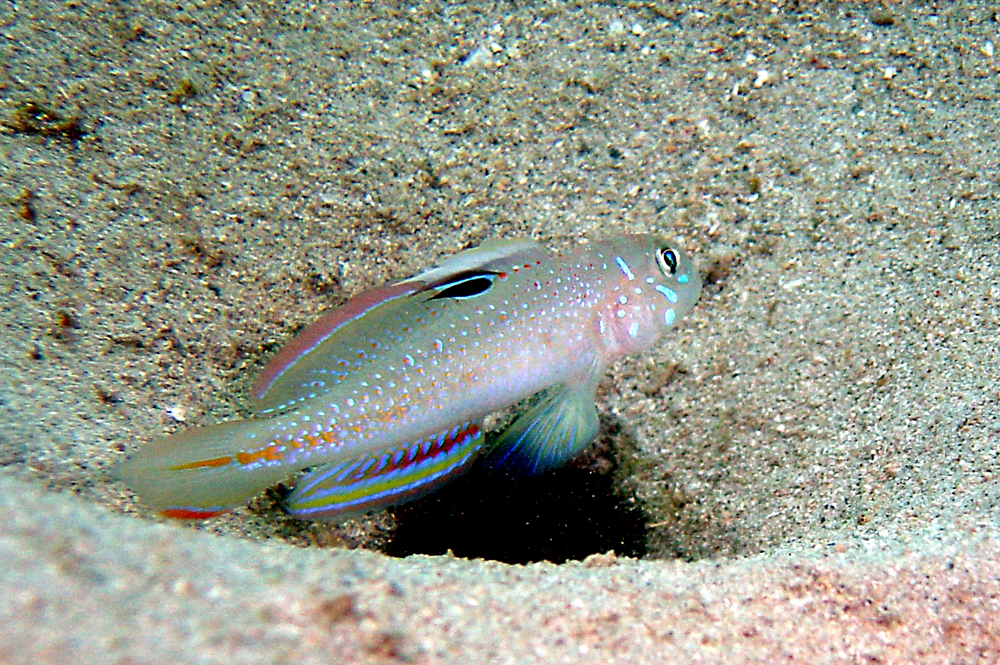

Scientific classification
- Kingdom: Animalia
- Phylum: Chordata
- Class: Actinopterygii
- Division: Teleostei
- Order: Gobiiformes
- Family: Gobiidae
- Genus: Oplopomus
- Species: O. oplopomus

Binomial name
- Oplopomus oplopomus (Valenciennes, 1837)

Synonyms
- Centrogobius notacanthus Bleeker 1874; Gobius bitelatus Cuvier & Valenciennes; Gobius gemmatus (Heckel M.S.); Gobius notacanthus Bleeker 1858; Gobius oplopomus Valenciennes, 1837; Hoplopomus acanthistius Regan 1908; Oplopomus acanthistius (Regan 1908); Oplopomus pulcher Ehrenberg

= Oplopomus oplopomus =

Spinecheek goby

Species of fish

Oplopomus oplopomus, commonly known as the spinecheek goby, is a species of goby native to the Indo-Pacific region. They can grow to a maximum length of 10 centimetres (3.9 in). They inhabit coral reefs.

== Distribution and habitat ==
Spinecheek gobies are native to the Indian Ocean and western Pacific Ocean, occurring from East Africa to the Society Islands and as far north as the Yaeyama Islands, Japan. They inhabit coral reefs at depths of 1 to 30 m (3.3 to 98.4 ft).

== Description ==
The spinecheek goby grows to a maximum length of 10 centimetres (3.9 in). It has an elongated, laterally compressed body. The mouth is slanted downwards, with the lower jaw protruding past the upper jaw. Teeth are present in both rows in multiple rows, with the teeth in the outermost row enlarged. Its lower jaw also contains a pair of curved canines. The eye is wider in diameter than the blunt snout. An open pore is present just behind the eye. Its head does not possess scales. Scales on the body are ctenoid.

The first dorsal fin is elongated and separated from the second dorsal fin. Both have a stiff first spine. The second dorsal fin and the anal fin are roughly the same size. The pectoral fins are rounded and shorter than the length of the head. The ventral fins are pointed and fused with a bridge of skin (a frenum). The caudal fin is rounded and are about the same length as the head.

This goby is reddish-green on its dorsal surface with a number of small black spots. The head has short black lines. Both the body and the head have numerous tiny, iridescent, pale blue, violet, and yellow dots. On the middle of the sides of the body is a row of six longitudinal dark spots. The fins are yellowish-orange in color. The first dorsal fin has a slanting violet stripe, while the second dorsal fin is studded with small dark spots. The pectoral fin is also covered with small spots. The base of the anal fin and the rear portion of the ventral fins are black. The caudal fin has a stripe running through the center. Males have more intense blue markings than females. Juveniles have more black spots and less yellow and blue spots than the adults.

== Taxonomy and nomenclature ==
Spinecheek gobies belong to the genus Oplopomus of the goby family, Gobiidae. The species was first described by the French zoologist Achille Valenciennes in 1837 as Gobius oplopomus.

Spinecheek gobies are known as stekelwang-dikkop in Afrikaans, bia in Tagalog, mano'o-lape in Samoan, and 'o'opu in Tahitian.
