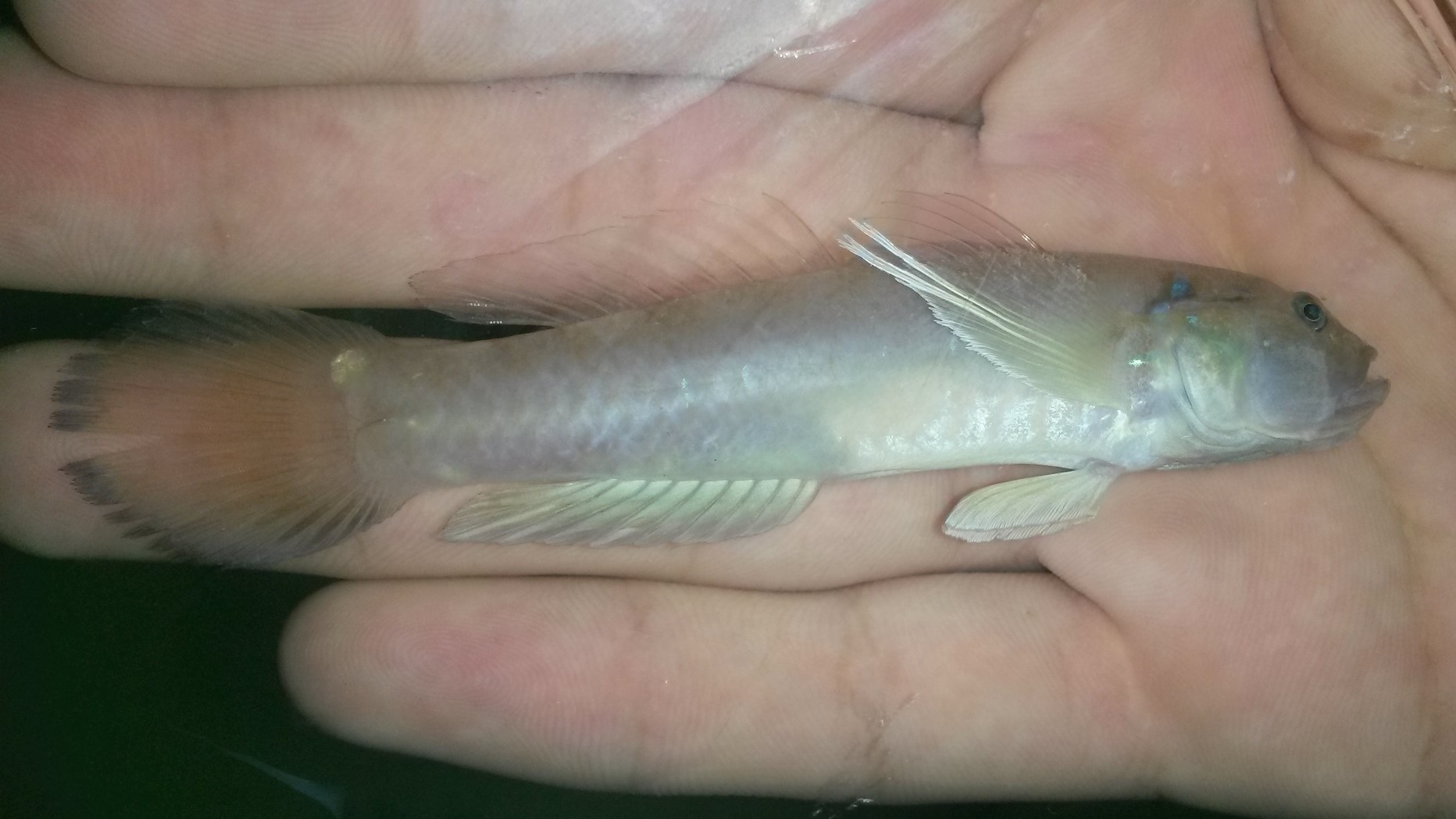

Conservation status
- Least Concern (IUCN 3.1)

Scientific classification
- Kingdom: Animalia
- Phylum: Chordata
- Class: Actinopterygii
- Division: Teleostei
- Order: Gobiiformes
- Family: Gobiidae
- Genus: Acentrogobius
- Species: A. dayi

Binomial name
- Acentrogobius dayi Koumans, 1941

= Acentrogobius dayi =

Species of fish

Acentrogobius dayi, also known as Day's goby, is a species of goby found in the western Indian Ocean from the Persian Gulf to Pakistan. It is also found in brackish and freshwater streams of south-western Asia.

== Description ==
This species reaches a length of 11.0 cm (4.3 in).

== Etymology ==
The fish is named in honor of Francis Day (1829-1889), the Inspector-General of Fisheries in India,
