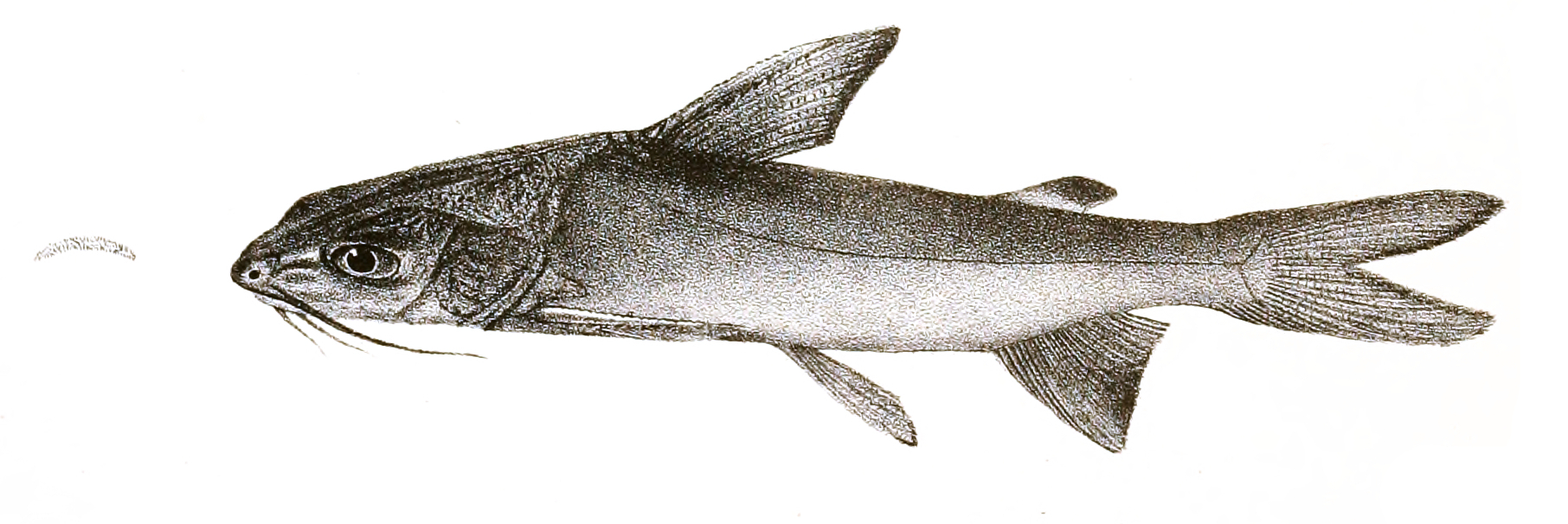

Conservation status
- Data Deficient (IUCN 3.1)

Scientific classification
- Kingdom: Animalia
- Phylum: Chordata
- Class: Actinopterygii
- Division: Teleostei
- Order: Siluriformes
- Family: Ariidae
- Genus: Cephalocassis
- Species: C. jatia

Binomial name
- Cephalocassis jatia (F. Hamilton, 1822)

Synonyms
- Pimelodus jatius Hamilton, 1822; Arius jatius (Hamilton, 1822); Hemipimelodus jatius (Hamilton, 1822)

= Cephalocassis jatia =

Species of fish

Cephalocassis jatia, the river catfish, is a species of catfish in the family Ariidae. It was described by Francis Buchanan-Hamilton in 1822, originally under the genus Pimelodus. It inhabits freshwater bodies and marine waters in Bangladesh, India and Myanmar. It reaches a length of 30 cm (12 in).

The breeding season for river catfish is said to be between May and July. These fishes usually inhabit Tonle Sap Lake, Cambodia.

== Culture ==
In Myanmar, they are known as Nga-yaungs by local fishers. Fishers use a special locally produced soap as bait and leave the hook in the river overnight. The next day, the fishers return to retrieve their catch.
