= Arius brunellii =

Scientific classification
- Domain: Eukaryota
- Kingdom: Animalia
- Phylum: Chordata
- Class: Actinopterygii
- Order: Siluriformes
- Family: Ariidae
- Genus: Arius
- Species: A. brunellii

Binomial name
- Arius brunellii Zolezzi, 1939

Species of fish

Arius brunellii is a species of sea catfish in the family Ariidae. It was described by Giacomo Zolezzi in 1939. It is known only from the Giuba River in Somalia; its type locality. Its known maximum total length is 35 cm (14 in).
