= Nemapteryx macronotacantha =

Scientific classification
- Kingdom: Animalia
- Phylum: Chordata
- Class: Actinopterygii
- Order: Siluriformes
- Family: Ariidae
- Genus: Nemapteryx
- Species: N. macronotacantha

Binomial name
- Nemapteryx macronotacantha (Bleeker, 1846)

Synonyms
- Arius macronotacanthus Bleeker, 1846; Arius parvipinnis Day, 1877; Tachysurus macronotacanthus (Bleeker, 1846)

Species of fish

Nemapteryx macronotacantha is a species of catfish in the family Ariidae. It was described by Pieter Bleeker in 1846, originally under the genus Arius. It inhabits southern and southeastern Asian brackish waters, also occurring in marine and freshwaters. It reaches a maximum total length of 30 cm (12 in).
