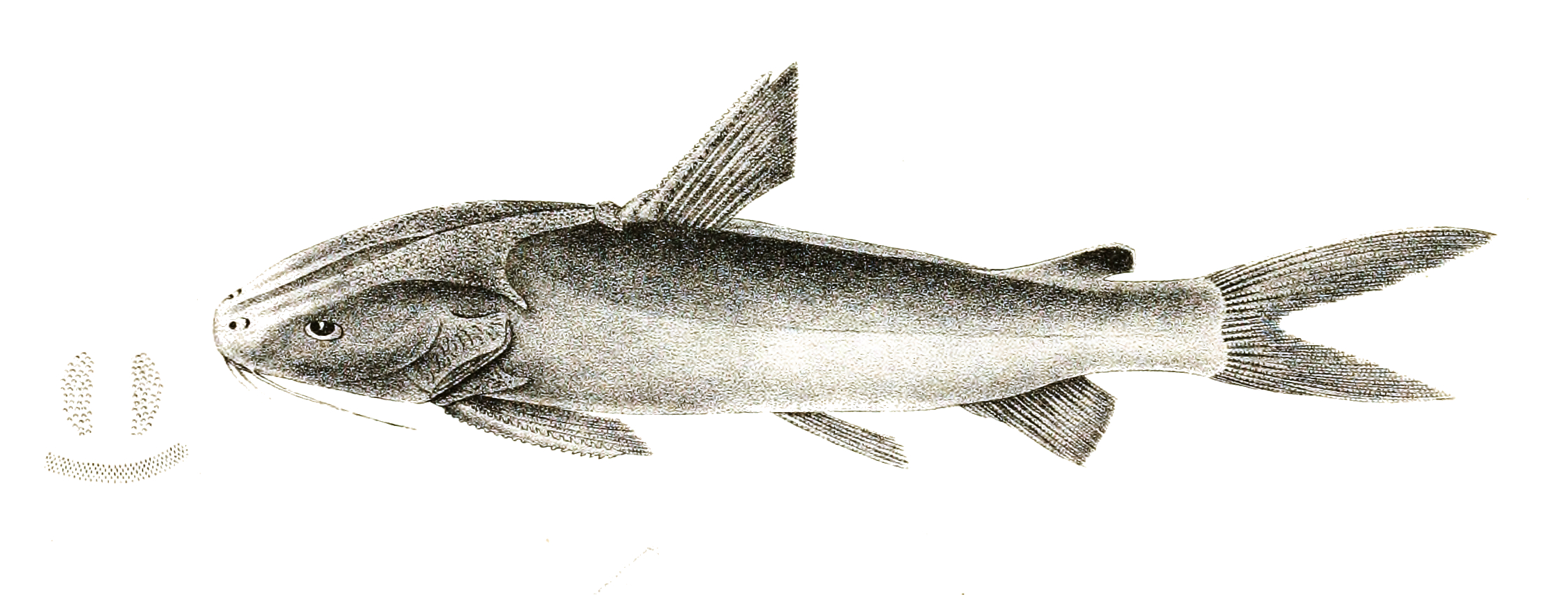

Conservation status
- Near Threatened (IUCN 3.1)

Scientific classification
- Kingdom: Animalia
- Phylum: Chordata
- Class: Actinopterygii
- Order: Siluriformes
- Family: Ariidae
- Genus: Arius
- Species: A. gagora

Binomial name
- Arius gagora (Hamilton, 1822)

Synonyms
- Pimelodus gagora Hamilton, 1822; Tachysurus gagora (Hamilton, 1822); Arias gagora (Hamilton, 1822)

= Gagora catfish =

Species of fish

The Gagora catfish (Arius gagora) is a species of sea catfish in the family Ariidae. It was described by Francis Buchanan-Hamilton in 1822, originally under the genus Pimelodus. It is a migratory species found in the tropical marine, brackish and freshwater of Bangladesh, Myanmar, and India. It reaches a maximum standard length of 91.4 cm (3 ft).

The Gagora catfish is of commercial importance as a food fish, but over-fishing has led to a population decline in the past two decades. Due to the decline, the IUCN redlist has listed the species as Near Threatened since 1st October 2009.
