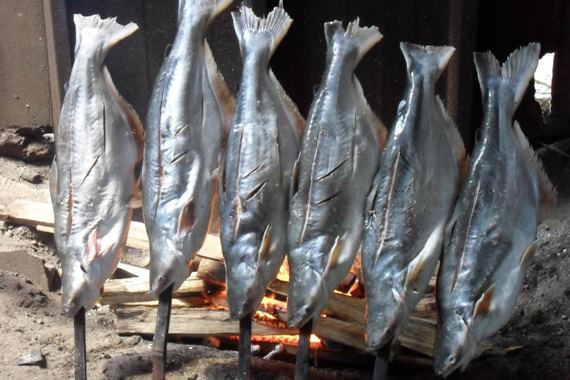

Conservation status
- Data Deficient (IUCN 3.1)

Scientific classification
- Kingdom: Animalia
- Phylum: Chordata
- Class: Actinopterygii
- Order: Siluriformes
- Family: Ariidae
- Genus: Arius
- Species: A. africanus

Binomial name
- Arius africanus Günther, 1867

Synonyms
- Arius falcarius africana Günther, 1867; Arius falcarius africanus Günther, 1867; Tachysurus africanus (Günther, 1867)

= African sea catfish =

Species of fish

The African sea catfish (Arius africanus), also known as the marine catfish, is a species of sea catfish in the family Ariidae. It was described by Albert Günther in 1867. It is found in tropical brackish and freshwater in Tanzania, Madagascar, and the Pangani River. It reaches a maximum standard length of 45 cm (18 in).

The diet of the African sea catfish consists of small finfish and invertebrates. It is of commercial interest to fisheries.
