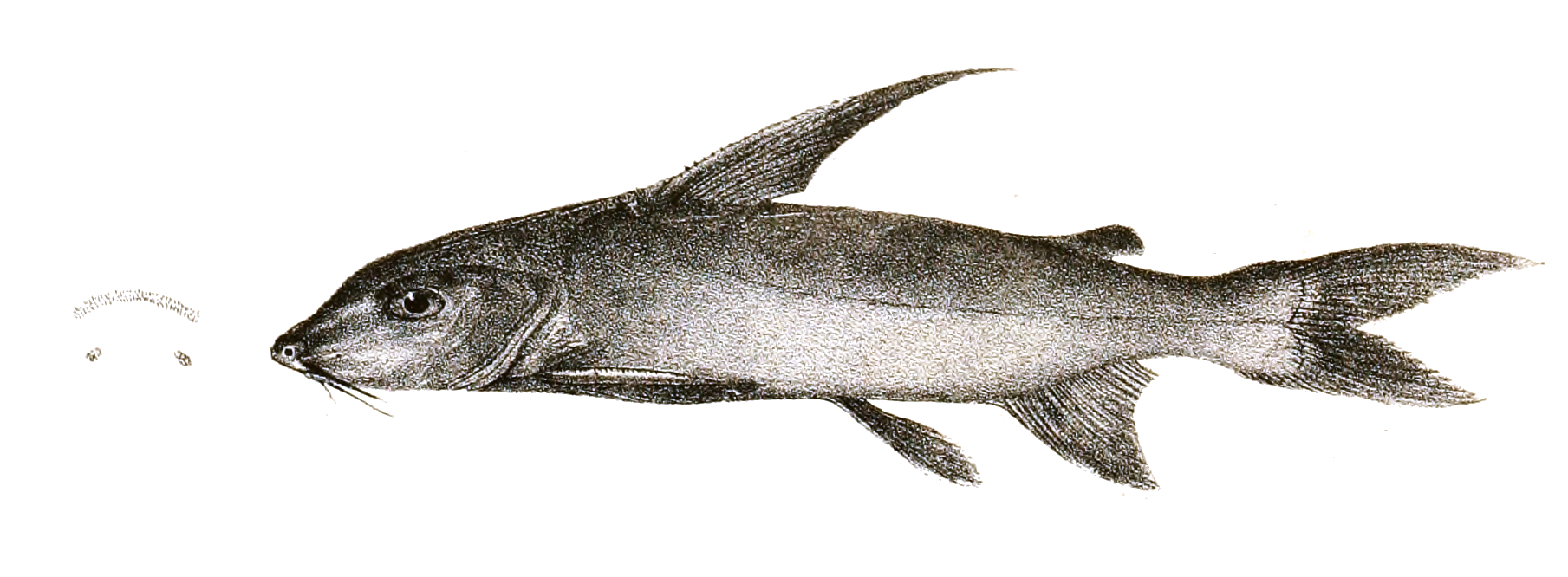

Scientific classification
- Domain: Eukaryota
- Kingdom: Animalia
- Phylum: Chordata
- Class: Actinopterygii
- Order: Siluriformes
- Family: Ariidae
- Genus: Arius
- Species: A. subrostratus

Binomial name
- Arius subrostratus Valenciennes, 1840

Synonyms
- Tachysurus subrostratus (Valenciennes, 1840); Arius subostratus Valenciennes, 1840

= Shovelnose sea catfish =

Species of fish

The shovelnose sea catfish (Arius subrostratus), also called the short-nosed catfish or the marine catfish, is a species of sea catfish in the family Ariidae. It was first described by Achille Valenciennes in 1840.

== Distribution and habitat ==
It is a non-migratory species which inhabits tropical marine and brackish waters in the Indo-western Pacific region, including Indonesia, India, Pakistan, the Philippines and Thailand. It dwells at a depth range of 0 to 20 m (0 to 66 ft). It reaches a maximum NG length of 39.5 cm (15.6 in), while commonly reaching a total length of 12 cm (4.7 in).

== Biology ==
It has been recorded spawning between the months of January–April and September–October in India. Males incubate the eggs in their mouths.

The diet of the shovelnose sea catfish includes detritus, polychaete worms, diatoms, algal weeds, and various crustaceans.

== Uses ==
The shovelnose sea catfish is of commercial value to fisheries; it is mostly marketed fresh.
