= Fleshysnout catfish =

Conservation status
- Data Deficient (IUCN 3.1)

Scientific classification
- Kingdom: Animalia
- Phylum: Chordata
- Class: Actinopterygii
- Order: Siluriformes
- Family: Ariidae
- Genus: Arius
- Species: A. dispar

Binomial name
- Arius dispar Herre, 1926

Synonyms
- Tachysurus dispar (Herre, 1926)

Species of fish

The fleshysnout catfish (Arius dispar) is a species of sea catfish in the family Ariidae. It was described by Albert William Herre in 1926, originally under the genus Tachysurus. It is known from tropical brackish and freshwater in Asia, including the Philippines, Taiwan, and possibly Borneo. It reaches a maximum standard length of 34 cm (13 in).

The diet of the fleshysnout catfish consists of insects such as dragonfly nymphs, the larvae of midges, insect eggs, as well as snails, microcrustaceans, shrimp, finfish and diatoms.
