= Goat catfish =

Scientific classification
- Kingdom: Animalia
- Phylum: Chordata
- Class: Actinopterygii
- Order: Siluriformes
- Family: Ariidae
- Genus: Arius
- Species: A. sumatranus

Binomial name
- Arius sumatranus (Anonymous, referred to E. T. Bennett, 1830)

Synonyms
- Bagrus sumatranus Anonymous [Bennett], 1830; Tachysurus sumatranus (Anonymous [Bennett], 1830)

Species of fish

The goat catfish (Arius sumatranus), also called the marine catfish, is a species of sea catfish in the family Ariidae. Although the author of the species is uncertain, its description has been attributed to Edward Turner Bennett, in 1830. It was originally assigned to the genus Bagrus. It inhabits tropical marine and brackish waters in the Indo-western Pacific region, including eastern Thailand, the Philippines, Pakistan and Indonesia. It reaches a maximum total length of 32 cm (13 in), more commonly reaching a TL of 12 cm (4.7 in).

The diet of the goat catfish consists of benthic invertebrates. It is of commercial interest to fisheries, and is usually marketed fresh.
