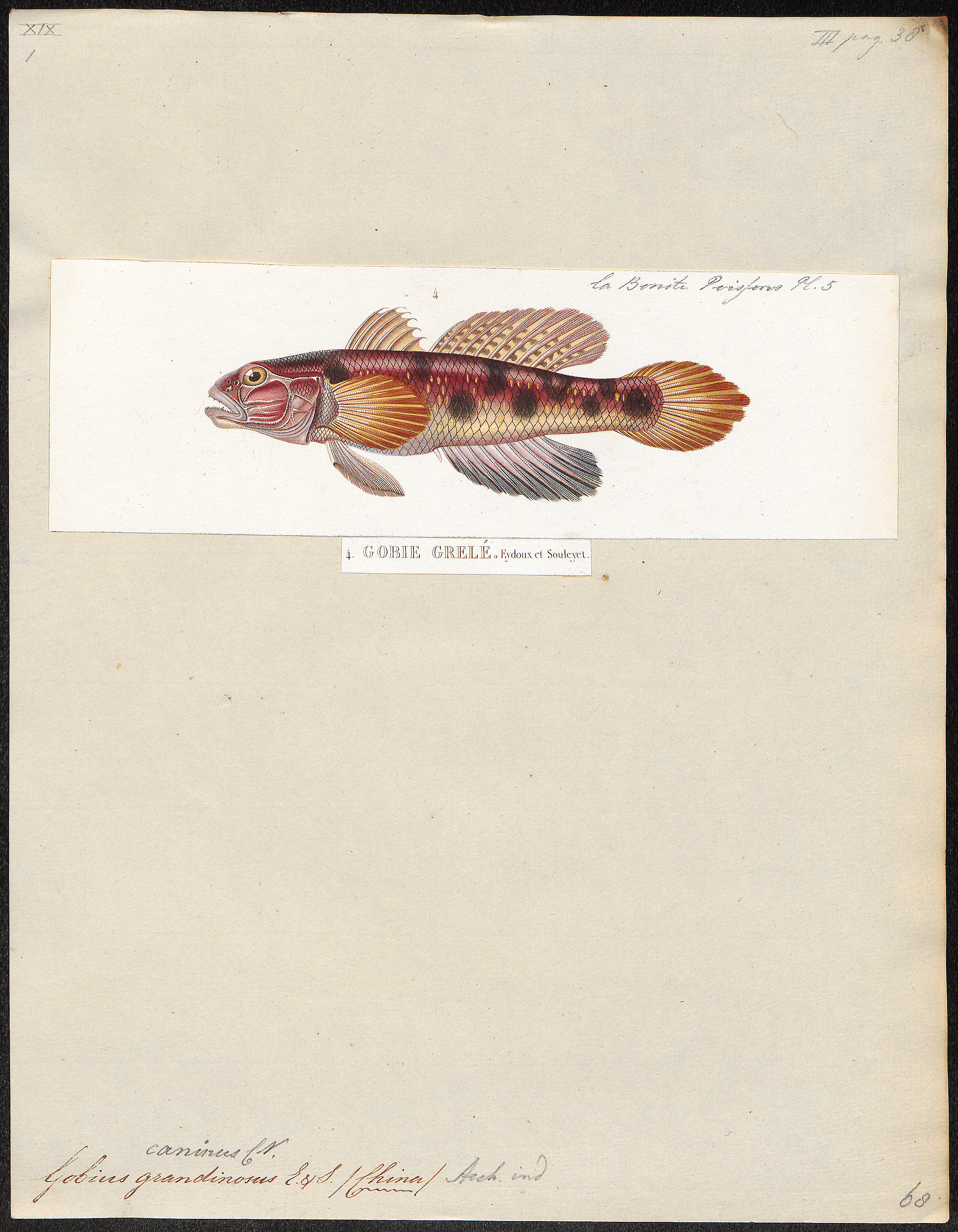

Scientific classification
- Domain: Eukaryota
- Kingdom: Animalia
- Phylum: Chordata
- Class: Actinopterygii
- Order: Gobiiformes
- Family: Gobiidae
- Genus: Acentrogobius
- Species: A. caninus

Binomial name
- Acentrogobius caninus (Valenciennes, 1837)

= Acentrogobius caninus =

Species of goby

Acentrogobius caninus, also known as the tropical sand goby or green-shouldered goby, is an amphidromous benthopelagic species of fish in the family Gobiidae.

== Appearance ==
It is endemic throughout the Indo-West Pacific and found in marine, fresh, and brackish water. It is recognisable by its grey body with brown markings across its body, as well as the distinct dark green spot above its pectoral fins.
