= Hemiarius verrucosus =

Scientific classification
- Kingdom: Animalia
- Phylum: Chordata
- Class: Actinopterygii
- Division: Teleostei
- Order: Siluriformes
- Family: Ariidae
- Genus: Hemiarius
- Species: H. verrucosus

Binomial name
- Hemiarius verrucosus (Ng, 2003)

Synonyms
- Arius verrucosus Ng, 2003; Hemiarias verrucosus (Ng, 2003)

Species of fish

Hemiarius verrucosus, the shovelnose sea catfish, is a species of catfish in the family Ariidae. It was described by Heok Hee Ng in 2003, originally under the genus Arius. It inhabits rivers and estuaries in Laos and Thailand, including the Mekong, Bang Pakong and Chao Phraya Rivers. It reaches a maximum total length of 80 cm (31 in). Its diet includes finfish and shellfish.

In Thailand, the species is believed to have become extinct around 1992–1997. It was formerly abundant in Mueang Chachoengsao District, Chachoengsao Province, occurring from brackish water to freshwater in the Bang Pakong River. It was most frequently encountered when freshwater flowed downstream into the estuary. During periods of high tidal influence, when seawater pushed farther upstream, the fish would migrate away from the increasing salinity into the Chao Phraya River, where it has also not been recorded for many years. Today, only a few fossilized remains have reportedly been found on the riverbed in the area of Ayutthaya Province. Before 1992, there were reports that fishermen could catch several dozen individuals per year, ranging from small fish only a few inches long to specimens weighing 3–5 kg.

Its disappearance from Thailand is believed to have been caused by the construction of a water-control dam on the Bang Pakong River, which prevented the fish from migrating away from areas of increasing salinity.

The species of catfish can also be found in the Mekong River basin, including below Li Phi Falls in Laos, from Khone Phapheng Falls downstream to Kratié Province in Cambodia, and in the Mekong Delta in Vietnam.
