= Arius macracanthus =

Scientific classification
- Domain: Eukaryota
- Kingdom: Animalia
- Phylum: Chordata
- Class: Actinopterygii
- Order: Siluriformes
- Family: Ariidae
- Genus: Arius
- Species: A. macracanthus

Binomial name
- Arius macracanthus Günther, 1864

Species of fish

Arius macracanthus is a species of sea catfish in the family Ariidae. It was described by Albert Günther in 1864. It is known from freshwater in Thailand.
