= Bleeker's catfish =

Scientific classification
- Kingdom: Animalia
- Phylum: Chordata
- Class: Actinopterygii
- Order: Siluriformes
- Family: Ariidae
- Genus: Hemiarius
- Species: H. bleekeri

Binomial name
- Hemiarius bleekeri (Popta, 1900)

Synonyms
- Arius bleekeri Popta, 1900; Cephalocassis bleekeri; Nemapteryx bleekeri

Species of fish

The Bleeker's catfish (Hemiarius bleekeri) is a species of catfish in the family Ariidae. It was described by Canna Maria Louise Popta in 1900, originally under the genus Arius. It inhabits estuaries and marine coasts near Indonesia. It reaches a maximum standard length of 17 cm (6.7 in).
