= Malagasy mountain mullet =

Conservation status
- Data Deficient (IUCN 3.1)

Scientific classification
- Kingdom: Animalia
- Phylum: Chordata
- Class: Actinopterygii
- Order: Gobiiformes
- Family: Gobiidae
- Genus: Acentrogobius
- Species: A. therezieni

Binomial name
- Acentrogobius therezieni Kiener, 1963

Species of fish

Acentrogobius therezieni is a species of goby endemic to hard, fresh waters of Madagascar. This species can reach a length of 10 centimetres (3.9 in) TL.
