= Cephalocassis manillensis =

Conservation status
- Endangered (IUCN 3.1)

Scientific classification
- Kingdom: Animalia
- Phylum: Chordata
- Class: Actinopterygii
- Order: Siluriformes
- Family: Ariidae
- Genus: Cephalocassis
- Species: C. manillensis

Binomial name
- Cephalocassis manillensis (Valenciennes, 1840)

Synonyms
- Pimelodus manillensis Valenciennes, 1840; Hemipimelodus manillensis (Valenciennes, 1840)

Species of fish

Cephalocassis manillensis is a species of catfish in the family Ariidae. It was described by Achille Valenciennes in 1840, originally under the genus Pimelodus. It occurs in the low reaches of large freshwater rivers, in the Philippines. It reaches a total length of 26 cm (10 in).
