= Cephalocassis =

Scientific classification
- Kingdom: Animalia
- Phylum: Chordata
- Class: Actinopterygii
- Order: Siluriformes
- Family: Ariidae
- Subfamily: Ariinae
- Genus: Cephalocassis; Bleeker, 1857

Type species
- Cephalocassis melanochir (Bleeker, 1852)

Genus of fishes

Cephalocassis is a genus of sea catfishes found along the coasts and in rivers and lakes of southern Asia from India to Malaysia. There are currently two described species in this genus.

== Species ==
- Cephalocassis manillensis (Valenciennes, 1840)
- Cephalocassis melanochir (Bleeker, 1852)
