= Francis Day =

British surgeon and ichthyologist, 1829-1889

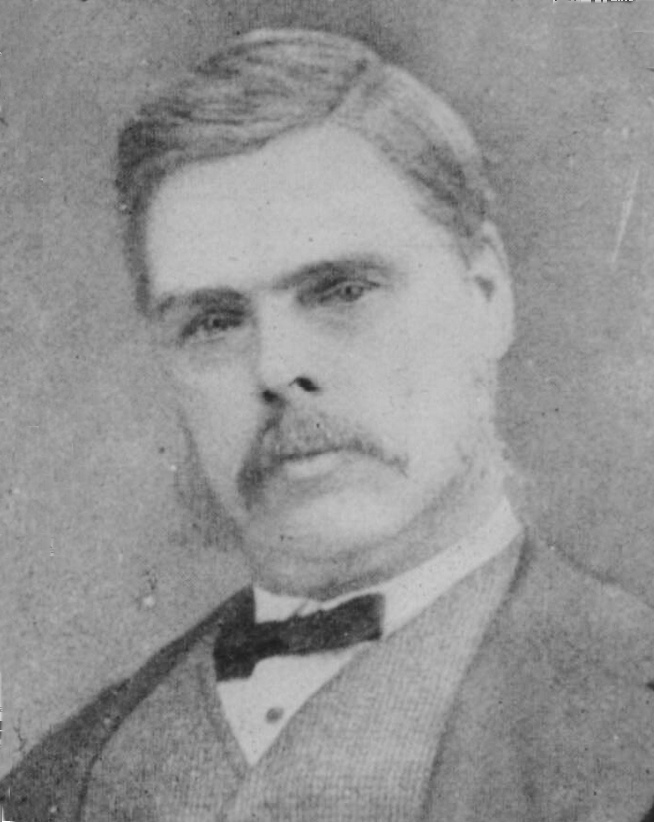
Francis Day

Francis Talbot Day CIE (2 March 1829 – 10 July 1889) was an army surgeon and naturalist in the Madras Presidency who later became the Inspector-General of Fisheries in India and Burma. A pioneer ichthyologist, he described more than three hundred fishes in the two-volume work on The Fishes of India. He also wrote the fish volumes of the Fauna of British India series. He was also responsible for the introduction of trout into the Nilgiri hills, for which he received a medal from the French Societe d'Acclimatation. Many of his fish specimens are distributed across museums with only a small fraction deposited in the British Museum (Natural History Museum, London), an anomaly caused by a prolonged conflict with Albert Günther, the keeper of zoology there.

== Biography ==
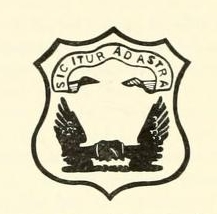
Logo on Day's letterheads with the motto sic itur ad astra ("thus one journeys to the stars")

Day was born in Maresfield, East Sussex, the third son of William and Ann Elliott née Le Blanc. The family estate included two thousand acres with forty tenant farmers during his childhood. William Day was interest in geology, an interest he had inherited from his father, also a William Day who was draper in London who later took to studying and painting minerals and rocks. One of Francis' older brothers took an interest in geology and worked along with Adam Sedgwick. Francis was educated at Shrewsbury, under the Headmaster Dr Kennedy. Taking an interest in medicine, he joined St. George's Hospital in 1849 where he studied under Henry Day, with Francis Trevelyan Buckland as a classmate. He received the MRCS in 1851 and joined as Assistant Surgeon in the Madras Army, British East India Company, in 1852. Service in India took him to Mercara, Bangalore, and Hyderabad and through this period took an interest in natural history. In 1855 he participated in the Madras Exhibition with a display of his bird skins and a note on bird preservation for which he received an honorable mention.

He returned in England in 1857 for a year on sick leave. During this period he was elected to the Linnean Society and in November he married Emma Covey. Returning to India in 1858 in Hyderabad and then Cochin, he took an interest in the fishes of the region. Day took an interest in the fishes of India. He lived in Cochin from 1859 to 1864 where their daughter Fanny Laura was born (November 1861). In 1864 he returned to England on sick leave which was extended for a further year. During this period he communicated a paper on the Fishes of Cochin at a meeting of the Zoological Society of London. In April 1864, a son Francis Meredith was born in London. In 1865 Day wrote to Thomas C. Jerdon who had also worked on catalogue of the freshwater fishes of southern India. Day published The Fishes of Malabar in 1865. On the way back to India in 1866, he went to collect trout eggs in Southampton along with Frank Buckland. He tried to introduce the trout into the streams of Ootacamund but the first attempt failed. A later attempt by W.G. McIvor, who obtained fry from Loch Leven succeeded in introducing them apart from carp and tench. He was then posted to Kurnool and in 1867 was appointed Professor of Materia Medica. Taking leave he returned to Ootacamund to continue his trout introduction experiments. During an outbreak of cholera in Kurnool, he also made studies on the disease. In 1868 he was appointed to head fishery surveys along the Madras and Orissa regions. He also began to catalogue the freshwater fishes of India. Following the death of his wife Emma in 1869, he returned to England in 1870. In the same year he was deputed to inspect fisheries across India and Burma. This included a survey of the Andaman Islands, but an accident forced him to return to England. After recuperating in England he was appointed Inspector-General of Fisheries in 1871, making surveys in the Ganges, Yamuna, Sind and Baluchistan regions. He lived in Calcutta and Simla during this period. He accompanied Allan Octavian Hume (who had supported Day through the Agriculture department) along the Sind river in 1871, making bird collections on his behalf (Day in turn received fish specimens collected by Hume on his bird-collection expeditions). Following the death of his second wife Emily, he returned to England on a two-year leave to write the Fishes of India which also required him to visits to museums across Europe. He offered some of his collections to the British Museum, but they refused to purchase them. Throughout his career, he ran into fierce criticism from Albert Günther.

Day also published two volumes on "Fishes" in The Fauna of British India, Including Ceylon and Burma series in which he described over 1400 species. He also wrote on British and Irish Salmonidae, which he illustrated with nine plates, the colouring of which was done by Miss Florence Woolward.

For his work on trout, he received a silver medal from the French Societe d'Acclimatation in 1872. Francis Day was a Fellow of the Linnaean Society and a Fellow of the Zoological Society; he was created a Companion of the Order of the Indian Empire in 1885. He was decorated with the Order of the Crown of Italy and granted an honorary LLD by the University of Edinburgh.

Although Day was considered an expert on the fishes of India, Albert Günther of the British Museum repeatedly questioned many of Day's observations. Day found Günther coming in the way of his access to specimens at the museum. One outcome of this professional friction resulted in Day's selling an extensive collection of fishes to the Australian Museum in 1883, ignoring the British Museum, the expected recipient. In 1888 his collection of about 400 Indian birds skins was deposited at Cambridge while some fishes went to the British Museum. In 1889 he deposited his drawings of fishes to the Zoological Society of London. After his death, his library was donated to the Cheltenham Public Library.

Day retired in 1877. Day was an active member, and president of the Cheltenham Natural Sciences Society and presented papers to them. He was also an active member of the Cotteswold Naturalists Field Club, where he was vice president. Talking on the vivisection debates at the Cheltenham Natural Sciences Society, Day supported certain forms of animal experimentation for the benefits it yielded for human health.

He died at his residence, Kenilworth House, Cheltenham, on 10 July 1889 of cancer of the stomach and was buried at Cheltenham cemetery.

== Family ==
Day was married twice: first, on 3 November 1857 to Emma (died 1869), daughter of Dr. Edward Covey of Basingstoke; and, secondly, on 13 April 1872 to Emily (died 1873), youngest daughter of the Rev. Thomas Sheepshanks, vicar of St. John's, Coventry. Day had a son Francis Meredith (born 1864) and a daughter Edith Mary (born 1867) from his first wife Emma.

== Taxon named in his honor ==
- Day is commemorated in the scientific name of a species of Indian lizard, Laudakia dayana.
- The fish species Sardinella dayi described and named after Day by Regan in 1917 had been sunk in synonymy but in 2020 it was restored as a valid species.
- The Day's goby, Acentrogobius dayi Koumans, 1941, is a species of goby found in the Western Indian Ocean from the Persian Gulf to Pakistan.
- The Day's round herring (Dayella malabarica) is a relative of the herring that is endemic to southwestern India.

== Works ==
- Day, Francis (1863). The Land of the Permauls, Or, Cochin, Its past and its present.
- Day, Francis (1865). The Fishes of Malabar. Bernard Quaritch, London.
- Day, Francis (1878). The Fishes of India; being a natural history of the fishes known to inhabit the seas and fresh waters of India, Burma, and Ceylon. Volume 1
- Day, Francis (1878). The Fishes of India; being a natural history of the fishes known to inhabit the seas and fresh waters of India, Burma, and Ceylon. Volume 2
- Day, Francis (1888). The Fishes of India; being a natural history of the fishes known to inhabit the seas and fresh waters of India, Burma, and Ceylon. Supplement
- Day, Francis (1889). The Fauna of British India, Including Ceylon and Burma. Fishes. Volume 1. Online
- Day, Francis (1889). The Fauna of British India, Including Ceylon and Burma. Fishes. Volume 2. Online

== Taxon described by him ==
- See Category:Taxa named by Francis Day
