= Pieter Bleeker =

Dutch medical doctor/physician, ichthyologist, & herpetologist (1819–1878)

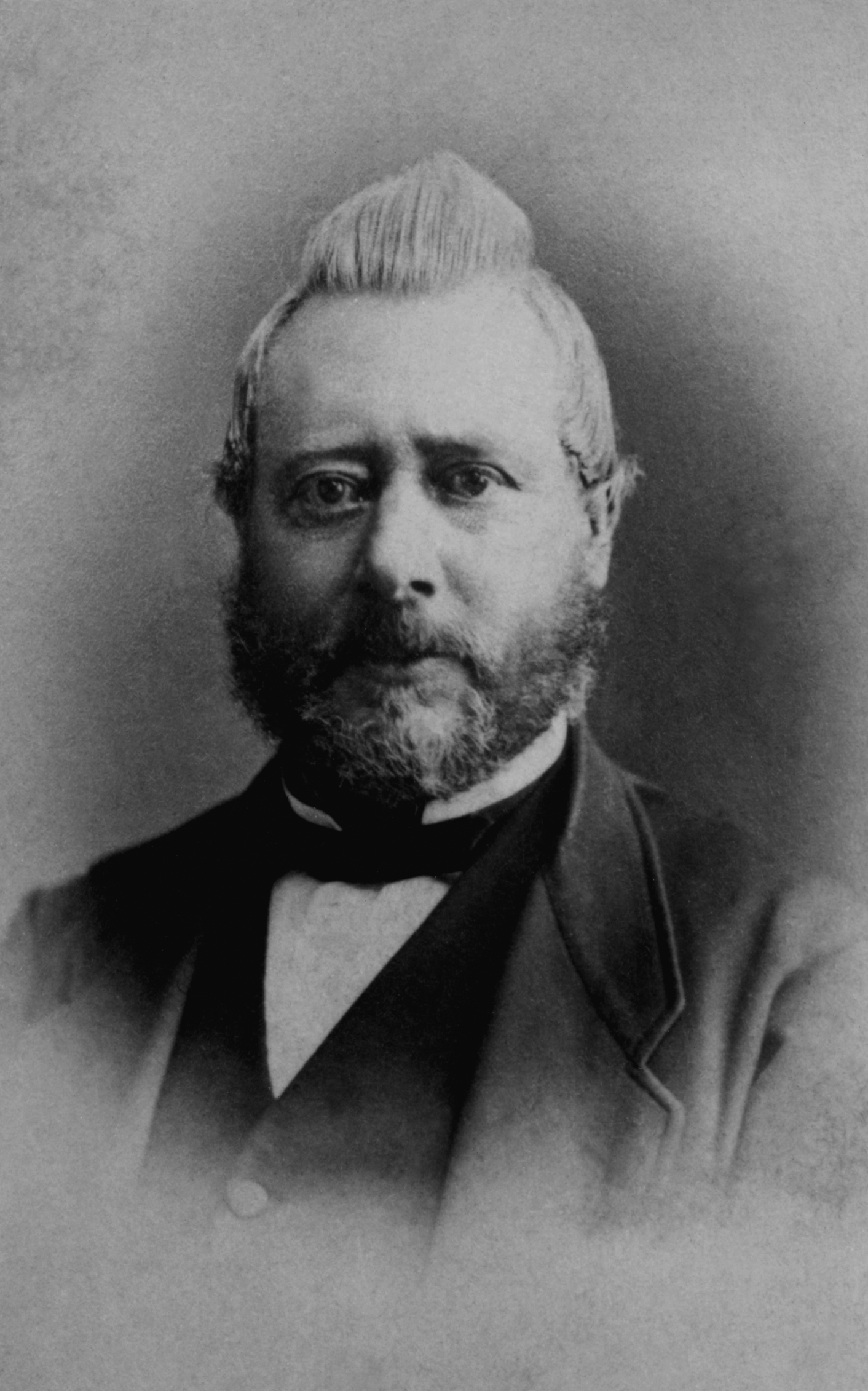
- Born: 10 July 1819; Zaandam, the Netherlands
- Died: 24 January 1878 (aged 58); The Hague, the Netherlands
- Known for: Atlas Ichthyologique des Indes Orientales Néêrlandaises
- Awards: Doctorates honoris causa at Leyden University and Utrecht University, Légion d'honneur
- Scientific career
- Fields: Herpetology; Ichthyology; Tropical medicine
- Institutions: Royal Netherlands Academy of Arts and Sciences; National Museum of Natural History (France); Royal Netherlands Institute of Southeast Asian and Caribbean Studies
- Author abbrev. (zoology): Bleeker

Pieter Bleeker (10 July 1819 – 24 January 1878) was a Dutch medical doctor, ichthyologist, and herpetologist. He was famous for the Atlas Ichthyologique des Indes Orientales Néêrlandaises, his monumental work on the fishes of East Asia published between 1862 and 1877.

== Life and work ==
Bleeker was born on 10 July 1819 in Zaandam. He was employed as a medical officer in the Royal Netherlands East Indies Army from 1842 to 1860, stationed in the Dutch East Indies (now Indonesia). During that time, he did most of his ichthyology work, besides his duties in the army. He acquired many of his specimens from local fishermen, but he also built up an extended network of contacts who would send him specimens from various government outposts throughout the islands. During his time in Indonesia, he collected well over 12,000 specimens, many of which currently reside at the Naturalis Biodiversity Center in Leiden. Bleeker corresponded with Auguste Duméril of Paris. His work in ichthyology and tropical medicine was recognised by two doctorates honoris causa (Leyden University, 1846; Utrecht University, 1849).

After his return to the Netherlands in 1860, he started publishing the Atlas Ichthyologique des Indes Orientales Néêrlandaises, a comprehensive account of his studies done in Indonesia, featuring over 1,500 illustrations. It was published in 36 volumes between 1862 and his death in 1878. Between 1977 and 1983, the Smithsonian republished the work in 10 volumes.

Bleeker published more than 500 papers on ichthyology, describing 511 new genera and 1,925 new species.

He also worked in herpetology, describing at least 14 species of reptiles, most of them described in Reptilien van Agam.

In 1855, he became correspondent of the Royal Netherlands Academy of Arts and Sciences, department Natuurkunde (then Natural Sciences), and in 1862 a member. In 1856, he was elected correspondent for the Muséum national d'histoire naturelle in Paris. In January 1864 he received a French knighthood of the Légion d'honneur. He was president of the Royal Netherlands Institute of Southeast Asian and Caribbean Studies.

Bleeker died on 24 January 1878 in The Hague.

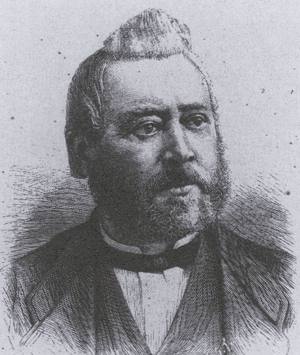

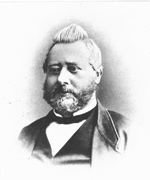

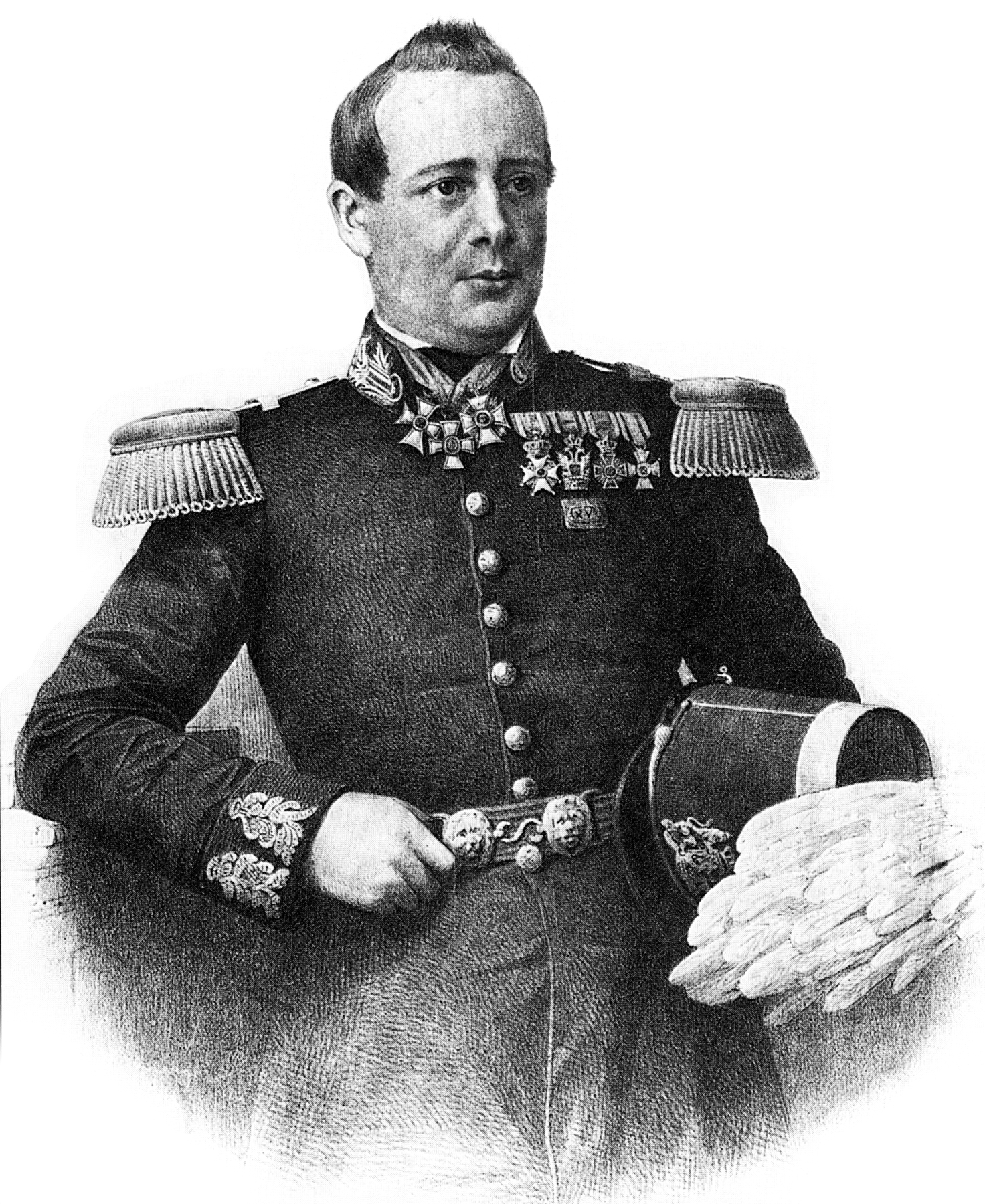

== Taxa named in his honor ==
Fish named after him include:

- Argyrops bleekeri Oshima, 1927
- Bleekeriella leptaspis (Bleeker, 1862) is a species of sea catfish, which was described by Bleeker, and later moved to a monospecific genus.
- Chlorurus bleekeri, known commonly as Bleeker's parrotfish, is a species of marine fish in the family Scaridae.
- Hemiarius bleekeri (Popta, 1900) was named after Bleeker, who collected the first specimen.
- The Shark minnow Luciosoma bleekeri Steindachner, 1878 is named after him.
- Osteochilus bleekeri is a species of cyprinid fish endemic to Borneo and Sumatra.
- The Stone loach Triplophysa bleekeri (Sauvage & Dabry de Thiersant, 1874)

== Taxa described by him ==
- See Category:Taxa named by Pieter Bleeker

== See also ==
- Order (biology)
- Taxonomy (biology)
