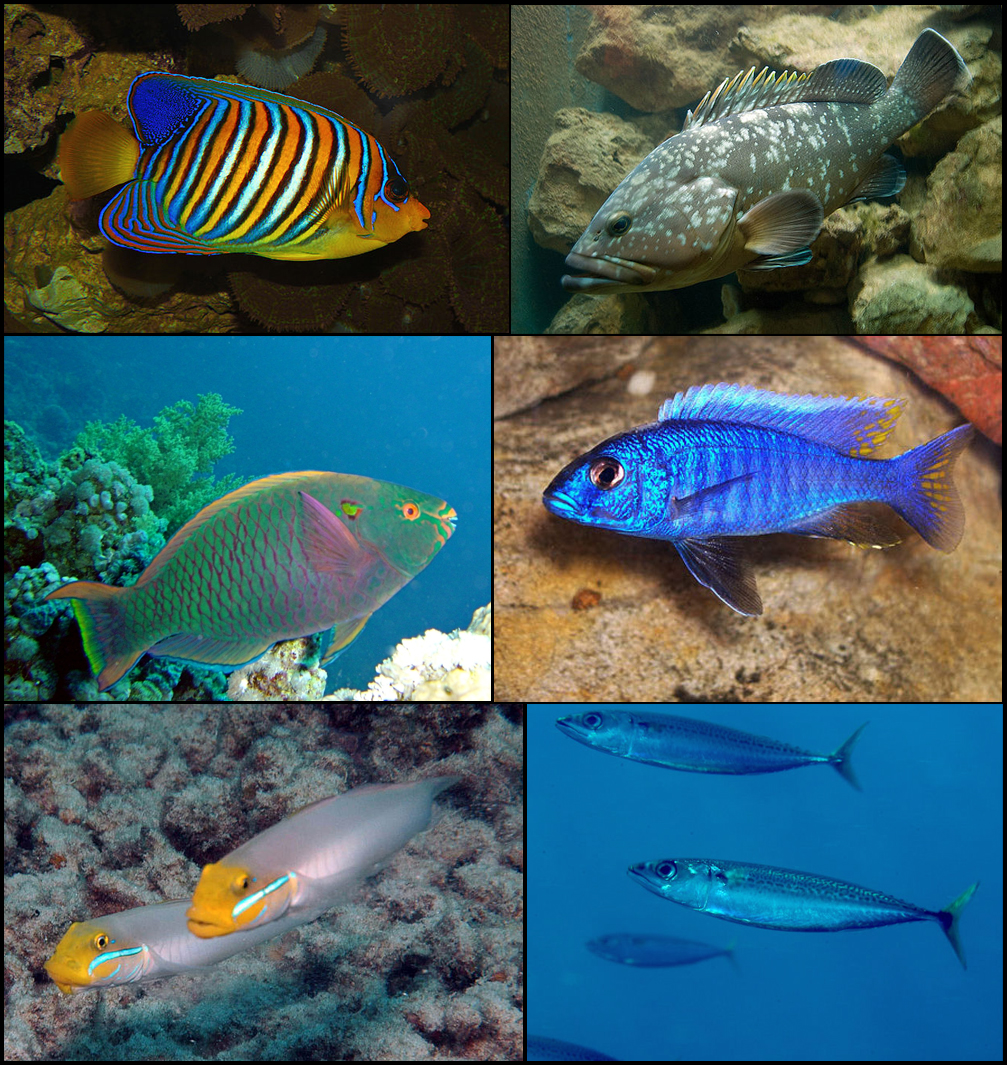
- Percomorph diversity (clockwise from top right): Epinephelus marginatus (Perciformes), Sciaenochromis fryeri (Cichliformes), Scomber australasicus (Scombriformes), Valenciennea strigata (Gobiiformes), Scarus niger (Labriformes), Pygoplites diacanthus (Acanthuriformes)

Scientific classification
- Kingdom: Animalia
- Phylum: Chordata
- Class: Actinopterygii
- Superorder: Acanthopterygii
- Clade: Percomorpha; Cope, 1871

Subgroups
- See text

Synonyms
- Percomorphaceae Betancur-Rodriguez et al., 2013; Acanthopteri

= Percomorpha =

Percomorpha Temporal range: Santonian–present Possible Cenomanian record

Clade of ray-finned fishes

Percomorpha (from Latin perca 'perch' and Ancient Greek μορφή (morphḗ) 'shape, appearance') is an extremely large and diverse clade of ray-finned fish.

== Evolution ==
Percomorpha are the most diverse group of teleost fish today. Teleosts, and percomorphs in particular, thrived during the Cenozoic era. Fossil evidence shows that there was a major increase in size and abundance of teleosts immediately after the mass extinction event at the Cretaceous-Paleogene boundary c. 66 Ma ago. The oldest known percomorph fossils are of the early tetraodontiforms Protriacanthus and Cretatriacanthidae from the Santonian to Campanian of Italy and Slovenia. A higher diversity of early percomorphs is also known from the Campanian of Nardò, Italy, and these also show some level of diversification into modern orders, with representatives of the Syngnathiformes and Tetraodontiformes known. Possibly the oldest percomorph is Plectocretacicus from the Cenomanian of Lebanon, which may be a stem-tetraodontiform; however, some morphological analyses indicate that it shows similarities with non-percomorph groups.

=== Taxonomy ===
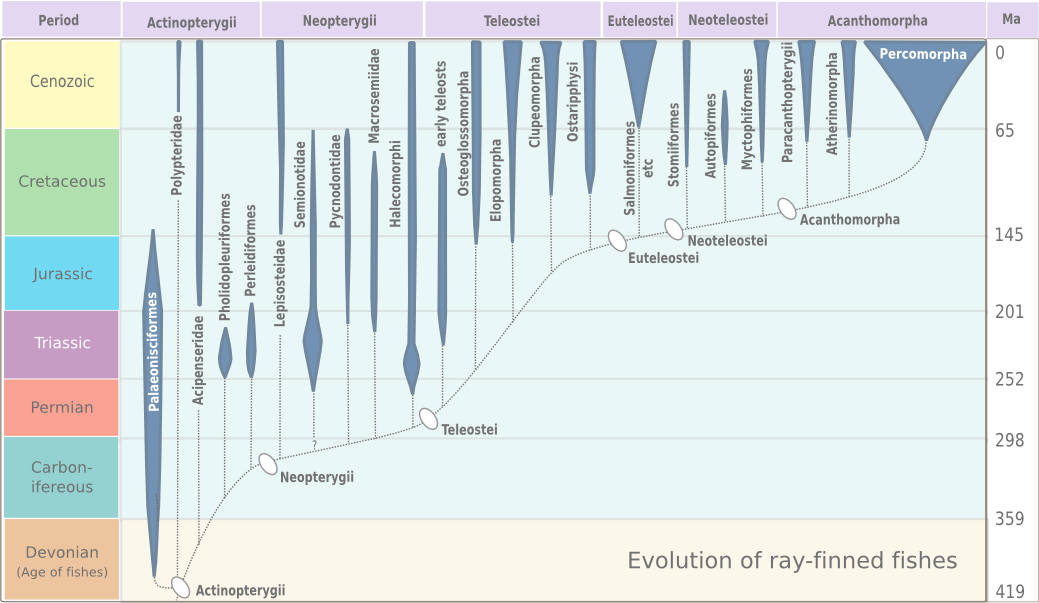
Evolution of ray-finned fishes, Actinopterygii, from the Devonian to the present as a spindle diagram. The width of the spindles are proportional to the number of families as a rough estimate of diversity. The diagram is based on Benton, M. J. (2005) Vertebrate Palaeontology, Blackwell, 3rd edition, Fig 7.13 on page 185.

Many of the orders placed in Percomorpha today were originally placed in an expanded Perciformes, hence many sources often referring to that order as the most diverse vertebrate clade. However, more recent studies have found such a placement to be paraphyletic, and many have thus been moved to their orders within Percomorpha.

The Percomorpha are an extremely diverse group with at least 22 orders according to Eschmeyer's Catalog of Fishes. Other authorities find a different number of orders depending on the classification used.

Numerous fossil percomorphs are known from the Late Cretaceous onwards, but most of these prior to the Eocene, and many afterwards, cannot be confidently assigned to extant percomorph lineages. In the past they were placed within an expanded Perciformes, as with many extant groups, a treatment that is now known to be paraphyletic.

The following taxonomy is based on Eschmeyer's Catalog of Fishes (2025), with additional suborders based on other studies:

- Clade Percomorpha
  - Subseries Ophidiida
    - Order Ophidiiformes
      - Suborder Ophidioidei – cusk-eels, pearlfishes and allies (4 families)
      - Suborder Bythoidei – viviparous and false brotulas (2 families)
  - Subseries Batrachoidida
    - Order Batrachoidiformes – toadfishes (1 family)
  - Subseries Gobiida
    - Order Gobiiformes
      - Suborder Apogonoidei (=order Kurtiformes sensu auct.) – nurseryfishes and cardinalfishes (2 families)
      - Suborder Trichonotoidei – sand divers (1 family)
      - Suborder Gobioidei – gobies, sleepers and allies (7 families)
  - Subseries Syngnatharia
    - Order Syngnathiformes
      - Suborder Dactylopteroidei – seamoths and flying gurnards (2 families)
      - Suborder Mulloidei – goatfishes (1 family)
      - Suborder Callionymoidei – dragonets (2 families)
      - Suborder Syngnathoidei – seahorses, pipefish, trumpetfish, cornetfish and shrimpfishes (5 families)
  - Subseries Pelagiaria
    - Order Scombriformes
      - Suborder Stromateoidei – medusafishes, driftfishes, butterfishes, squaretails, ariommas and allies (6 families)
      - Suborder Scombroidei – mackerel, tunas, manefishes, pomfrets, cutlassfishes, bluefish, swallowers, ragfish and allies (10 families)
  - Subseries Anabantaria
    - Order Synbranchiformes
      - Suborder Mastacembeloidei – freshwater spiny eels and earthworm eels (2 families)
      - Suborder Indostomoidei – armored sticklebacks (1 family)
      - Suborder Synbranchoidei – swamp eels (1 family)
    - Order Anabantiformes
      - Suborder Anabantoidei – gouramies and fighting fishes (3 families)
      - Suborder Channoidei – snakeheads (2 families)
      - Suborder Nandoidei – Asian leaffishes, chameleonfishes, and mudperches (3 families)
  - Subseries Carangaria
    - Order Carangiformes
      - Suborder Centropomoidei – barracudas, lates perches, snooks and false trevally (4 families)
      - Suborder Pleuronectoidei – flatfishes and threadfins (17 families)
      - Suborder Toxotoidei – archerfishes and beachsalmons (2 families)
      - Suborder Nematistioidei – roosterfish (1 family)
      - Suborder Menoidei – moonfish and billfishes (3 families)
      - Suborder Carangoidei – jacks, trevallies, pompanos, remoras, cobias and dolphinfishes (4 families)
  - Subseries Ovalentaria
    - Order Atheriniformes
      - Suborder Atherinopsoidei – Neotropical silversides (1 family)
      - Suborder Atherinoidei – Old World silversides, rainbowfishes, priapumfishes and allies (10 families)
    - Order Beloniformes
      - Suborder Adrianichthyoidei – ricefishes and buntingis (1 family)
      - Suborder Belonoidei – sauries, needlefishes, halfbeaks and flyingfishes (5 families)
    - Order Cyprinodontiformes
      - Suborder Aplocheiloidei – Old and New World rivulines (3 families)
      - Suborder Cyprinodontoidei – killifishes, pupfishes, splitfins, livebearers, lampeyes and four-eyed fishes (11 families)
    - Order Cichliformes – cichlids, leaffishes and convict blenny (3 families)
    - Order Mugiliformes – mullets and Asiatic glassfishes (2 families)
    - Order Blenniiformes
      - Unranked clades – dottybacks, roundheads, damselfishes, clownfishes, surfperches and jawfishes (6 families)
      - Suborder Gobiesocoidei – clingfishes (1 family)
      - Suborder Blennioidei – blennies (6 families)
  - Subseries Eupercaria
    - Order Perciformes
      - Suborder Percoidei – perches, darters, seabasses, groupers, anthias, weeverfishes and duckbills (9 families)
      - Suborder Notothenioidei – icefishes, toothfishes, Antarctic dragonfishes and allies (8 families)
      - Suborder Scorpaenoidei – scorpionfishes, stonefishes, rockfishes, flatheads, searobins and allies (11 families)
      - Suborder Cottoidei – sculpins, psychrolutes, snailfishes, sablefishes, greenlings, poachers, sandfishes, lumpfishes and allies (11 families)
      - Suborder Gasterosteoidei – sticklebacks, Korean sandlance and tubesnouts (3 families)
      - Suborder Zoarcoidei – eelpouts, wolffishes, pricklebacks, gunnels, prowfish and allies (14 families)
    - Order Centrarchiformes
      - Suborder Percalatoidei – Australian basses (1 undescribed family)
      - Suborder Terapontoidei – grunters, sea chubs, flagtails, knifejaws, stripeys and allies (9 families)
      - Suborder Centrarchoidei – freshwater sunfish, Chinese perches, oldwives, temperate perch, jutjaws and allies (7 families)
      - Suborder Cirrhitioidei – hawkfishes, kelpfishes, marblefishes, fingerfins and trumpeters (5 families)
    - Order Labriformes
      - Suborder Labroidei – wrasses, parrotfishes, false scorpionfish and weed whitings (3 families)
      - Suborder Uranoscopoidei – sandlances, stargazers, southern sandfishes, sandperches and torrentfish (5 families)
    - Order Acropomatiformes (=Pempheriformes) – lanternbellies, sweepers, gnomefishes, wreckfishes, banjofish, oceanic basslets, armorheads and allies (20 families)
    - Order Acanthuriformes – surgeonfishes, butterflyfishes, rabbitfishes, marine angelfishes, drumfish, grunts, ponyfishes, mojarras, snappers, temperate basses, spadefishes, porgies, moonyfish, tripletails, tilefish, scats, bigeyes, boarfishes and allies (30 families)
    - Order Lophiiformes – anglerfish
      - Suborder Lophioidei – goosefishes (1 family)
      - Suborder Ogcocephaloidei – batfishes (1 family)
      - Suborder Antennarioidei – frogfishes and handfishes (1 family)
      - Suborder Chaunacoidei – sea toads (1 family)
      - Suborder Ceratioidei – deep-sea anglerfish (11 families)
    - Order Tetraodontiformes
      - Suborder Triacanthoidei – spikefishes and triplespines (2 families)
      - Suborder Tetraodontoidei – pufferfishes, porcupinefishes, ocean sunfishes and allies (4 families)
      - Suborder Balistoidei – boxfishes, filefishes, triggerfishes and allies (4 families)

=== Phylogeny ===
==== External relationships ====
The two cladograms below are based on Betancur-R et al., 2017. Percomorphs are a clade of teleost fishes. The first cladogram shows the interrelationships of percomorphs with other living groups of teleosts.

- Teleostei
  - Elopomorpha (Elopiformes, Albuliformes, Notacanthiformes, Anguilliformes)
  - Osteoglossocephala
    - Osteoglossomorpha (Hiodontiformes, Osteoglossiformes)
    - Clupeocephala
      - Otocephala
        - Clupei (Clupeiformes)
        - - Alepocephali (Alepocephaliformes)
          - Ostariophysi (Gonorynchiformes, Cypriniformes, Characiformes, Gymnotiformes, Siluriformes)
      - Euteleostei
        - - Lepidogalaxii
            Lepidogalaxiiformes (salamanderfish)
        - - Protacanthopterygii (Argentiniformes, Galaxiiformes, Esociformes, Salmoniformes)
          - - Stomiati (Stomiiformes, Osmeriformes)
            - Neoteleostei
              - Ateleopodia
                Ateleopodidae (jellynoses)
              - Eurypterygia
                - Aulopa
                  Aulopiformes (lizardfish)
                - Ctenosquamata
                  - Scopelomorpha
                    Myctophiformes (lanternfish)
                  - Acanthomorpha
                    - - Lampripterygii (Lampriformes)
                      - Paracanthopterygii (Percopsiformes, Zeiformes, Stylephoriformes, Gadiformes)
                    - - Polymixiipterygii
                        Polymixiiformes (beardfish)
                      - Acanthopterygii
                        - - Berycimorphaceae
                            - Beryciformes (alfonsinos, whalefishes)
                            - Trachichthyiformes (pinecone fishes, slimeheads)
                        - - Holocentrimorphaceae
                            Holocentriformes (squirrelfish, soldier fishes)
                          - Percomorpha

==== Internal relationships ====
The following cladogram shows the evolutionary relationships of the various groups of extant percomorph fishes:

- Percomorpha
  - - Ophidiaria
      Ophidiiformes (cusk-eels)
  - - - Batrachoidaria
        Batrachoididae (toadfishes)
    - - - Pelagiaria
          Scombriformes (tunas, mackerel, etc.)
        - Syngnatharia
          Syngnathiformes (seahorses, seadragon, etc.)
      - - - Gobiaria
            - Gobiiformes (gobies)
            - Kurtiformes (nurseryfishes, cardinalfishes)
        - - - - Anabantaria
                - Anabantiformes (snakeheads, Siamese fighting fish, gouramies)
                - Synbranchiformes
              - Carangaria
                - - Polynemidae (threadfins)
                  - - Lactariidae (false trevally)
                    - Menidae (moonfish)
                - - - Part of "Carangiformes"
                      - Nematistiidae (roosterfish)
                      - - Echeneidae (remoras)
                        - - Coryphaenidae (dolphinfish)
                          - Rachycentridae (cobia)
                  - - Sphyraenidae (barracudas)
                    - - - Centropomidae (snooks)
                        - Pleuronectiformes (flatfish)
                      - - - Part of "Carangiformes"
                            Carangidae (jacks)
                        - - Istiophoriformes (billfish)
                          - - Leptobramidae (beachsalmons)
                            - Toxotidae (archerfish)
            - - Ovalentaria
                - - Cichlomorphae
                    - Cichliformes (cichlids, convict blennies)
                    - Polycentridae (leaffish)
                  - Atherinomorphae
                    - Beloniformes (needlefish, flying fish, halfbeaks)
                    - - Atheriniformes (silversides, rainbowfish, etc.)
                      - Cyprinodontiformes (tooth-carps)
                - - Ambassidae (Asiatic glassfishes)
                  - - - Congrogadidae (eel blenny)
                      - Pomacentridae (damselfishes, clownfish)
                    - - - Embiotocidae (surfperches)
                        - Mugilomorphae
                          Mugiliformes (mullets)
                      - - Lipogramma
                        - - Plesiopidae (roundheads)
                          - - Pseudochromidae (dottybacks)
                            - - Grammatidae (basslets)
                              - - Opistognathidae (jawfishes)
                                - Blenniimorphae
                                  - Blenniiformes (blennies, clinids, sand stargazers)
                                  - Gobiesociformes (clingfishes)
          - - Eupercaria
              - Gerreiformes (mojarras)
              - - - Uranoscopiformes (stargazers)
                  - - Centrogenyidae (false scorpionfish)
                    - Labriformes (wrasses, cales, parrotfish)
                - - - Perciformes (perches, sticklebacks, scorpionfishes, etc.)
                    - - Centrarchiformes (black basses, temperate perches, etc.)
                      - Pempheriformes (sweepers, banjofish, etc.)
                  - - - Moronidae (temperate basses)
                      - Sillaginidae (smelt-whitings)
                    - - Ephippiformes (spadefishes, batfishes)
                      - - - - Chaetodontiformes (butterflyfishes)
                            - Sciaenidae (drums, croakers)
                          - - - Acanthuriformes (surgeonfishes, ponyfishes)
                              - Monodactylidae (moonyfishes, fingerfishes)
                            - - Emmelichthyidae (rovers)
                              - - Pomacanthidae (angelfishes)
                                - - Lutjaniformes (snappers)
                                  - - Callanthiidae (splendid perches)
                                    - Malacanthidae (tilefishes)
                        - - - Lobotiformes (tripletails)
                            - Spariformes
                          - - Siganidae (rabbitfishes)
                            - - - Priacanthiformes (bigeyes, bandfishes)
                                - Scatophagidae (scats)
                              - - Caproiformes (boarfishes)
                                - - Lophiiformes (anglerfishes)
                                  - Tetraodontiformes (pufferfishes, triggerfishes, etc.)
