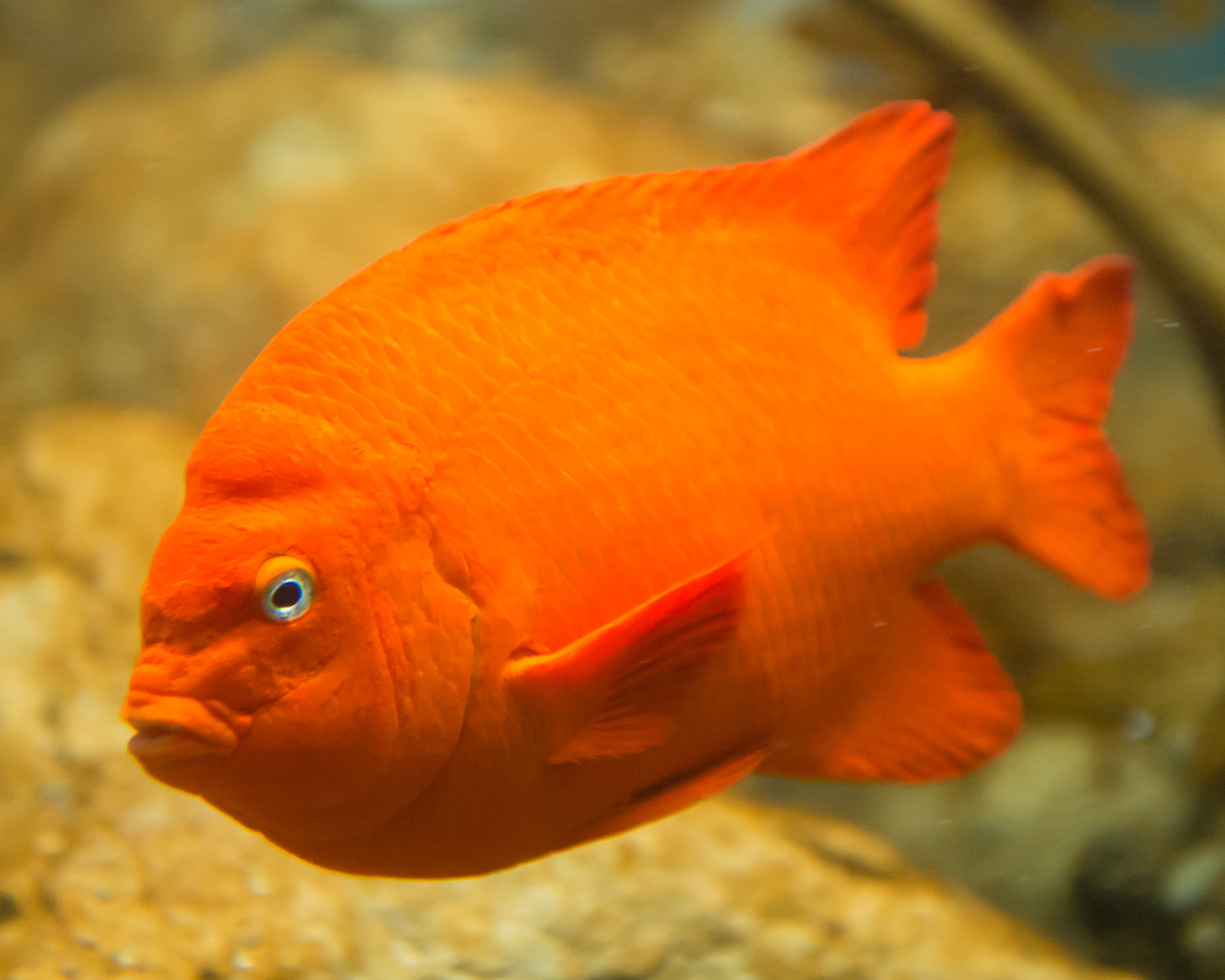
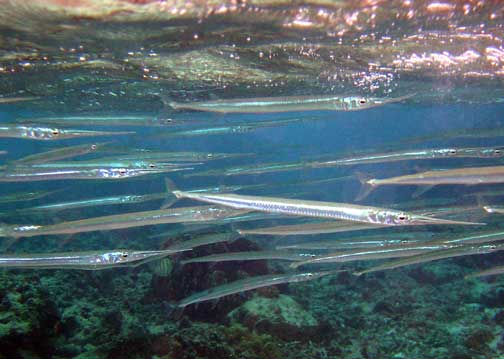
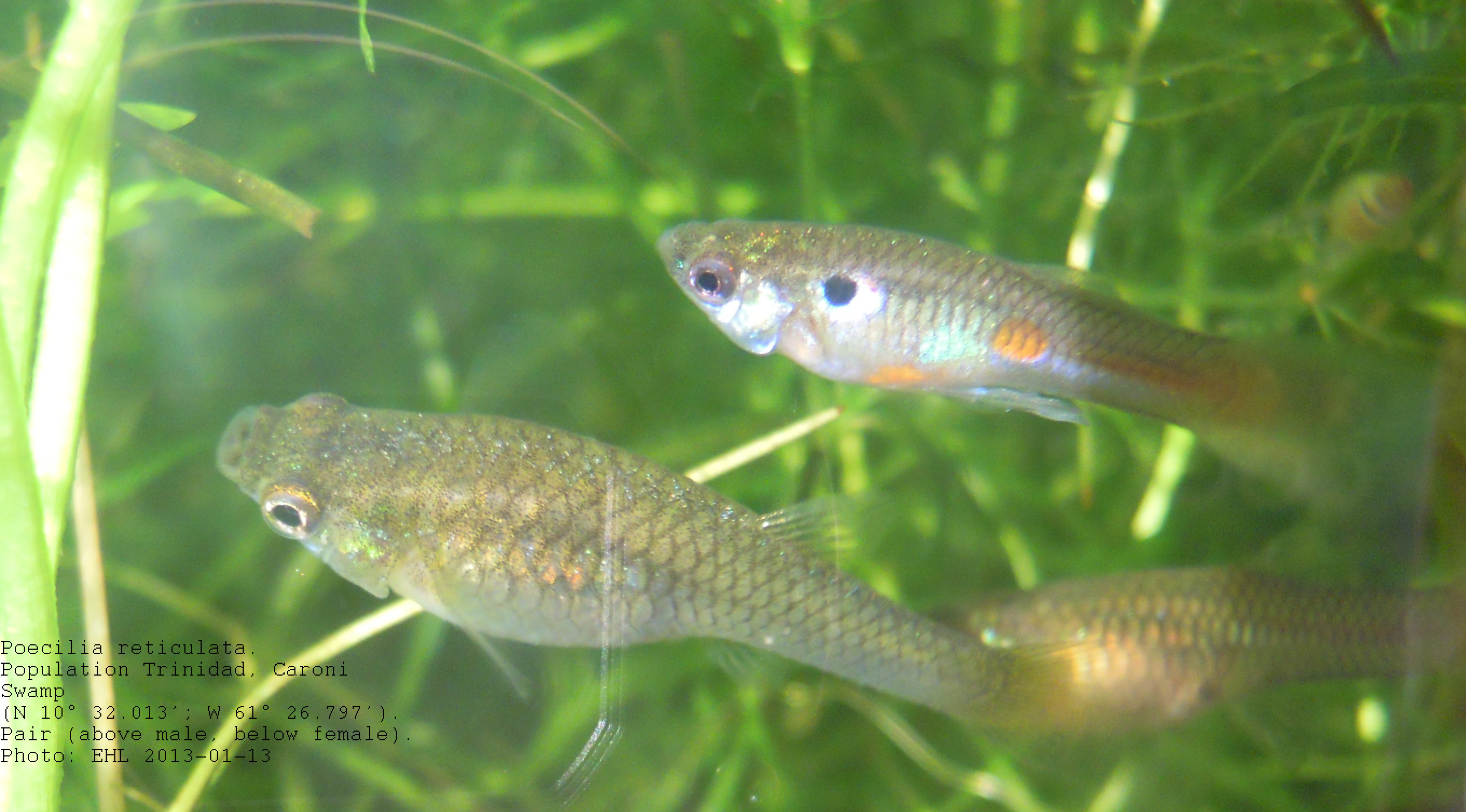
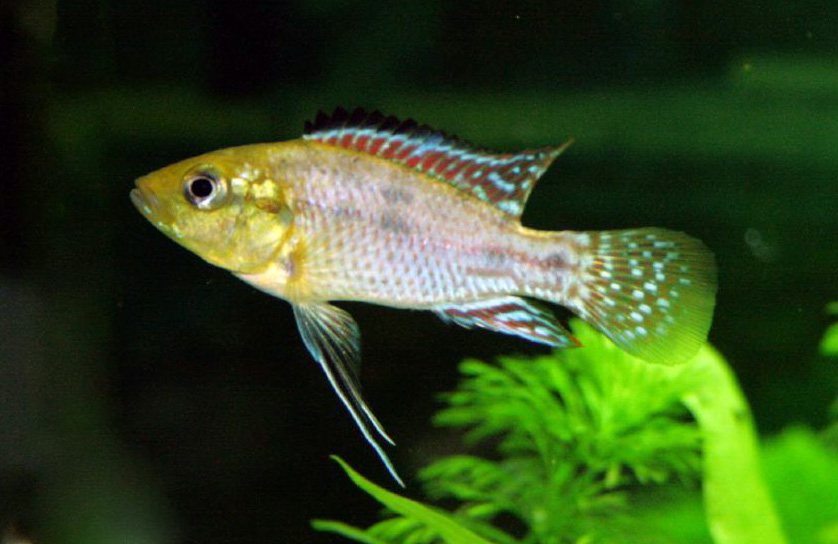
- Representatives of Ovalentaria

Scientific classification
- Kingdom: Animalia
- Phylum: Chordata
- Class: Actinopterygii
- Division: Teleostei
- Clade: Percomorpha
- Clade: Ovalentaria; W. L. Smith and T. J. Near, 2012

Orders
- Atheriniformes; Beloniformes; Cyprinodontiformes; Cichliformes; Mugiliformes; Blenniiformes

Synonyms
- Stiassnyiformes

= Ovalentaria =

Ovalentaria Temporal range: Early Paleocene–present

Clade of fishes

Ovalentaria is a clade of ray-finned fishes within the Percomorpha, referred to as a subseries. It is made up of a group of fish families which are referred to in Fishes of the World's fifth edition as incertae sedis, as well as the orders Mugiliformes, Cichliformes, and Blenniiformes. It was named by W. L. Smith and T. J. Near in Wainwright et al. (2012) based on a molecular phylogeny, but the authors suggested that the group was united by the presence of demersal eggs that are attached to a substrate. Some authors have used the ordinal name Stiassnyiformes for a clade including Mugiloidei, Plesiopidae, Blenniiformes, Atherinomorpha, and Cichlidae, and this grouping does appear to be monophyletic.

== Classification ==
Based on the Catalog of Fishes (2025), with additional clade names added when necessary:

- Subseries Ovalentaria
  - Infraseries Atherinomorpha
    - Order Atheriniformes
      - Suborder Atherinopsoidei
        - Family Atherinopsidae (New World silversides)
      - Suborder Atherinoidei
        - Family Atherinidae (Old World silversides)
        - Family Bedotiidae (Malagasy rainbowfishes)
        - Family Melanotaeniidae (rainbowfishes)
        - Family Pseudomugilidae (blue-eyes)
        - Family Telmatherinidae (sailfin silversides)
        - Family Notocheiridae (surf silversides)
        - Family Isonidae (surf sardines)
        - Family Atherionidae (pricklenose silversides)
        - Family Dentatherinidae (Mercer's tusked silverside)
        - Family Phallostethidae (priapiumfishes)
    - Order Beloniformes
      - Suborder Exocoetoidei
        - Superfamily Scomberesocoidea
          - Family Scomberesocidae (sauries)
          - Family Belonidae (needlefishes)
        - Superfamily Exocoetoidea
          - Family Hemiramphidae (Halfbeaks)
          - Family Zenarchopteridae (viviparous halfbeaks)
          - Family Exocoetidae (flying fishes)
      - Suborder Adrianichthyoidei
        - Family Adrianichthyidae (adrianichthyids or ricefishes)
    - Order Cyprinodontiformes
      - Suborder Aplocheiloidei
        - Family Aplocheilidae (Asian rivulines)
        - Family Nothobranchiidae (African rivulines)
        - Family Rivulidae (New World rivulines)
      - Suborder Cyprinodontoidei
        - Family Pantanodontidae (spine killifishes)
        - Family Fundulidae (topminnows)
        - Family Cyprinodontidae (pupfishes)
        - Family Profundulidae (Middle American killifishes)
        - Family Goodeidae (splitfins or goodeids)
        - Family Fluviphylacidae (American lampeyes)
        - Family Anablepidae (four-eyed fish)
        - Family Poecilidae (livebearers)
        - Family Aphaniidae (Oriental killifishes)
        - Family Valenciidae (Valencia toothcarps)
        - Family Procatopodidae (African lampeyes)
  - Order Cichliformes
    - Family Polycentridae (African and South American leaffishes)
    - Family Cichlidae (cichlids)
    - Family Pholidichthyidae (convict blenny)
  - Order Mugiliformes
    - Family Ambassidae (Asian glassfishes)
    - Family Mugilidae (mullets)
  - Order Blenniiformes
    - Family Pseudochromidae (dottybacks)
    - Family Plesiopidae (roundheads)
    - Family Pomacentridae (damselfishes, clownfish)
    - Family Embiotocidae (surfperches)
    - Family Grammatidae (basslets)
    - Family Opistognathidae (jawfishes)
    - Suborder Gobiesocoidei
      - Family Gobiesocidae (clingfishes)
    - Suborder Blennioidei
      - Family Tripterygiidae (triplefin blennies)
      - Family Blenniidae (combtooth blennies)
      - Family Clinidae (kelp blennies)
      - Family Labrisomidae (labrisomid blennies)
      - Family Chaenopsidae (tube blennies)
      - Family Dactyloscopidae (sand stargazers)

The sister clades to the Ovalentaria is the group of taxa called the Carangimorpharia or Carangaria, which includes the flatfishes, billfishes, and jacks among others.
