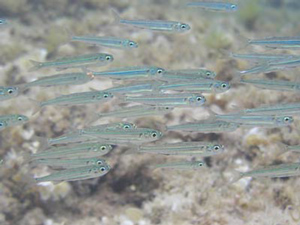
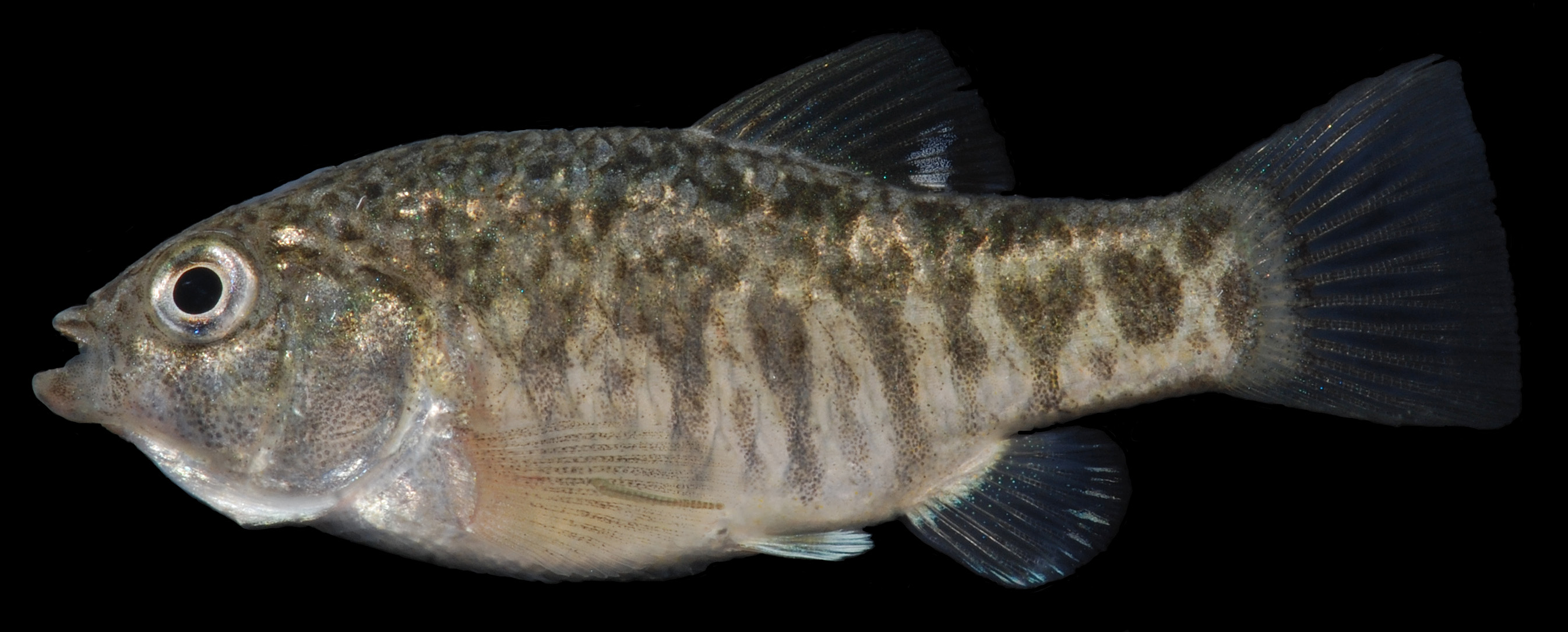
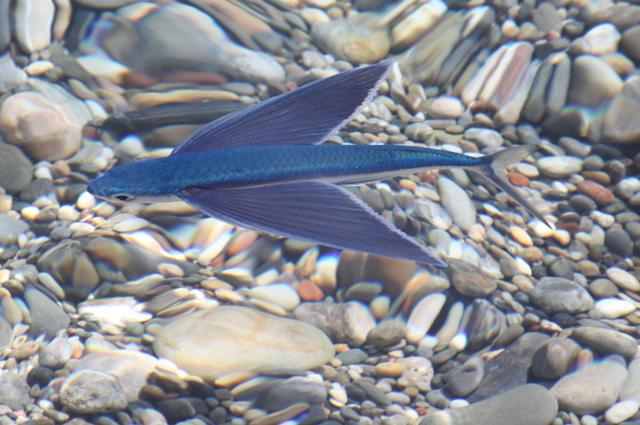

Scientific classification
- Kingdom: Animalia
- Phylum: Chordata
- Class: Actinopterygii
- Division: Teleostei
- Superorder: Acanthopterygii
- Clade: Percomorpha
- Clade: Ovalentaria
- (unranked): Atherinomorpha

= Atherinomorpha =

Clade of fishes

The Atherinomorpha is a clade of fishes in the superorder Acanthopterygii, the ray-finned fishes, consisting of three orders. The clade is ranked as an infraseries within the subseries Ovalentaria, which in turn is ranked within the wider Percomorpha clade.

== Characteristics ==
The species within the infraseries Atherinomorpha are generally small fishes which normally grow no longer than 2–10 centimetres (0.79–3.94 in), although some needlefishes from the order Beloniformes can grow as long as 1.5 metres (4.9 ft).

They may or may not have spines in their fins but where these are present they are generally weak. The number of vertebrae is normally less than 24. The pelvic fins are positioned abdominally, subabdominally, or thoracically and may be connected to the pleural rib by a ligament. Ctenoid scales may be present but this is rare within this grouping. The testes of the males are of the restricted spermatogonial type, in which the testes change to reflect a seasonal pattern of reproduction. The females lay demersal eggs with filaments on the chorion.

The majority of the species within the Atherinomorpha are surface feeding fishes, and about three quarters of the species are restricted to fresh or brackish waters (such as the rainbowfish of Melanotaeniidae and the viviparous halfbeaks of Zenarchopteridae). Within this infraseries various adaptations allowing for internal fertilisation has been independently evolved, especially in freshwater groupings, and this taxon contains a greater diversity of internal fertilization methods than any other group of fishes. Species may be oviparous or viviparous. The filaments on the chorion are used to stick to the substrate and in most taxa, other than the exocoetoids there is an obvious droplet of oil that forms at the vegetal pole.

== Taxonomy ==
There is very strong evidence that the Atherinomorpha forms a monophyletic grouping, supported by the emphasis of diverse and unusual reproductive adaptations and this has subsequently been supported by molecular studies. Within the group the Atheriniformes are a sister group to the Beloniformes and the Cyprinodontiformes, with the atherinids which have spines in their fins being regarded as the most basal members of the clade.

The fossil range of the Atherinomorpha is the Eocene to the present.

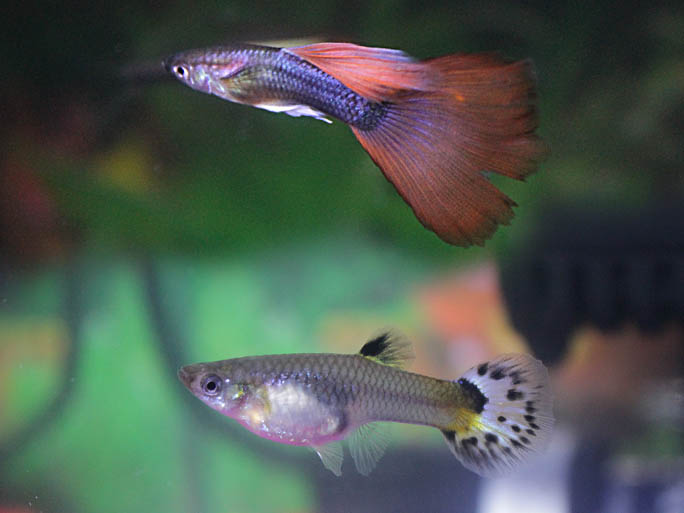
These fancy guppies (Poecilia reticulata) belong to the Cyprinodontiformes

The Atherinomorpha is classified as follows:

- Infraseries Atherinomorpha
  - Order Atheriniformes
    - Suborder Atherinopsoidei
    - Suborder Atherinoidei
  - Order Beloniformes
    - Suborder Adrianichthyoidei
    - Suborder Exocoetoidei
  - Order Cyprinodontiformes
    - Suborder Aplocheiloidei
    - Suborder Cyprinodontoidei

=== Cladograms ===
The following cladogram is based on the time-calibrated phylogenetic study by Betancur-R and colleagues (2017):

- Atherinimorpha
  - Beloniformes
    - Adrianichthyoidei
      Adrianichthyidae (ricefishes)
    - Belonoidei (needlefishes) (=Exocoetoidei)
      - - Zenarchopteridae (paraphyletic sensu Betancur-R et al.)
        - Belonidae
      - - Hemiramphidae (halfbeaks)
        - Exocoetidae (flying fish)
  - - Cyprinodontiformes
      - Aplocheiloidei
        Aplocheilidae (Asian killifishes)
      - Cyprinodontoidei
        - Poeciliidae (live bearers, including many aquarium fish)
        - - Cyprinodontidae (pupfishes)
          - Fundulidae
    - Atheriniformes
      - Atherinopsoidei
        Atherinopsidae (Neotropical silversides)
      - Atherinoidei
        - Isonidae
        - - Bedotiidae
          - - Atherinidae
            - - - Telmatherinidae
                - - Phallostethidae
                  - Pseudomugilidae
              - Melanotaeniidae (rainbowfishes)

An alternate arrangement was recovered using a maximum likelihood phylogenetic tree by Setiamarga (2017):

- Atherinimorpha
  - Atheriniformes
    - Atherinopsidae
    - Atherinoidei
      - - Atherinidae
        - Notocheiridae
      - Melanotaeniidae
  - Cyprinodontea
    - Beloniformes
    - Cyprinodontiformes
