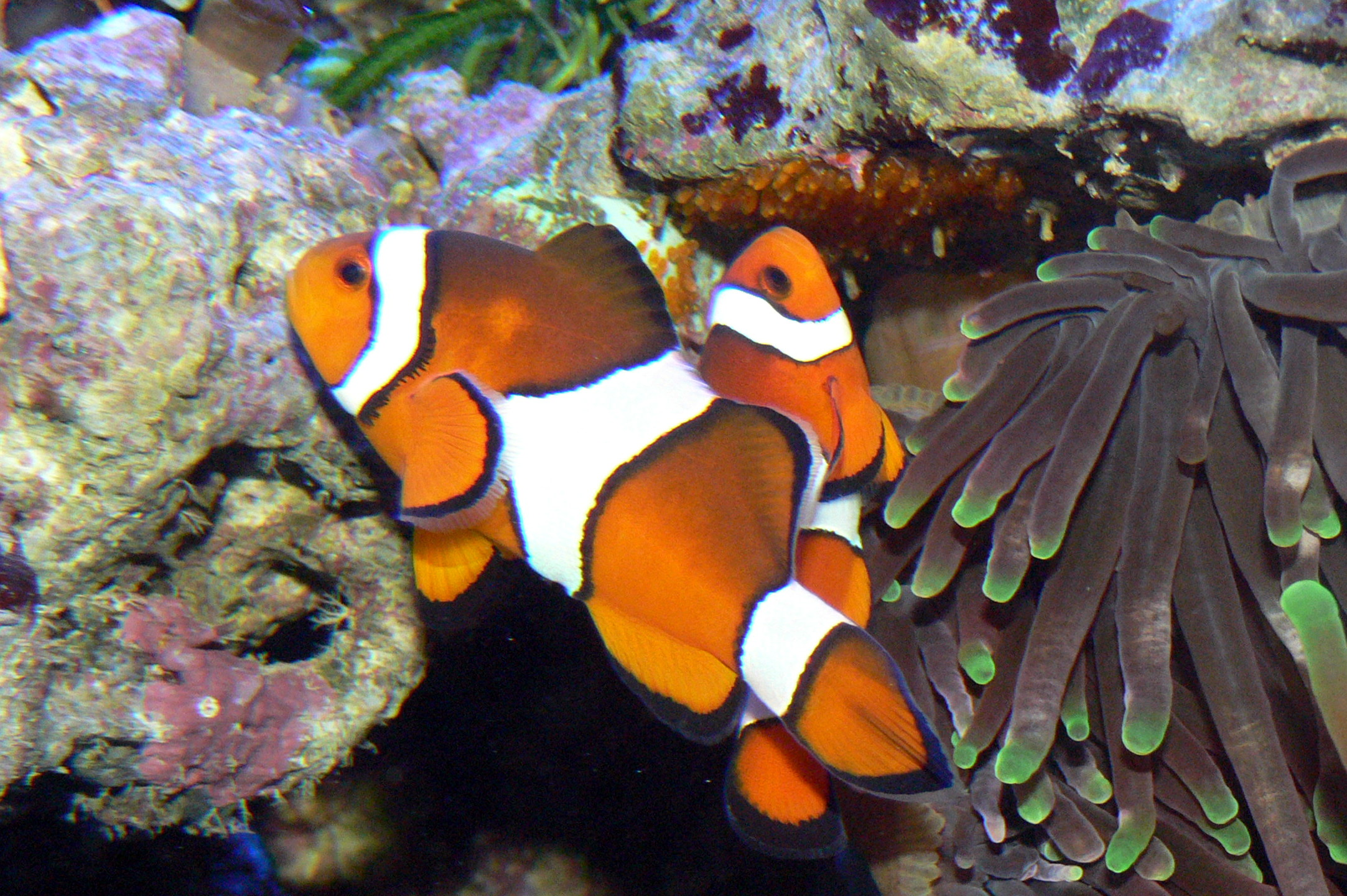
- Orange clownfish (Amphiprion percula)

Scientific classification
- Kingdom: Animalia
- Phylum: Chordata
- Class: Actinopterygii
- Superorder: Acanthopterygii
- Order: Stiassnyiformes

= Stiassnyiformes =

Order of fishes

Stiassnyiformes is an order of bony fish (Teleostei) proposed in 2009. It includes the mullets (Mugilidae), the Atheriniformes, the Beloniformes, the Cyprinodontiformes and some families of the paraphyletic Perciformes, including the cichlids. The new taxon was named by the authors of the first description in honor of the curator of the Department of Ichthyology at the American Museum of Natural History Melanie Stiassny, which suggested in 1993 that the mullet are allied with damselfish and guppies.

The close relationship of these outwardly different groups is based on molecular studies and is not supported by morphological characteristics.

- Stiassnyiformes
  - - - Mugilidae
      - Plesiopidae, Dottybacks and allies
    - - Gobiesocidae
      - Blennioidei
  - - - Cichlidae
      - - Pomacentridae
        - Embiotocidae
    - - Cyprinodontiformes
      - - Cyprinodontiformes
        - Beloniformes

The 5th edition of Fishes of the World classifies the families which make up the Stiassnyiformes within the subseries Ovalentaria.
