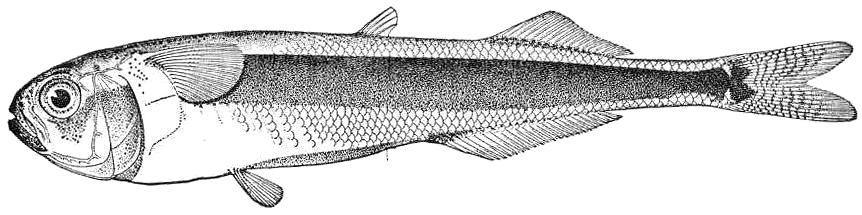
- Iso flosmaris

Scientific classification
- Kingdom: Animalia
- Phylum: Chordata
- Class: Actinopterygii
- (unranked): Atherinomorpha
- Order: Atheriniformes
- Suborder: Atherinoidei
- Family: Isonidae; Rosen, 1964
- Genus: Iso; D. S. Jordan & Starks, 1901

Type species
- Iso flosmaris D.S. Jordan & Starks, 1901

= Iso (fish) =

Genus of fishes

Iso is an Indo-Pacific genus of silversides, commonly called surf sardines, the only genus in the monogeneric family Isonidae, they were formerly classified in the family Notocheiridae alongside the surf silverside but they are now thought to be within the suborder Atherinoidei while the surf silverside is classified in the suborder Atherinopsoidei, along with the Neotropical silversides. It contains five species to date, the first of which was described in 1895.

== Species ==
The currently recognized species in this genus are:

- Iso flosmaris D. S. Jordan & Starks, 1901
- Iso hawaiiensis Gosline, 1952 (Hawaiian surf sardine)
- Iso natalensis Regan, 1919 (surf sprite)
- Iso nesiotes Saeed, Ivantsoff & Crowley, 1993 (Samoan surf sardine)
- Iso rhothophilus (J. D. Ogilby, 1895) (flower of the wave)
