= Pricklenose silverside =

Scientific classification
- Kingdom: Animalia
- Phylum: Chordata
- Class: Actinopterygii
- Order: Atheriniformes
- Family: Atherionidae
- Genus: Atherion
- Species: A. africanum

Binomial name
- Atherion africanum J. L. B. Smith, 1965

Species of fish

The pricklenose silverside (Atherion africanum) is a species of silverside from the family Atherionidae. It is found in the western Indian Ocean from India to KwaZulu Natal in South Africa. It is a prey species for many commercially caught larger fish and may be used as bait by fishermen, usually caught at depths of less than 2 metres (6.6 ft). This species was described in 1965 by James Leonard Brierley Smith from a type locality of Inhaca Island, Mozambique. It is distinguished from similar species of silverside within its range by the rough, shagreen-like skin around its snout.
