= McCulloch's hardyhead =

Scientific classification
- Kingdom: Animalia
- Phylum: Chordata
- Class: Actinopterygii
- Order: Atheriniformes
- Family: Atherionidae
- Genus: Atherion
- Species: A. maccullochi

Binomial name
- Atherion maccullochi Jordan & Hubbs, 1919

Species of fish

McCulloch's hardyhead (Atherion maccullochi) is a species of silverside from the family Atherionidae. This species occurs off the coasts of Australia. It was described by David Starr Jordan and Carl Leavitt Hubbs in 1919 from a type locality of Lord Howe Island and the specific name honours the Australian ichthyologist Allan Riverstone McCulloch (1885-1925), who was Curator of Fishes at the Australian Museum and who provided Jordan and Hubbs with the type.
