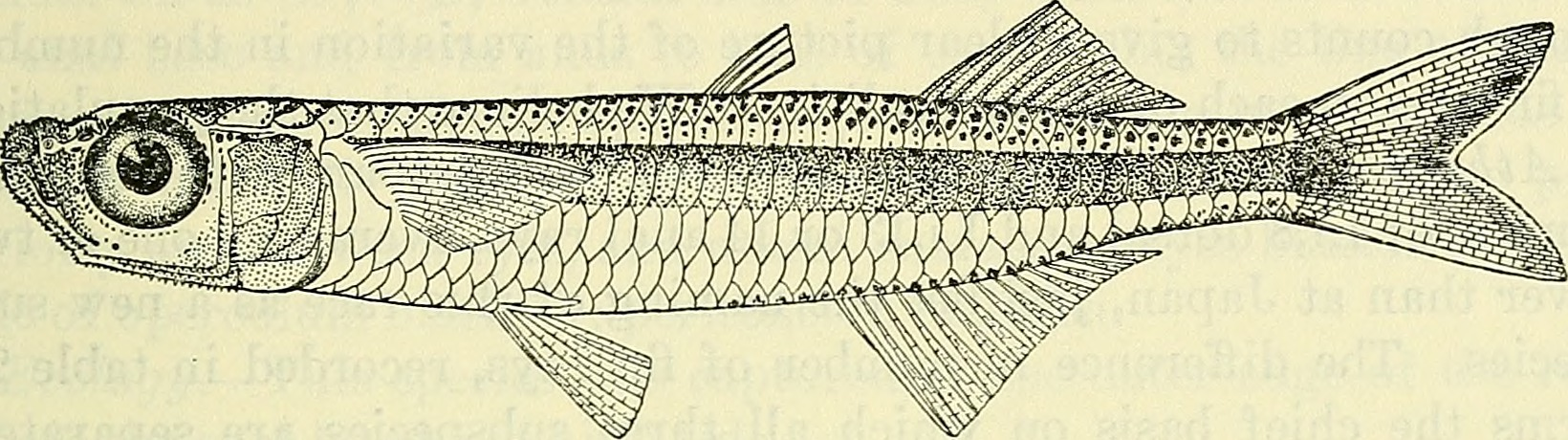

Conservation status
- Least Concern (IUCN 3.1)

Scientific classification
- Kingdom: Animalia
- Phylum: Chordata
- Class: Actinopterygii
- Order: Atheriniformes
- Family: Atherionidae
- Genus: Atherion
- Species: A. elymus

Binomial name
- Atherion elymus D.S. Jordan & Starks, 1901

= Atherion elymus =

Species of fish

Atherion elymus, the bearded silverside or pickleface hardyhead, is a species of silverside from the family Atherionidae. It is found in the western Pacific Ocean.

== Description ==
Atherion elymus has an elongated, compressed body with a small mouth in which the upper jaw does not extend as far as the front edge of the eye. The head has a number of rows of denticles or small spines. Its anus sits immediately in front of the origin of the anal fin. The colouration is greenish gray on the back and whitish on the underside with a wide silvery band along the flanks which extends to the caudal fin. Small dark or black spots are normally scattered along the lower part of the flanks. They grow to a maximum standard length of around 7 centimetres (2.8 in).

== Distribution ==
Atherion elymus occurs in the western Pacific Ocean from Japan in the north south to northern Queensland and east as far as Fiji.

== Habitat and biology ==
Atherion elymus is a species of shallow water and is associated with reefs, large aggregations can be found in tidal pools, along rocky coastlines and along the edges of reefs. It lays large eggs which adhere to the substrate by a sticky filament.

== Taxonomy ==
This species was described by David Starr Jordan and Edwin Chapin Starks in 1901 from a type locality of Misaki in the Kanagawa Prefecture in the coast of the Sagami Sea in Japan. Jordan and Starks gave it the specific name elymus as the rough denticles around its mouth bear a resemblance to the seed heads of the rye grasses of the genus Elymus. It is the type species of the genus Atherion.
