= Palaeoatherina =

Scientific classification
- Kingdom: Animalia
- Phylum: Chordata
- Class: Actinopterygii
- Order: Atheriniformes
- Genus: †Palaeoatherina; Ferrandini & Gaudant, 1977

Extinct genus of fishes

Palaeoatherina is an extinct genus of prehistoric bony fish.

== See also ==
- Prehistoric fish
- List of prehistoric bony fish
