= Pranesus =

Scientific classification
- Kingdom: Animalia
- Phylum: Chordata
- Class: Actinopterygii
- Order: Atheriniformes
- Genus: †Pranesus; Whitley, 1930

Extinct genus of fishes

Pranesus is an extinct genus of prehistoric bony fish.

== See also ==
- Prehistoric fish
- List of prehistoric bony fish
