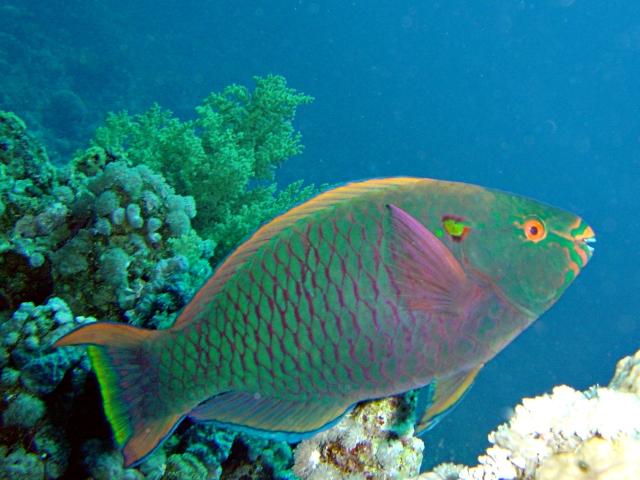

Conservation status
- Least Concern (IUCN 3.1)

Scientific classification
- Kingdom: Animalia
- Phylum: Chordata
- Class: Actinopterygii
- Order: Labriformes
- Family: Labridae
- Genus: Scarus
- Species: S. niger

Binomial name
- Scarus niger Forsskål, 1775
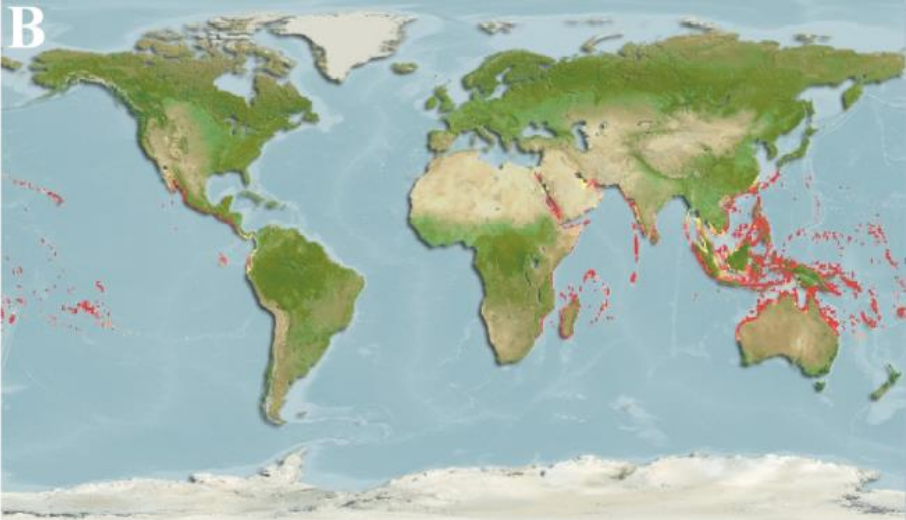
- Distribution

Synonyms
- List: Callyodon niger (Forsskål, 1775); Scarus chadri Lacépède, 1802; Scarus nuchipunctatus Valenciennes, 1840; Callyodon nuchipunctatus (Valenciennes, 1840); Scarus limbatus Valenciennes, 1840; Scarus makaravar Montrouzier, 1857; Pseudoscarus flavomarginatus Kner, 1865; Pseudoscarus madagascariensis Steindachner, 1887; Callyodon madagascariensis (Steindachner, 1887); Callyodon maoricus Jordan & Seale, 1906; Pseudoscarus godeffroyi Günther, 1909; Callyodon lineolabiatus Fowler & Bean, 1928; Scarus lineolabiatus (Fowler & Bean, 1928)

= Scarus niger =

Species of fish

Scarus niger, common names the swarthy parrotfish, dusky parrotfish, and black parrotfish, is a species of parrotfish. It is found in Indo-West and Central Pacific, from the Red Sea, north to Japan,parts of Southeast Asia, south to Australia and east to French Polynesia. It is found in lagoons, channels and outer reefs slopes on the depths of 2 to 20 metres (6 ft 7 in to 65 ft 7 in).

== Biology ==
The dusky parrotfish often lives in solitude, but males may also live in a small group of mating females. This species is very small for a parrotfish. It is known to reach at least 252 mm in length, and weighs up to at least 282 g.

=== Reproduction ===
The dusky parrotfish is a protogynous hermaphrodite.The dominant female in a group with only females may turn into a male; such males are called secondary males. Male and female fish form pair during breeding. After breeding, the gonads drastically reduce in size.

=== Feeding behavior ===
The dusky parrotfish feeds primarily on benthic algae growing on hard substrates and dead coral. Unlike some larger parrotfish species, it typically does not feed on live coral. This small parrotfish species has a very high feeding rate compared to other parrotfish species, biting more times in a given period of time. Nonetheless, its small bite volume means it contributes far less bio-erosion compared larger parrotfish species. It does not follow any set feeding pattern, but it tends to feed more in the morning and afternoon rather than at midday and sundown.

Denser coral patches that provide more cover for the fish leads to a decrease in the foraging range, as well as denser populations. In comparison with other species of parrotfishes, the dusky parrotfish tends to be less aggressive to other parrotfish species and will decrease its foraging range when it is in an environment with a high parrotfish density. As a result, in such environments, other parrotfish species compete with S. niger instead of offering benefits from group foraging, such as reductions in predation risks.

== Gallery ==
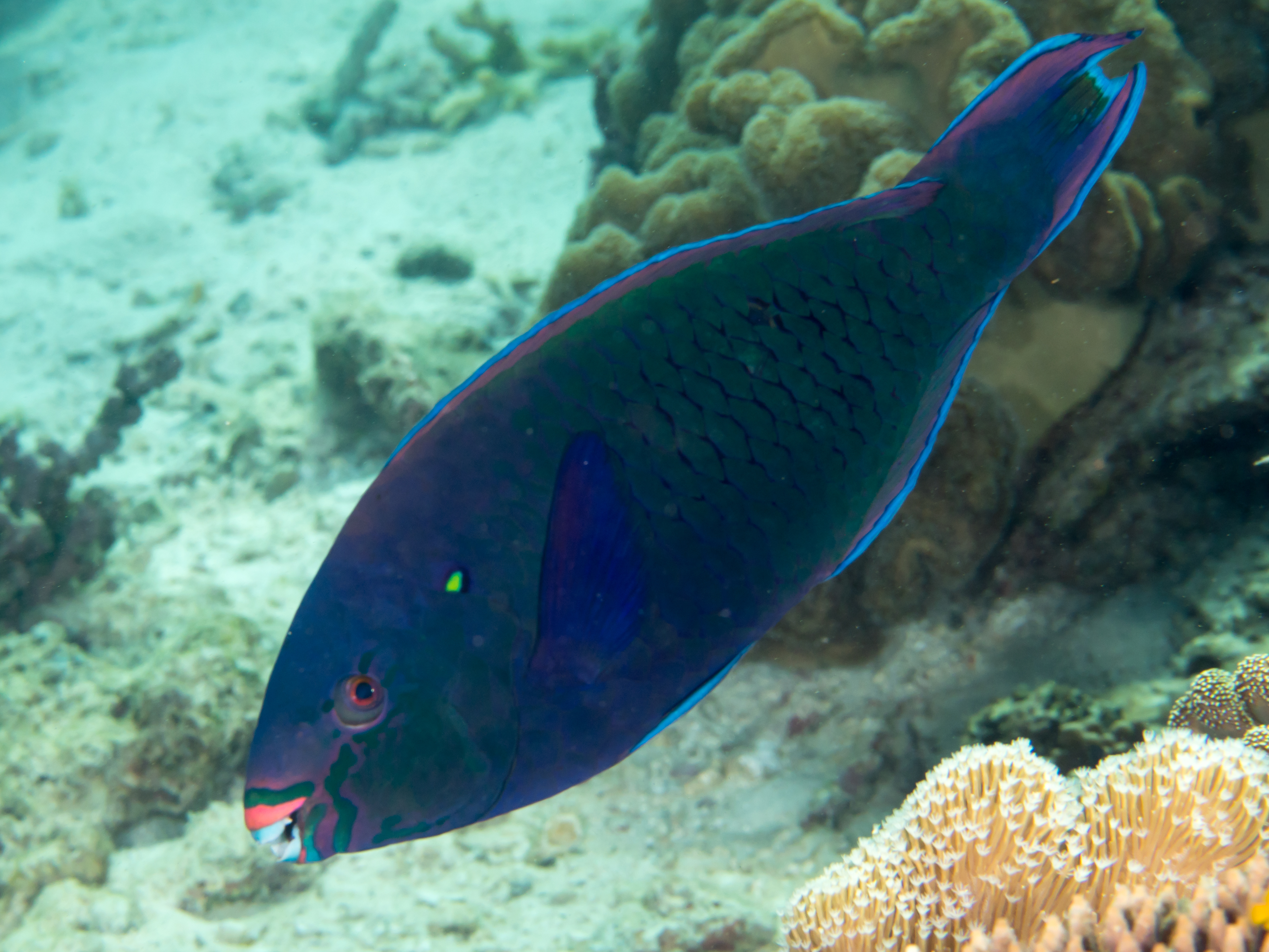

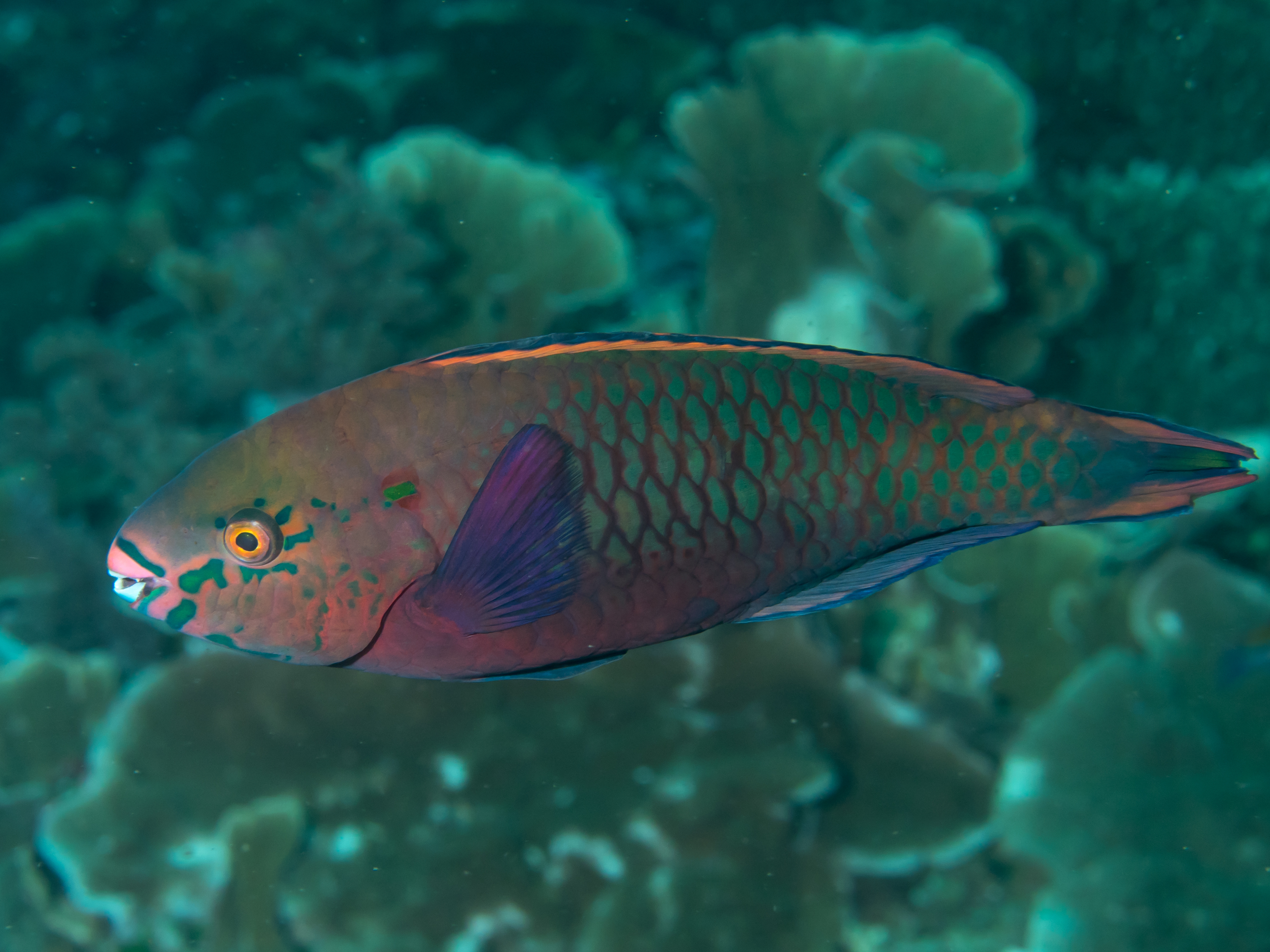

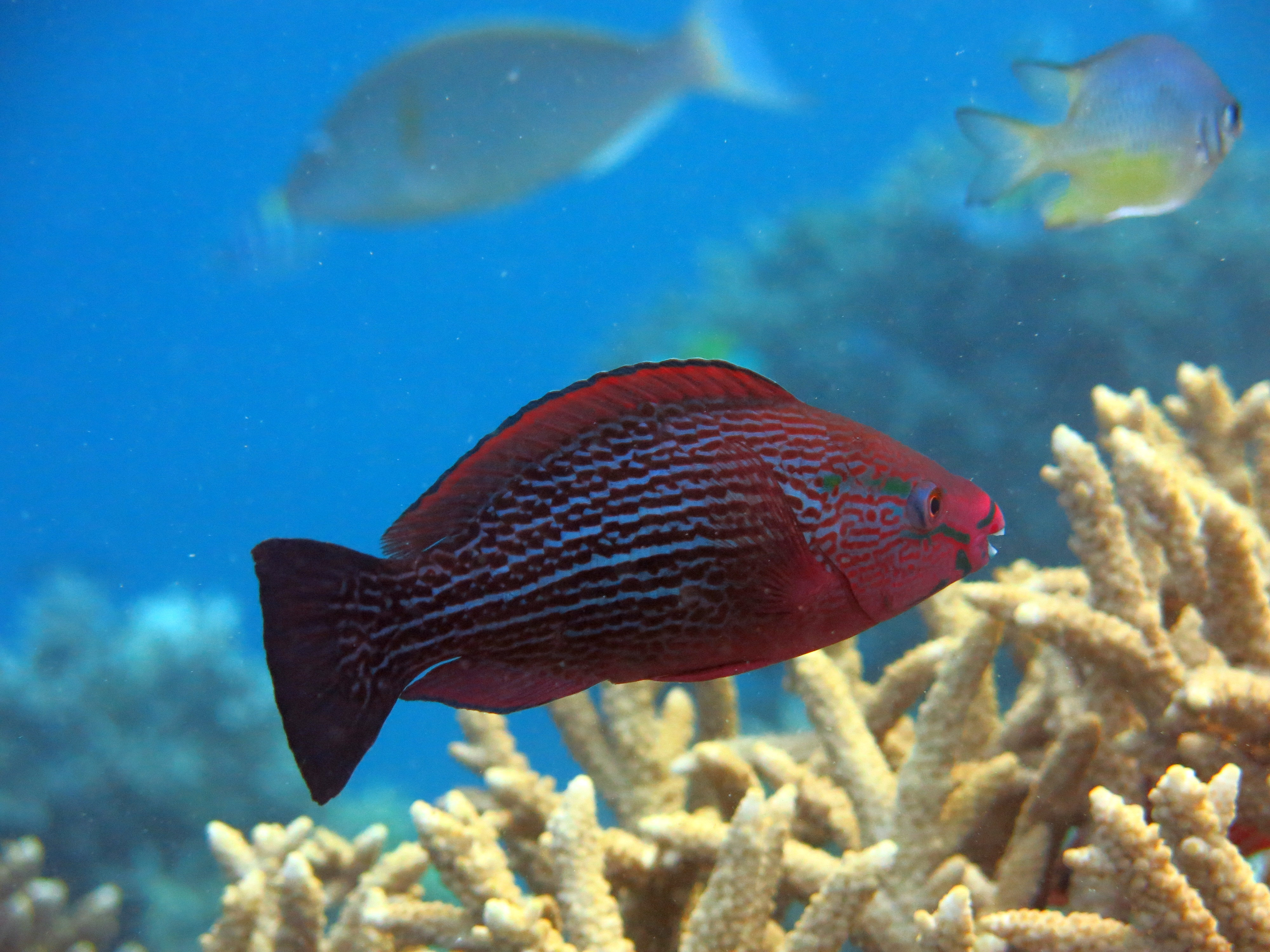

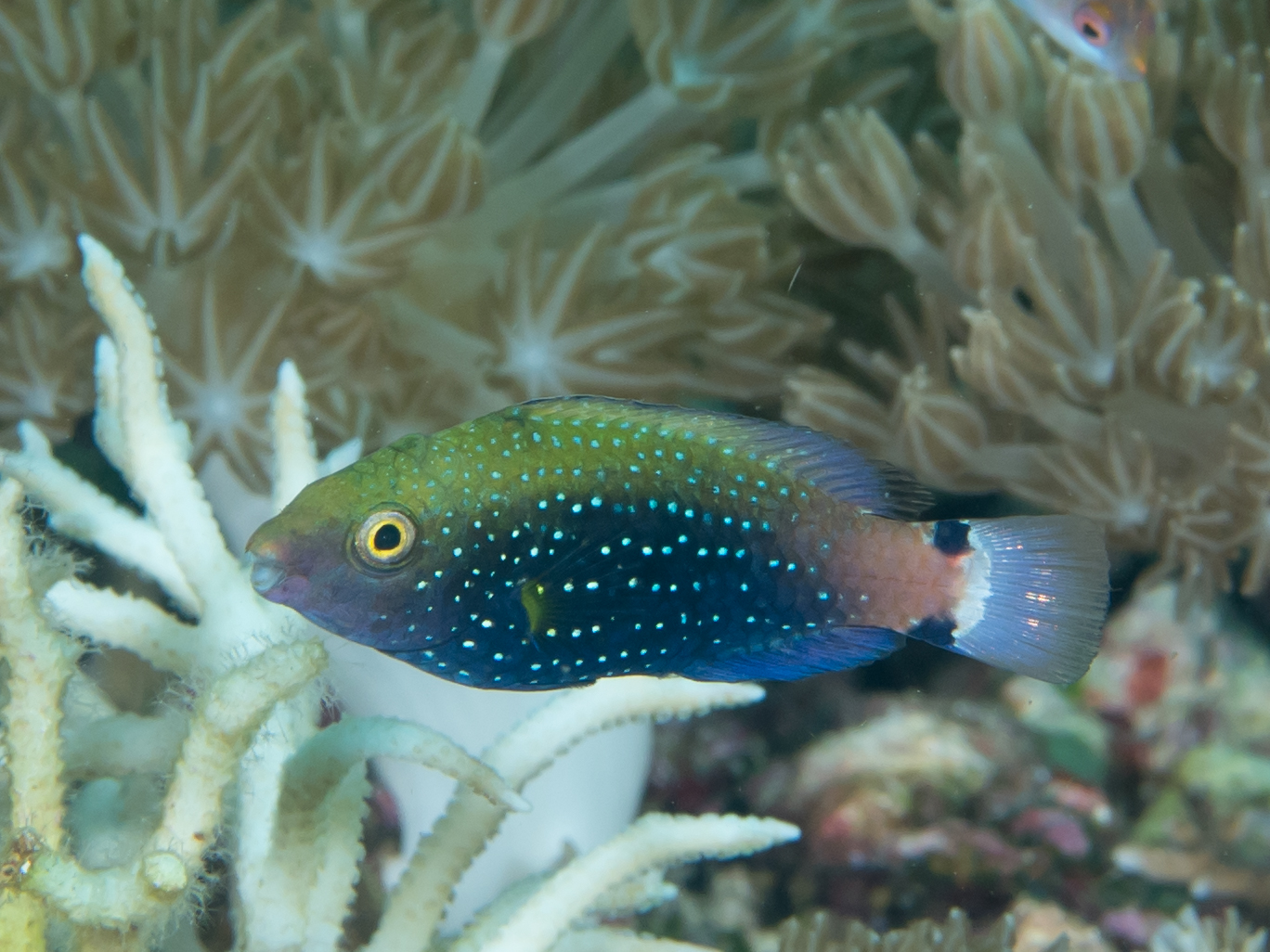
