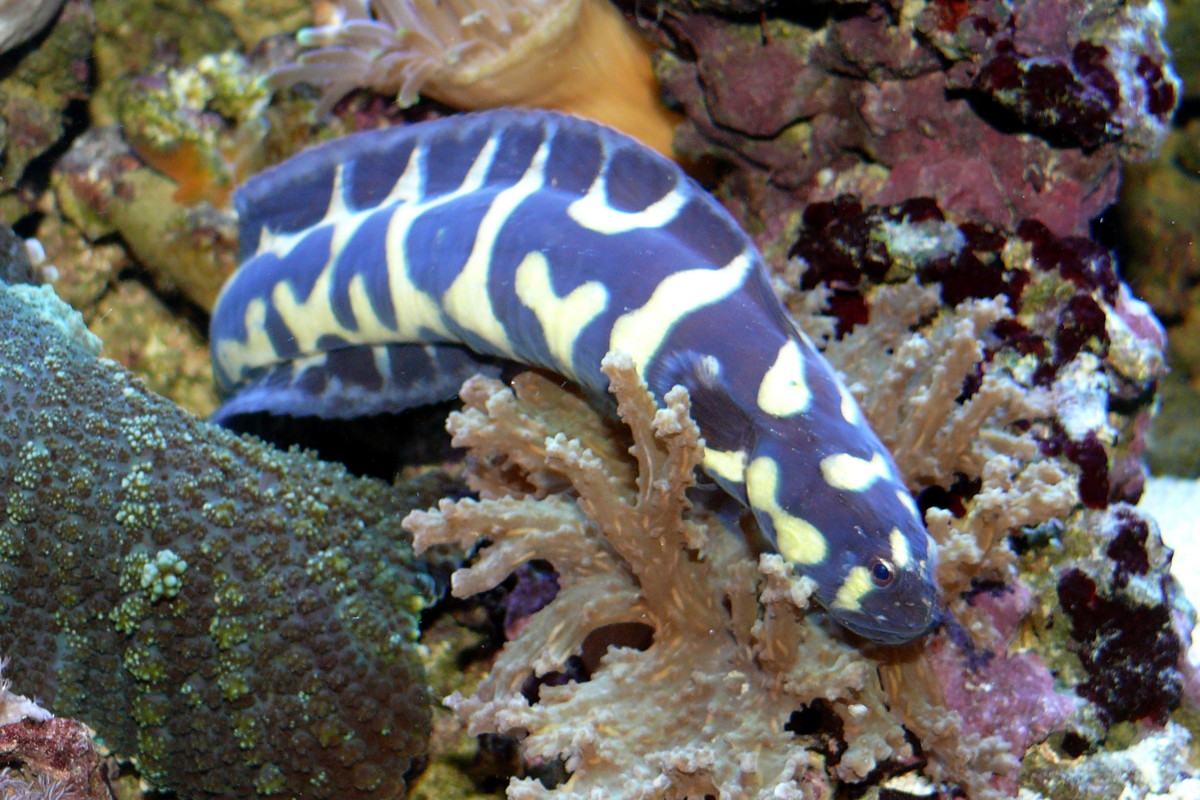
- Pholidichthys leucotaenia, the convict blenny
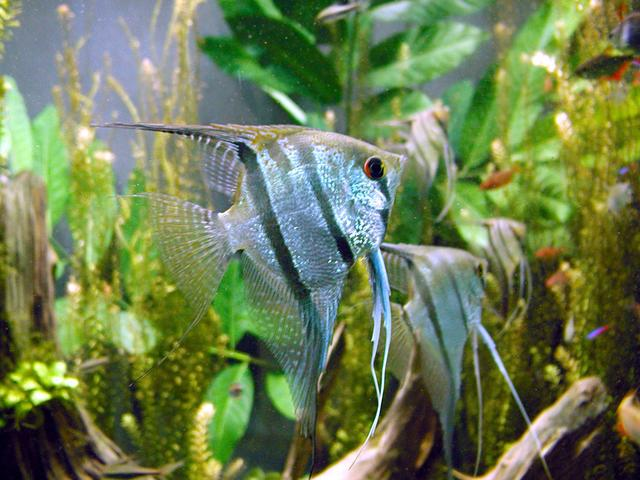
- Pterophyllum scalare, the freshwater angelfish, a cichlid

Scientific classification
- Kingdom: Animalia
- Phylum: Chordata
- Class: Actinopterygii
- Division: Teleostei
- Clade: Ovalentaria
- Order: Cichliformes; Betancur-R. et al. 2013

Type species
- Cichla ocellaris Bloch & Schneider, 1801

Families
- Polycentridae; Pholidichthyidae; Cichlidae

= Cichliformes =

Cichliformes Temporal range: Middle Eocene to present

Order of fishes

Cichliformes /ˈsɪklɪfɔːrmiːz/ is an order of ray-finned fish. Its members were previously classified under the order Perciformes, but now many authorities consider it to be an independent order within the subseries Ovalentaria. The earliest fossils are known from the Eocene.

== Taxonomy ==
According to the Catalog of Fishes (2025), the following three families are contained in the order:

- Polycentridae T. N. Gill, 1858 (leaffishes)
- Pholidichthyidae D.S. Jordan, 1896 (convict blennies)
- Cichlidae Bonaparte, 1835 (cichlids)

Among the three families, the leaffishes are a small family consisting of four genera and five species, the convict blennies are a small family consisting of a single genus and two species, and the cichlids are one of the largest vertebrate families with over 202 genera and more than 1700 described species. These families look physically dissimilar from one another, with only molecular data revealing their close relationships.
