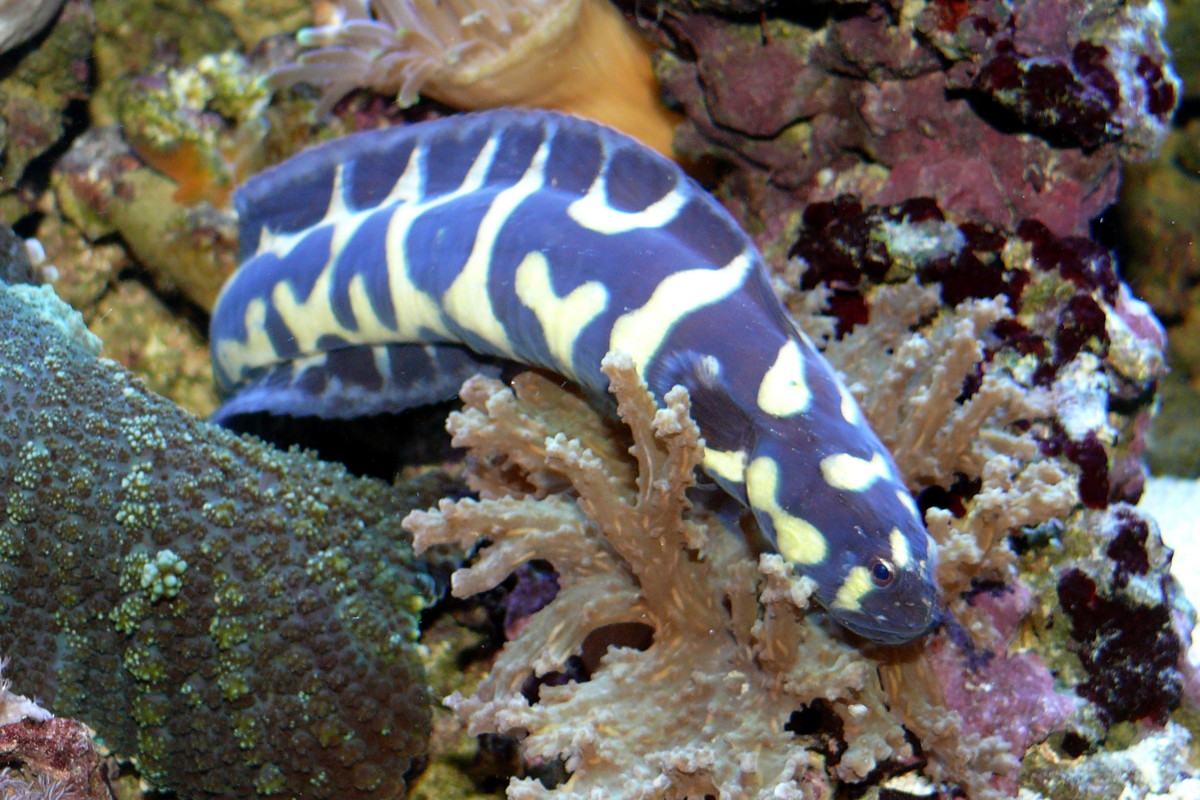
- Pholidichthys leucotaenia

Scientific classification
- Kingdom: Animalia
- Phylum: Chordata
- Class: Actinopterygii
- Order: Cichliformes
- Family: Pholidichthyidae; D.S. Jordan, 1896
- Genus: Pholidichthys; Bleeker, 1856

Type species
- Pholidichthys leucotaenia Bleeker, 1856

= Pholidichthys =

Genus of fishes

Pholidichthys is a genus of ray-finned fish which consists of two species found in the tropical Pacific Ocean. It is the only genus in the family Pholidichthyidae, one of two families in the order Cichliformes.

== Species ==
The following two species are found within this genus and family:

- Pholidichthys anguis Springer & Larson, 1996
- Pholidichthys leucotaenia Bleeker, 1856
