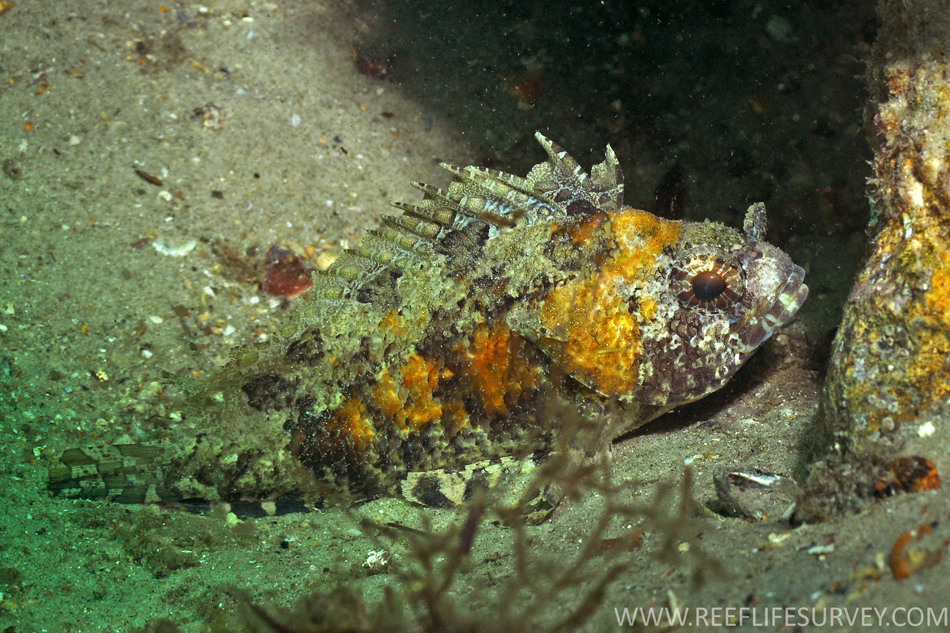

Scientific classification
- Kingdom: Animalia
- Phylum: Chordata
- Class: Actinopterygii
- Order: Labriformes
- Suborder: Labroidei
- Family: Centrogenyidae; Fowler, 1907
- Genus: Centrogenys; J. Richardson, 1842
- Species: C. vaigiensis

Binomial name
- Centrogenys vaigiensis (Quoy & Gaimard, 1824)

Synonyms
- Scorpaena vaigiensis Quoy & Gaimard, 1824

= False scorpionfish =

Species of ray-finned fish

The false scorpionfish (Centrogenys vaigiensis), also known as prettyfins, is a species of ray-finned fish, one of three species in the genus Centrogenys, which is the only genus in the family Centrogenyidae. They are pale grey or brown and usually grow no longer than 25 cm (9.8 in). False scorpionfish are distributed throughout the Indo-West Pacific, bounded by the Ryukyu Islands of Japan to the north and Australia to the south, the Nicobar Islands to the west and New Guinea to the east.

== Description ==
False scorpionfishes can grow to a maximum length of 25 cm (9.8 in), but are usually no longer than 9.3 cm (3.7 in). The operculum (bony covering of gills) has two spines, the lower of which is more conspicuous. False scorpionfish have 36 to 44 lateral line scales.

False scorpionfishes have 13 or 14 dorsal fin spines and 9 to 11 branched dorsal rays. The base of the anal fin is short, and has three spines and five segmented rays. The second anal fin spine is the longest. The pectoral fins have 12 to 14 rays, whereas pelvic fins have one spine and three rays. A membrane connects the inner pelvic ray to the body.

The body overall is pale brown or grey. The fins may be the same colour or lighter, or even clear. The ventral side is paler than the dorsal side, and large brown or grey spots mottle the pectoral and pelvic fins and also the forward portion of the anal fin. False scorpionfish feed upon small fishes, shrimps, and crabs.

=== Mimicry ===
The false scorpionfish appears very similar to the true scorpionfish, to the point of originally being described as a species of Scorpaena. This similarity protects the false scorpionfish from predators, which would not prey upon the very venomous true scorpionfish.

== Distribution and habitat ==
They are brackish-water or marine fish, living in the benthopelagic layer. Their range encompasses the Indo-West Pacific, from the Nicobar Islands to New Guinea, southwards to northern Australia, and as far north as the Ryukyu Islands of Japan. False scorpionfish occur on rocky bottoms and reefs, almost always those with ample seagrass covering. They are most commonly found in shallow waters along the coast.

== Relationship to humans ==
False scorpionfishes have little or no role in commercial fisheries. However, they are occasionally found in home aquaria.
