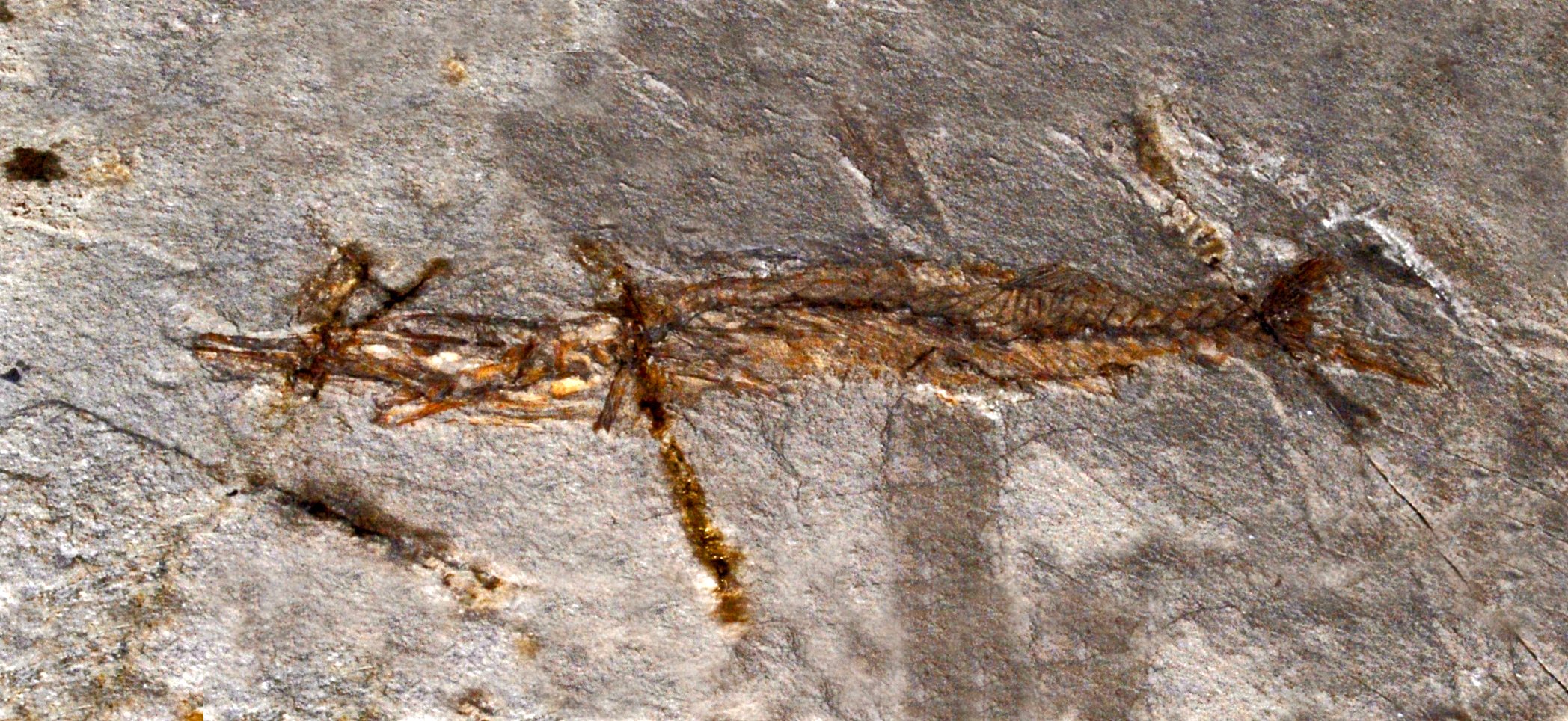
- Fossil of Rhamphognathus paralepoides from Monte Bolca

Scientific classification
- Kingdom: Animalia
- Phylum: Chordata
- Class: Actinopterygii
- Genus: †Rhamphognathus; Agassiz, 1835

= Rhamphognathus =

Rhamphognathus Temporal range: Early- Middle Eocene

Extinct genus of fishes

Rhamphognathus is an extinct genus of prehistoric bony fish that lived from the early to middle Eocene.

== Description ==
These fishes have the jaws produced and the snout ends in an acute point.

== Species ==
- Rhamphognathus paralepoides Agassiz 1835

== See also ==
- Prehistoric fish
- List of prehistoric bony fish
