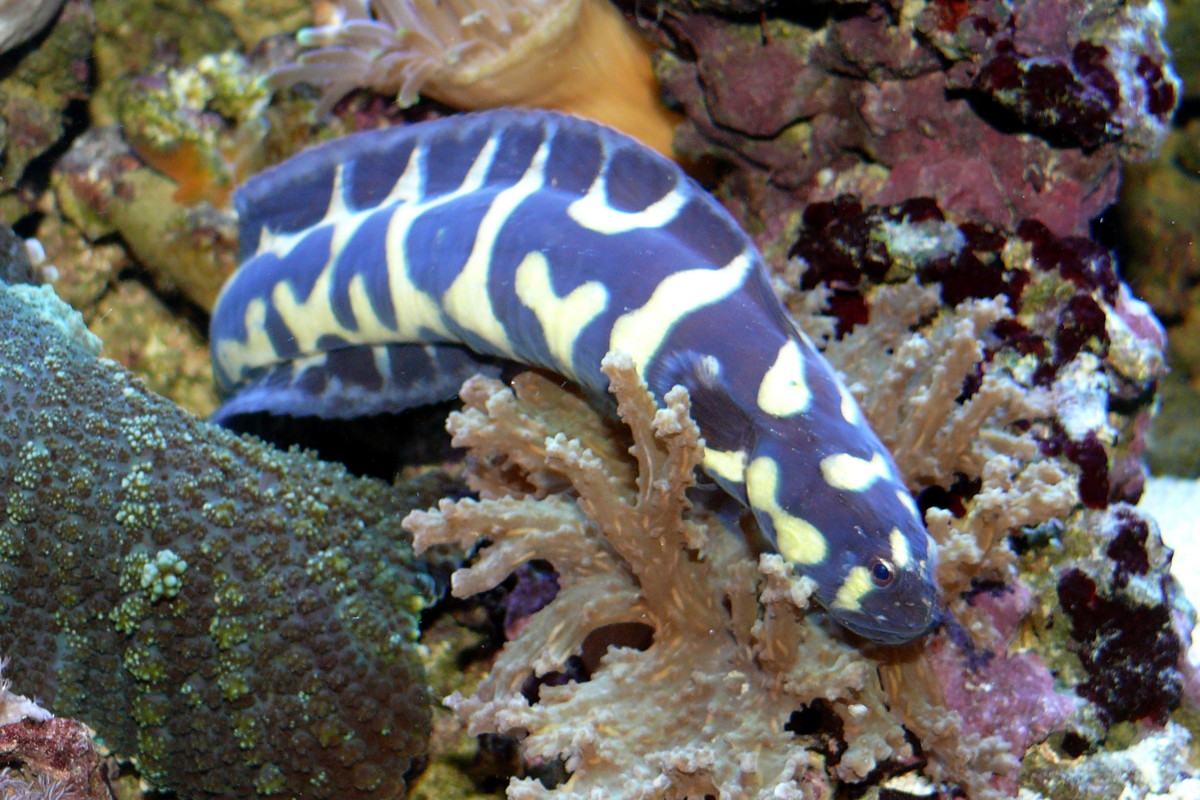

Conservation status
- Least Concern (IUCN 3.1)

Scientific classification
- Kingdom: Animalia
- Phylum: Chordata
- Class: Actinopterygii
- Division: Teleostei
- Order: Cichliformes
- Family: Pholidichthyidae
- Genus: Pholidichthys
- Species: P. leucotaenia

Binomial name
- Pholidichthys leucotaenia Bleeker, 1856

Synonyms
- Brotulophis argentistriatus Kaup, 1858

= Pholidichthys leucotaenia =

Species of fish

Pholidichthys leucotaenia, commonly known as the convict blenny or engineer goby, is a marine fish from the west-central Pacific Ocean. Despite its common names, it is neither a blenny nor a goby, but is in fact one of two species in the family Pholidichthyidae.

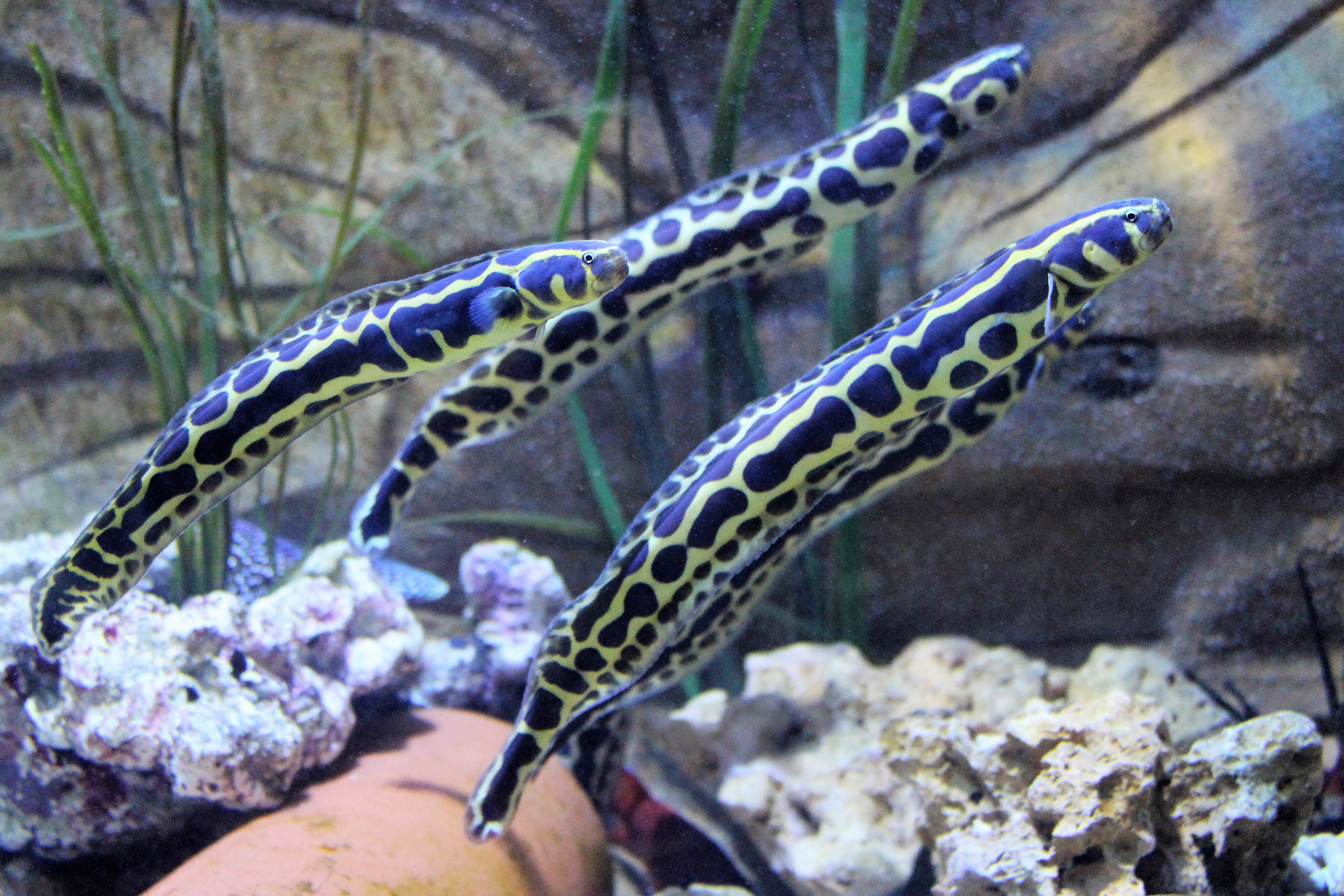
In an aquarium

Pholidichthys leucotaenia in a tank

== Description ==
A small eel-shaped fish, it can grow up to 34 cm (13 in) in length. Juveniles resemble the striped catfish Plotosus lineatus, which is venomous, having a black body with a white dorsal stripe. As they develop, the stripe changes to white convict-style barring or spotting in the adult.

== Ecology ==
P. leucotaenia lives in shallow lagoons and on coastal reefs from the Philippines to the Solomon Islands. It is often found in schools under ledges or around coral heads. These schools swim in such tight formations, they resemble a single organism. Occasionally, the species is found in the aquarium trade, where it is known for disrupting all but the most stable structures.

DNA analyses show this species to be neither a blenny nor a goby, but part of a separate fish family, the Pholidichthyidae.

In the Solomon Islands, researchers under Eugenie Clark found juveniles emerging from holes in the seafloor and adjoining coral reefs. By day, these juveniles swim up to 165 feet (50 m) from their home burrows to feed on plankton. At the end of the day, all returned to the burrows, remarkable and unique behaviour for larval fish.

Over the course of the first year in captivity, the fry will gradually change color as it grows up to 1 cm (0.5 in) per month.

While their young are out feeding, the parents eject mouthfuls of debris from the burrows. In a single day as much as 3 kg (6.6 lb) of sand might be collected and spat out of the hole by the parents. Research has revealed a maze of tunnels and chambers totaling a length of some 20 ft (6 m). At night, young fish dangle by their mouths from the roof of the tunnels by thin mucous threads.

Adults may grow to almost 34 centimetres (13 in), but never leave the tunnels to feed. They frequently take in mouthfuls of juveniles and spit them out again. An inspection of adult stomachs showed only a green slime.
