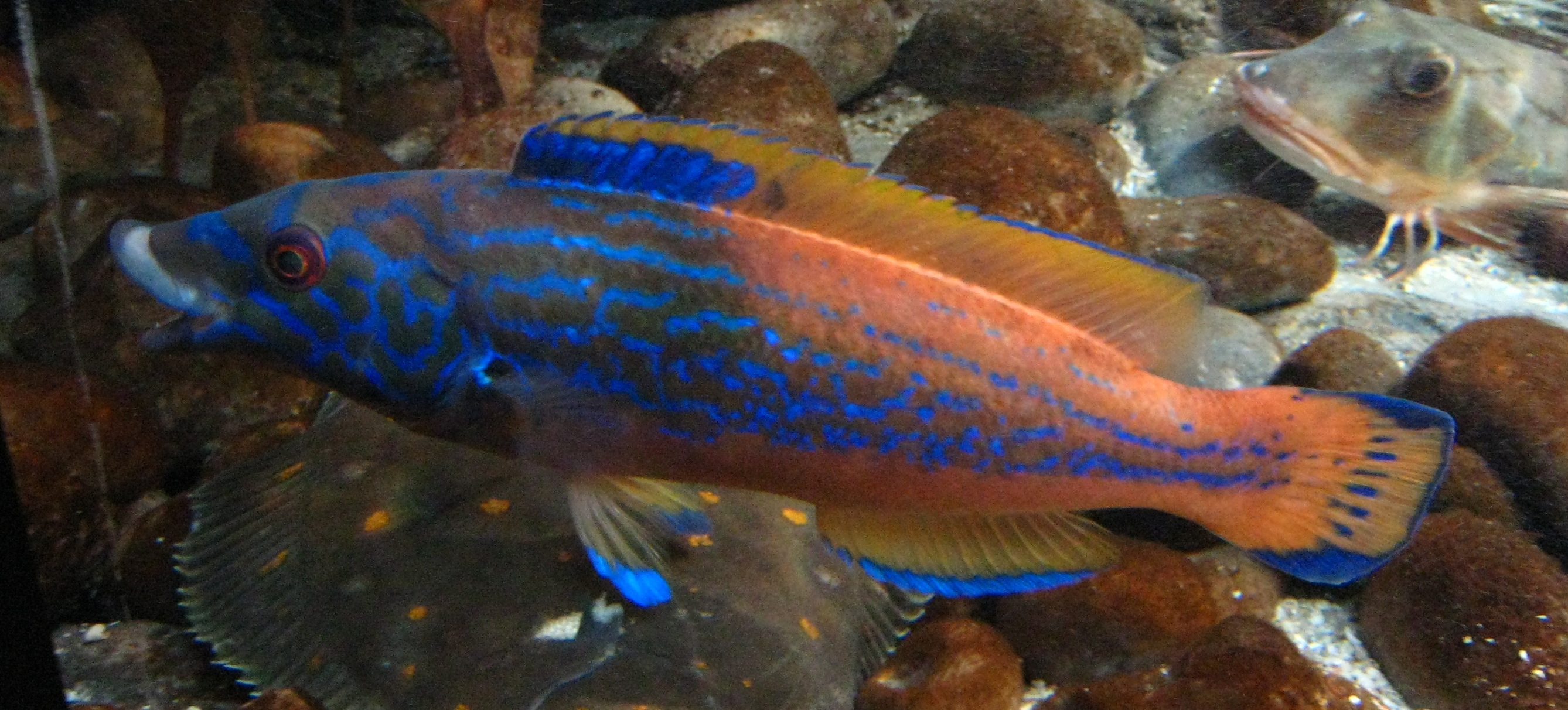
- Cuckoo wrasse (Labrus mixtus)
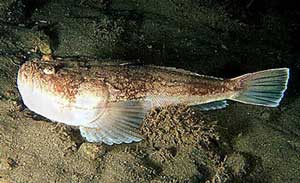
- Atlantic stargazer Uranoscopus scaber

Scientific classification
- Kingdom: Animalia
- Phylum: Chordata
- Class: Actinopterygii
- Division: Teleostei
- Clade: Eupercaria
- Order: Labriformes; Kaufman & Liem, 1982

Type species
- Labrus mixtus Linnaeus, 1758

Families
- See text

= Labriformes =

Labriformes Temporal range: Early Eocene–recent

Order of ray-finned fishes

Labriformes is an order of ray-finned fishes within the clade Percomorpha. Some authors include the Labriformes as the clade Labroidei within the Perciformes, while others include more families within the Labriformes, such as the cichlids and damselfishes. This order was previously restricted to wrasses, parrotfishes, cales, and their close relatives, but most recent studies suggest that the Labriformes also contain highly aberrant groups such as the stargazers and sand lances, which are placed in their own suborder. Almost all members of this order are marine, with the only exception being the amphidromous torrentfish of New Zealand.

== Families ==
These families are classified within this order, based on Catalog of Fishes (2025):

- Order Labriformes
  - Suborder Labroidei
    - Family Centrogenyidae Fowler, 1907 (false scorpionfishes)
    - Family Labridae Cuvier, 1816 (wrasses and parrotfishes)
    - ?Family †Tortonesiidae Sorbini, Boscaini & Bannikov, 1991
  - Suborder Uranoscopoidei
    - Family Ammodytidae Bonaparte, 1835 (sand lances)
    - Family Uranoscopidae Bonaparte ,1831 (stargazers)
    - Family Leptoscopidae Gill, 1859 (southern sandfishes)
    - Family Pinguipedidae Günther, 1860 (sandperches)
    - Family Cheimarrichthyidae Regan, 1913 (torrentfish)

Although traditionally considered its own family Scaridae, parrotfishes have more recently been found deeply nested within the wrasse family Labridae by molecular phylogenetics, such that parrotfishes are instead classified in the tribe Scarini.
