= Mercer's tusked silverside =

Scientific classification
- Kingdom: Animalia
- Phylum: Chordata
- Class: Actinopterygii
- Order: Atheriniformes
- Suborder: Atherinoidei
- Family: Dentatherinidae; Patten & Ivantsoff, 1983
- Genus: Dentatherina; Patten & Ivantsoff, 1983
- Species: D. merceri

Binomial name
- Dentatherina merceri Patten & Ivantsoff, 1983

Species of fish

Mercer's tusked silverside (Dentatherina merceri) is a species of fish. This species is the only member of the family Dentatherinidae.

Mercer's tusked silverside originates from the west-central Pacific. It is found from the Philippines to north-eastern Australia and from Moluccas to the Trobriand Islands. It is found close in shore around islands and over coral reefs. Except for larval biology, little is known about this species. It may be taken as food by some commercially important species.

Dentatherina was originally classified in the Atherinidae. In 1984, L. R. Parenti considered it and the other phallostethids to be sister taxa. However, ranking these two groups (Phallostethidae and Dentatherinidae) as two families within the same superfamily or two subfamilies (Dentatherininae and Phallostethinae) within Phallostethidae is a subjective decision. The distinctiveness of Dentatherina could be used in favor of separate family recognition. Fish Base considers this species to belong to its own family.
