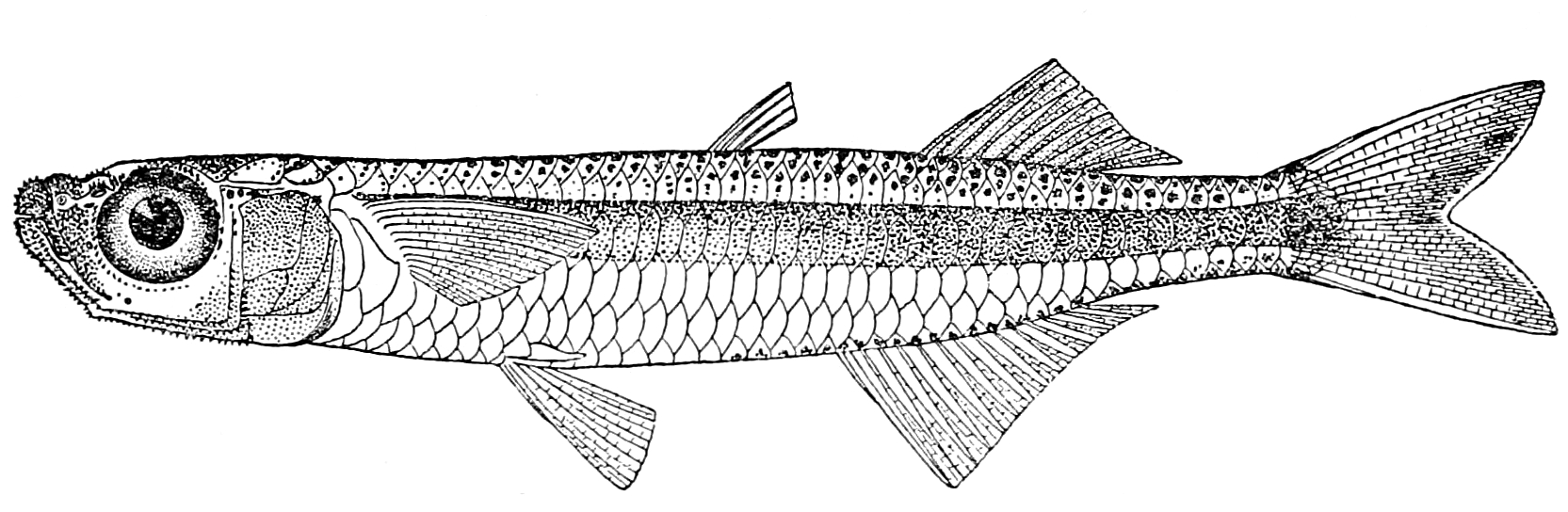
- Atherion elymus

Scientific classification
- Kingdom: Animalia
- Phylum: Chordata
- Class: Actinopterygii
- Order: Atheriniformes
- Family: Atherionidae; Schultz, 1948
- Genus: Atherion; D. S. Jordan & Starks, 1901

Type species
- Atherion elymus D.S. Jordan & Starks, 1901

Species
- 3 See text

= Atherion =

Genus of fishes

Atherion is a small genus of silversides, known as the pricklenose silversides. It is the only genus in the family Atherionidae. Other authorities classify this as a monogeneric subfamily, Atherioninae, of the Atherinidae, while others include it within the subfamily Atherinomorinae. They have an Indo-Pacific distribution.

== Characteristics ==
The species within Atherion are characterised by having rough, sharkskin-like denticles around the mouth and in other places on the head. The origin of the first dorsal fin is to the rear of the pelvic fin tip. The first dorsal fin has 3–6 spines while the second dorsal fin has a single spine and 8–13 soft rays. The anal fin also has a single spine and has 13–17 soft rays. Along the midlateral line they have a count of between 40 and 44 scales and they are small fish which grow to a maximum length of 5.5 centimetres (2.2 in).

== Species ==
The currently recognized species in this genus are:

- Atherion africanum J. L. B. Smith, 1965 (pricklenose silverside)
- Atherion elymus D. S. Jordan & Starks, 1901 (bearded silverside)
- Atherion maccullochi D. S. Jordan & C. L. Hubbs, 1919 (McCulloch's hardyhead)
