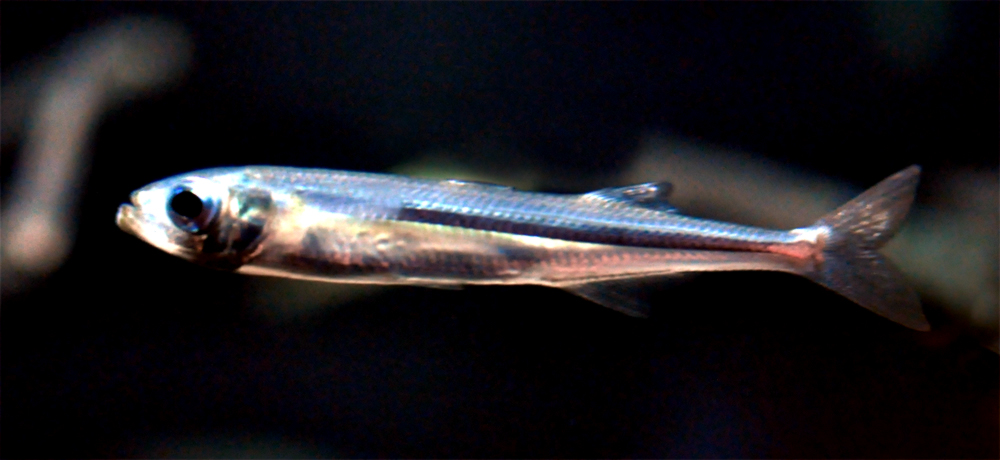
- Sand smelt Atherina presbyter

Scientific classification
- Kingdom: Animalia
- Phylum: Chordata
- Class: Actinopterygii
- Order: Atheriniformes
- Suborder: Atherinoidei

= Atherinoidei =

Suborder of fishes

Atherinoidei is a suborder of the order Atheriniformes comprising six families, with a mainly Old World distribution, although a few species are found in the western Atlantic Ocean.

== Families ==
The suborder contains the following families:

- Family Isonidae Rosen, 1964 (surf sardines)
- Family Bedotiidae Jordan & Hubbs, 1919 Madagascar rainbowfishes
- Family Melanotaeniidae Gill, 1894 Rainbowfishes and blue-eyes
- Family Pseudomugilidae Kner, 1867 Blue-eyes
- Family Telmatherinidae Munro, 1958 Celebes rainbowfishes
- Family Atherionidae Schultz, 1948 Pricklenose silversides
- Family Dentatherinidae Patten & Ivantsoff 1983 Mercer’s tusked silverside
- Family Phallostethidae Regan 1916 priapiumfishes
  - Subfamily Phallostethinae Regan, 1916
  - Subfamily Gulaphallinae Herre, 1925
- Family Atherinidae Risso, 1827 Old World silversides
  - Subfamily Atherinomorinae Dyer & Chernoff, 1996
  - Subfamily Craterocephalinae Dyer & Chernoff, 1966 Hardheads
  - Subfamily Bleheratherinae Aarn & Ivantsoff, 2009
  - Subfmaily Atherininae Risso, 1827
