= Surf silverside =

Scientific classification
- Kingdom: Animalia
- Phylum: Chordata
- Class: Actinopterygii
- Order: Atheriniformes
- Suborder: Atherinopsoidei
- Family: Notocheiridae; Schultz, 1950
- Genus: Notocheirus; H. W. Clark, 1937
- Species: N. hubbsi

Binomial name
- Notocheirus hubbsi H. W. Clark, 1937

Species of fish

The surf silverside (Notocheirus hubbsi) is a species of silverside from the order Atheriniformes found along the Pacific coast of Argentina and Chile. It is the only known member of its family and molecular evidence points to this species being sister to the Neotropical silversides of the family Atherinopsidae, with the Notocheiridae and the Atherinopsidae making up the suborder Atherinopsoidei. This species is characterised by the absence of a first dorsal fin. This species was described by Howard W. Clark in 1937 from types collected in the harbour of Valparaíso, Chile, and the specific name honours the American ichthyologist and authority on silversides, Carl Leavitt Hubbs (1894-1979).
