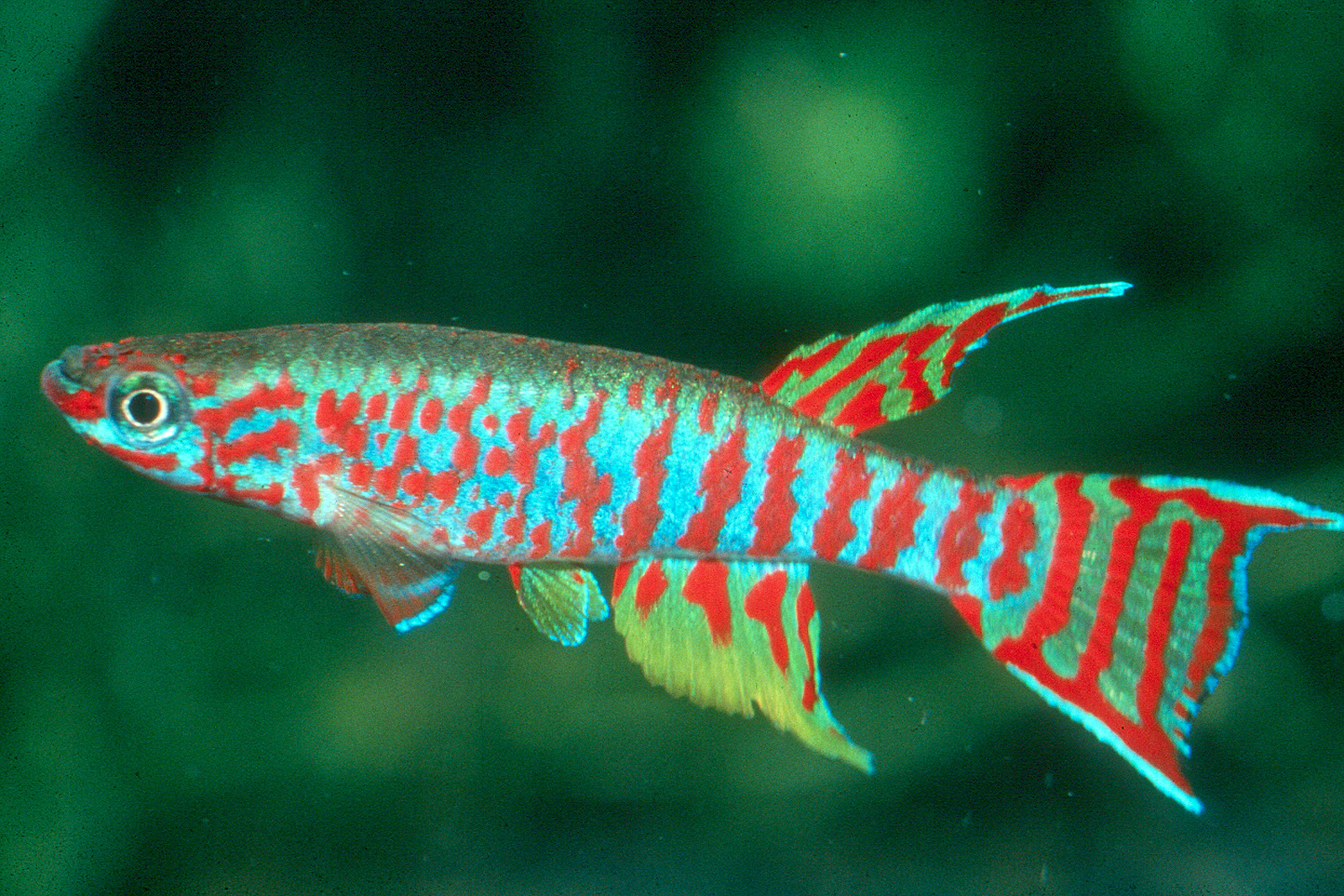
- Aphyosemion elberti
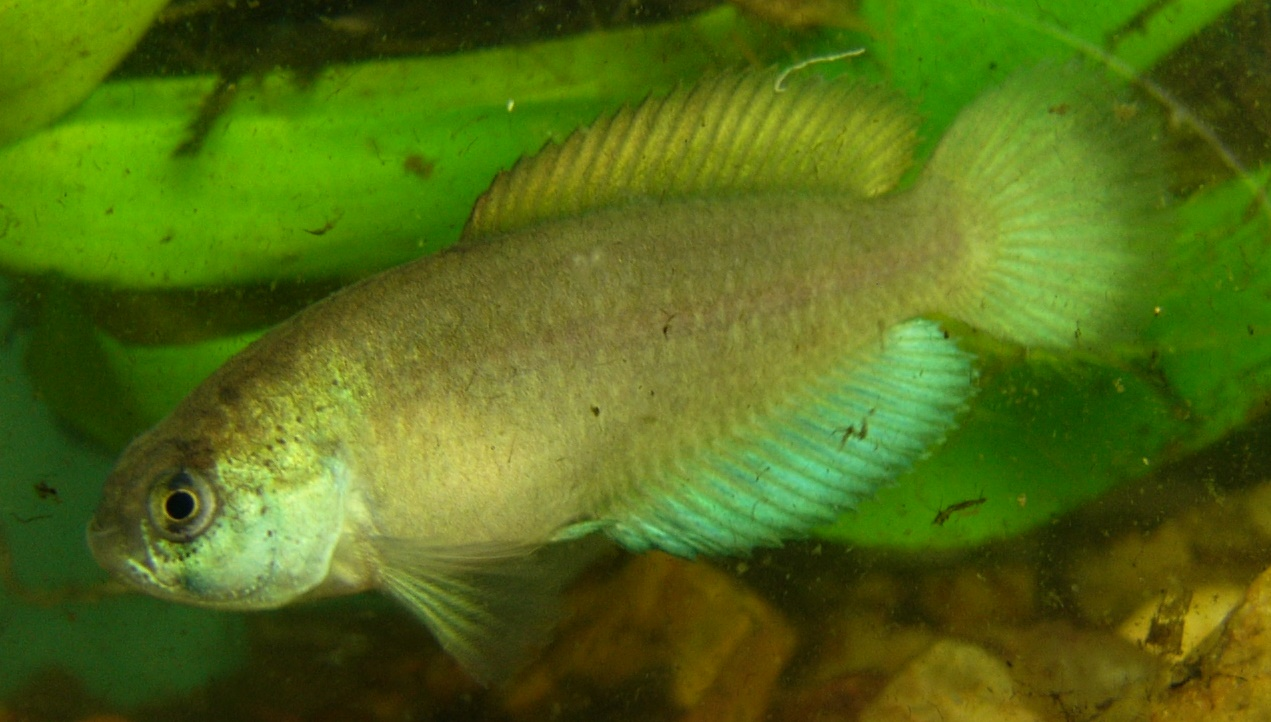
- Austrolebias quirogai

Scientific classification
- Kingdom: Animalia
- Phylum: Chordata
- Class: Actinopterygii
- Order: Cyprinodontiformes
- Suborder: Aplocheiloidei; Parenti, 1981

= Aplocheiloidei =

Aplocheiloidei Temporal range: Late Miocene to present

Suborder of fishes

Aplocheiloidei is a suborder of the order Cyprinodontiformes consisting of three families which are commonly known as killifishes.

== Families ==
The three families within the suborder Aplocheiloidei are:

- Aplocheilidae Bleeker, 1859
- Nothobranchiidae Garman, 1895
- Rivulidae Myers, 1925

The only known fossil member of the suborder is the Late Miocene-aged Kenyaichthys from the Lukeino Formation of Kenya, which is the only known member of the family Kenyaichthyidae Altner & Reichenbacher, 2015.

== Proposed taxonomy ==
Some authorities have lumped the three families into a single family, Aplocheilidae, a well-established name, chosen for its stability in usage over time, and to avoid the impact of a new name at the family rank for a popular aquarium fish group. Under this proposal, the Aplocheilidae includes three subfamilies: Aplocheilinae for the species from Asia, Madagascar and the Seychelles; Cynolebiinae (called Rivulidae above) for the species from the Americas; and Nothobranchiinae for the species from the African mainland.

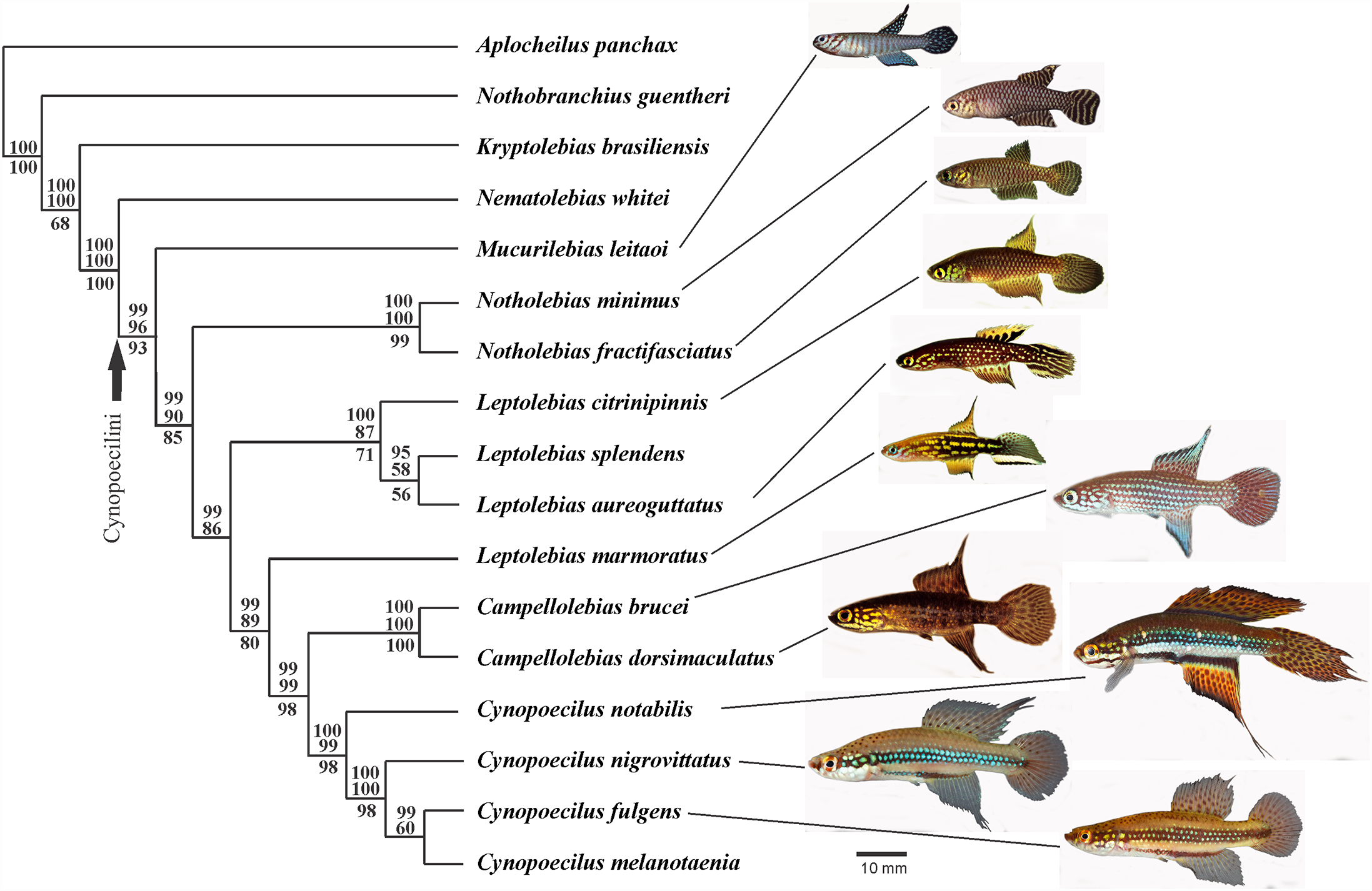
Phylogenetic relationships among 13 taxa of the Cynopoecilini and four outgroup taxa
