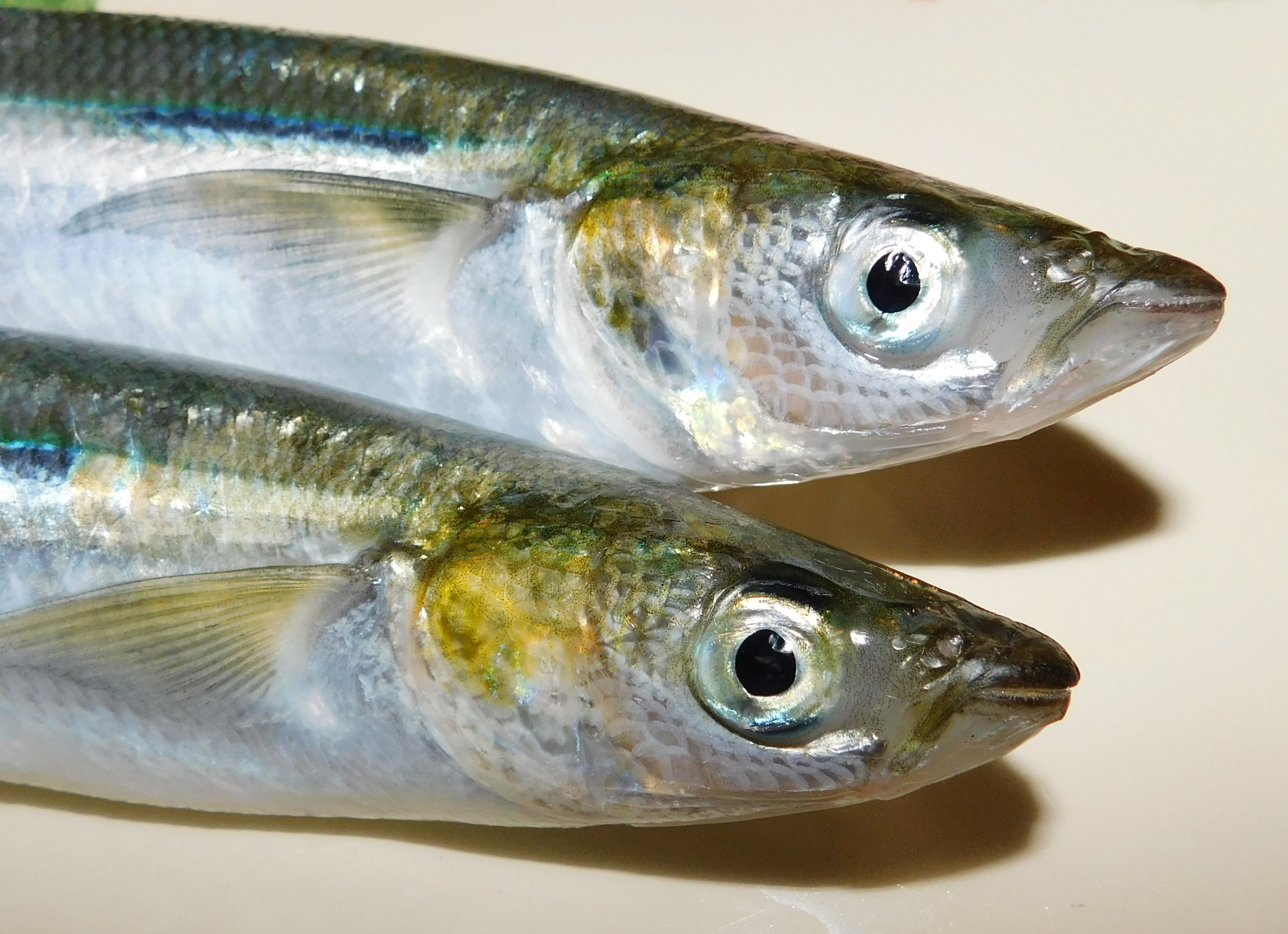
- California smelt Atherinopsis californiensis

Scientific classification
- Kingdom: Animalia
- Phylum: Chordata
- Class: Actinopterygii
- Order: Atheriniformes
- Suborder: Atherinopsoidei

= Atherinopsoidei =

Suborder of fishes

Atherinopsoidei is a suborder of the order Atheriniformes comprising two families, both of which are restricted to the Americas.

== Families ==
The suborder contains the following families:

- Family Atherinopsidae Fitzinger, 1873 (New World silversides)
- Family Notocheiridae Schultz, 1950 (Surf silversides)
