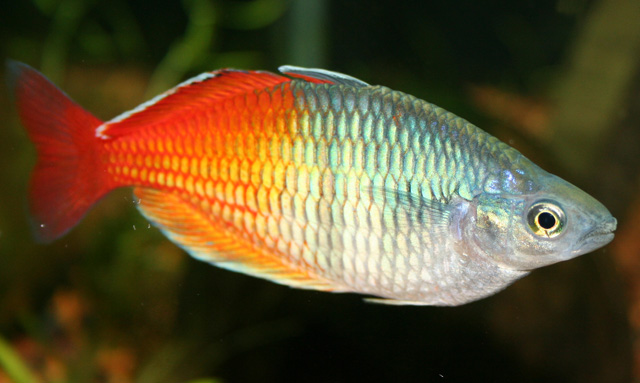
- Boeseman's rainbowfish, Melanotaenia boesemani, red variety
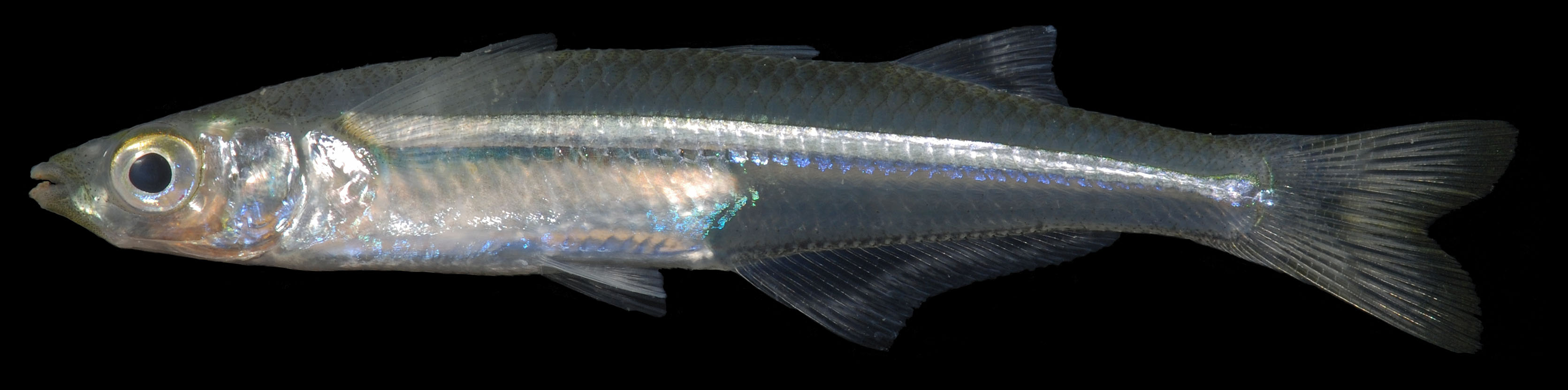
- Atlantic silverside, Menidia menidia

Scientific classification
- Kingdom: Animalia
- Phylum: Chordata
- Class: Actinopterygii
- Division: Teleostei
- (unranked): Atherinomorpha
- Order: Atheriniformes; D. E. Rosen, 1966

Type species
- Atherina hepsetus Linnaeus, 1758

Suborders
- Atherinopsoidei; Atherinoidei

= Atheriniformes =

Silversides Temporal range: Early Eocene to present

Order of fishes

The Atheriniformes, also known as the silversides, are an order of ray-finned fishes that includes the Old and New World silversides, the rainbowfishes, and several less-familiar families, including the unusual Phallostethidae. The order includes at least 354 species. They are found worldwide in tropical and temperate marine and freshwater environments.

== Description ==
Atheriniformes are generally elongated and silvery in colour, although exceptions do exist. They are typically small fish, with the largest being the Argentinian silverside, with a head-body length of 50 cm (20 in), but possibly up to 82 cm (32 in). The smallest species, such as the Bangkok minnow, reach only 2 cm (0.79 in) in adult length.

Members of the order usually have two dorsal fins, the first with flexible spines, and an anal fin with one spine at the front. The lateral line is typically weak or absent. Atheriniform larvae share several characteristics; the gut is unusually short, a single row of melanophores occurs along the back, and the fin rays do not become evident until some time after hatching. They scatter their eggs widely, with most species attaching them to aquatic plants.

== Taxonomy ==
Classification of the Atheriniformes is uncertain, with the best evidence for monophyly in the larval characteristics mentioned below. Their closest relatives are thought to be the Cyprinodontiformes.

Nelson 2016 recognizes the infraseries Atherinomorpha, part of the sub series Ovalentaria which includes the orders Atheriniformes, Beloniformes, and Cyprinodontiformes, citing the larval characteristics and supporting molecular studies of these taxa as support for monophyly of this grouping. The sister taxon to the Atherinomorpha appears to be the Mugiliformes.

Following Nelson (2006), the family Melanotaeniidae includes the subfamilies Bedotiinae, Melanotaeniinae, Pseudomugilinae, and Telmatherininae, to demonstrate their monophyly. However, in a 2004 study, a different classification scheme classifies the families Bedotiidae, Melanotaeniidae, and Pseudomugilidae (also include Telmatherinine genera) in a suborder Melanotaenioidei. Thus, the number of families in Atheriniformes varies from author to author.

Based on Eschmeyer's Catalog of Fishes (2026):

- Order Atheriniformes
  - Suborder Atherinopsoidei
    - Family Atherinopsidae (New World silversides)
  - Suborder Atherinoidei
    - Family Atherinidae (Old World silversides)
    - Family Atherionidae (pricklenose silversides)
    - Family Isonidae (surf sardines)
    - Family Phallostethidae (priapum fishes)
    - Family Atherinomoridae (tropical silversides)
    - Family Craterocephalidae (hardyheads)
    - Family Dentatherinidae (tusked silversides)
    - Family Bedotiidae (Malagasy rainbowfishes)
    - Family Pseudomugilidae (blue eyes)
    - Family Telmatherinidae (sailfin silversides)
    - Family Melanotaeniidae (rainbowfishes)

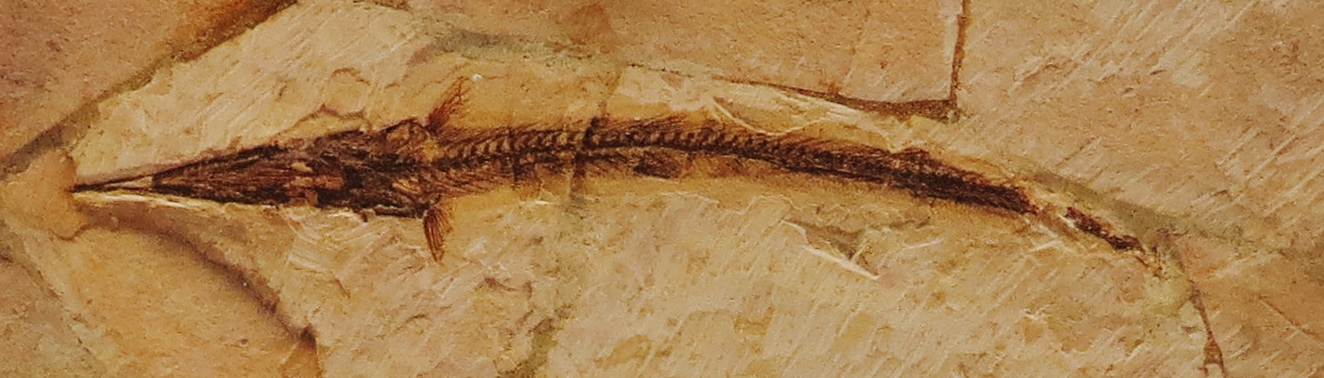
Rhamphognathus, a unique predatory silverside from the Eocene

In addition, two extinct families (Mesogasteridae, containing Latellagnathus and Mesogaster, and Rhamphognathidae, containing only Rhamphognathus) are known from the Early Eocene of Monte Bolca, Italy. Uniquely, these large-sized atheriniforms appear to have adapted for a macropredatory lifestyle, potentially due to open ecological niches at the time.
