= Hardyhead =

Hardyhead refers to a number of species of fish in the family Atherinidae, including:

- Dalhousie hardyhead (Craterocephalus dalhousiensis)
- Darling River hardyhead (Craterocephalus amniculus)
- Drysdale hardyhead (Craterocephalus helenae)
- Finke River hardyhead (Craterocephalus centralis)
- Fly-specked hardyhead (Craterocephalus stercusmuscarum)
- Glover's hardyhead (Craterocephalus gloveri)
- Hardyhead silverside (Atherinomorus lacunosus)
- Kailola's hardyhead (Craterocephalus kailolae)
- Kutubu hardyhead (Craterocephalus lacustris)
- Magela hardyhead (Craterocephalus marianae)
- Murray hardyhead (Craterocephalus fluviatilis)
- Pima hardyhead (Craterocephalus pimatuae)
- Prince Regent hardyhead (Craterocephalus lentiginosus)
