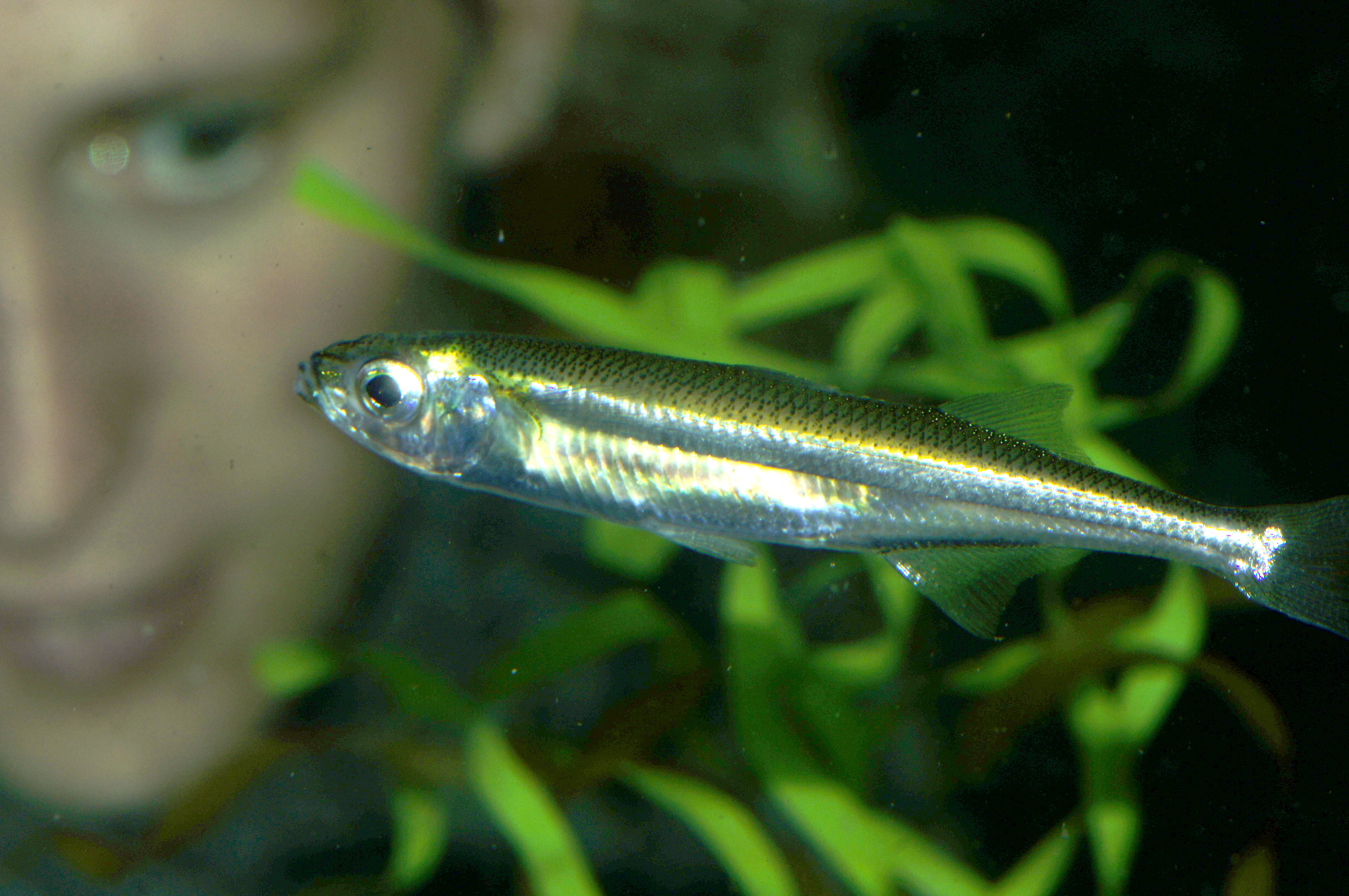
- Sand smelt (Atherina presbyter)

Scientific classification
- Kingdom: Animalia
- Phylum: Chordata
- Class: Actinopterygii
- Division: Teleostei
- Order: Atheriniformes
- Family: Atherinidae
- Subfamily: Atherininae; Risso, 1827

Genera
- See text

= Atherininae =

Subfamily of fishes

Atherininae is a subfamily of silversides from the family, Atherinidae, the Old World silversides.

== Genera ==
The subfamily contains the following genera:

- Atherina Linnaeus, 1758
- Atherinason Whitley, 1934
- Atherinosoma Castelnau, 1872
- Kestratherina A. Pavlov, Ivantsoff, Last & Crowley, 1988
- Leptatherina Pavlov, Ivantsoff, Last & Crowley, 1988
