= Samoan silverside =

Conservation status
- Least Concern (IUCN 3.1)

Scientific classification
- Kingdom: Animalia
- Phylum: Chordata
- Class: Actinopterygii
- Division: Teleostei
- Order: Atheriniformes
- Family: Atherinidae
- Genus: Hypoatherina
- Species: H. temminckii

Binomial name
- Hypoatherina temminckii Bleeker 1854

Species of fish

Hypoatherina temminckii, the Samoan silverside, Is a small species of coastal fish In the subfamily Atherinomorinae, and is distributed across the coasts of the Indo-Pacific region.

== Description ==
The fish has an elongated, oval-shaped body that is mostly transparent with a blue-green tint, a silver belly, and a narrow silver stripe running down its side. Its back fin has 6 to 8 spines and 8 to 10 soft rays, while its bottom fin has 1 spine and 11 to 14 soft rays. Depending on the specific fish, you might also see two rows of tiny dark spots just below the side stripe. Finally, its jaw structure features a moderately long upper jaw and a lower jaw that is noticeably tall at the back.
