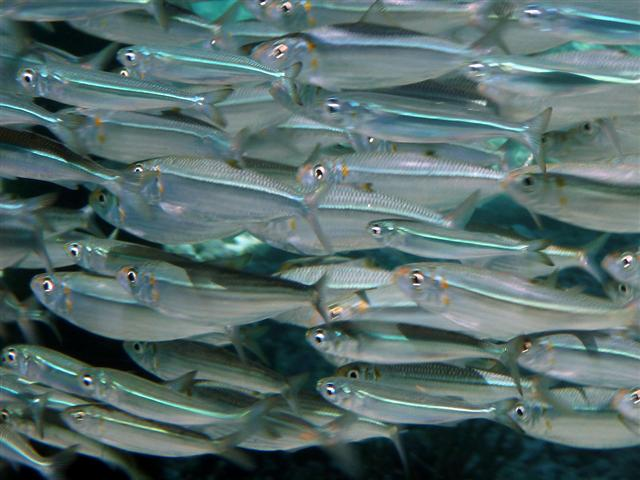
- Barnes' silverside, Maldives

Scientific classification
- Kingdom: Animalia
- Phylum: Chordata
- Class: Actinopterygii
- Order: Atheriniformes
- Family: Atherinidae
- Subfamily: Atherinomorinae
- Genus: Hypoatherina; L. P. Schultz, 1948

Type species
- Atherina uisila Jordan & Seale, 1906

= Hypoatherina =

Genus of fishes

Hypoatherina is a genus of silversides in the family Atherinidae. There are found in the tropical habitats of Indian and Pacific to the western Atlantic Ocean.

== Species ==
There are currently 14 recognized species in this genus:

- Hypoatherina barnesi L. P. Schultz, 1953 (Barnes' silverside)
- Hypoatherina celebesensis D. Sasaki & Kimura, 2012 (Sulawesi silverside)
- Hypoatherina gobio (Klunzinger, 1884)
- Hypoatherina golanii D. Sasaki & Kimura, 2012 (Red Sea silverside)
- Hypoatherina klunzingeri (Smith, 1965)
- Hypoatherina lunata D. Sasaki & Kimura, 2012 (Okinawan silverside)
- Hypoatherina macrophthalma D. Sasaki & Kimura, 2012
- Hypoatherina ovalaua (Herre, 1935) (Fijian silverside)
- Hypoatherina panatela (D. S. Jordan & R. E. Richardson, 1908) (panatela silverside)
- Hypoatherina temminckii (Bleeker, 1854) (Samoan silverside)
- Hypoatherina tropicalis (Whitley, 1948) (Whitley's silverside)
- Hypoatherina tsurugae (D. S. Jordan & Starks, 1901) (Cobalt silverside)
- Hypoatherina uisila (D. S. Jordan & Seale, 1906) (Pacific silverside)
- Hypoatherina villosa (Duncker & Mohr, 1926)

Fishbase has H. gobio as a synonym of H. temminckii and H. klunzingeri as a synonym of H. barnesi, while H. panatela is listed as Stenatherina panatela, other authorities include these species within Hypoatherina and place H. crenolepsis, H. harringtonensis, H. ovalaua in the genus Atherina and H. valencennei in Doboatherina.
