= Teramulus waterloti =

Conservation status
- Endangered (IUCN 3.1)

Scientific classification
- Kingdom: Animalia
- Phylum: Chordata
- Class: Actinopterygii
- Order: Atheriniformes
- Family: Atherinidae
- Genus: Teramulus
- Species: T. waterloti

Binomial name
- Teramulus waterloti (Pellegrin, 1932)

Synonyms
- Atherina duodecimalis waterloti Pellegrin, 1932

Species of fish

Teramulus waterloti is a species of silverside from the subfamily Atherinomorinae which is endemic to Madagascar. This species occurs in rivers, creeks, and streams in north western Madagascar from the Mananjeba River south to the Anjingo River. The IUCN classify this species as Endangered and it is threatened by deforestation which degrades its habitat through sedimentation and by the introduction of invasive fish species such as Channa maculata. This fish was described in 1932 as the subspecies waterloti of Atherina duodecimalis by Jacques Pellegrin who named it after Georges Waterlot (1877–1939), a collector of specimens in Africa and Madagascar for Muséum national d'histoire naturelle, including the type of this species, which he collected from Antikotazo Creek, District d'Ambilobé, Diégo Suarez Province.
