= Dalhousie hardyhead =

Conservation status
- Critically Endangered (IUCN 3.1)

Scientific classification
- Kingdom: Animalia
- Phylum: Chordata
- Class: Actinopterygii
- Order: Atheriniformes
- Family: Atherinidae
- Genus: Craterocephalus
- Species: C. dalhousiensis

Binomial name
- Craterocephalus dalhousiensis Ivantsoff & Glover, 1974

Species of fish

The Dalhousie hardyhead (Craterocephalus dalhousiensis) is a species of silverside in the family Atherinidae. It is endemic to the warm waters of Dalhousie Springs in the Lake Eyre basin, Australia, along with the similar Craterocephalus gloveri. It inhabits shady areas in tropical freshwater streams at 20-39 °C, but has been recorded at 41.8 °C. Its food consists of gastropods, aquatic plants, green filamentous algae, detritus and small invertebrates; food is mainly taken from the substrate.

The species is generally golden brown with a darker brown back. A dark midlateral band runs from the snout to the base of the caudal fin. Two to three rows of pigmented scales form discontinuous lines below the midlateral band. It is the only species in the genus Craterocephalus known to be sexually dimorphic. Adult males are smaller and exhibit a rounded belly compared to the flattened belly of females. Males also lack the forehead concavity exhibited by females.

As of July 2024, it is listed as critically endangered under the EBPC Act.
