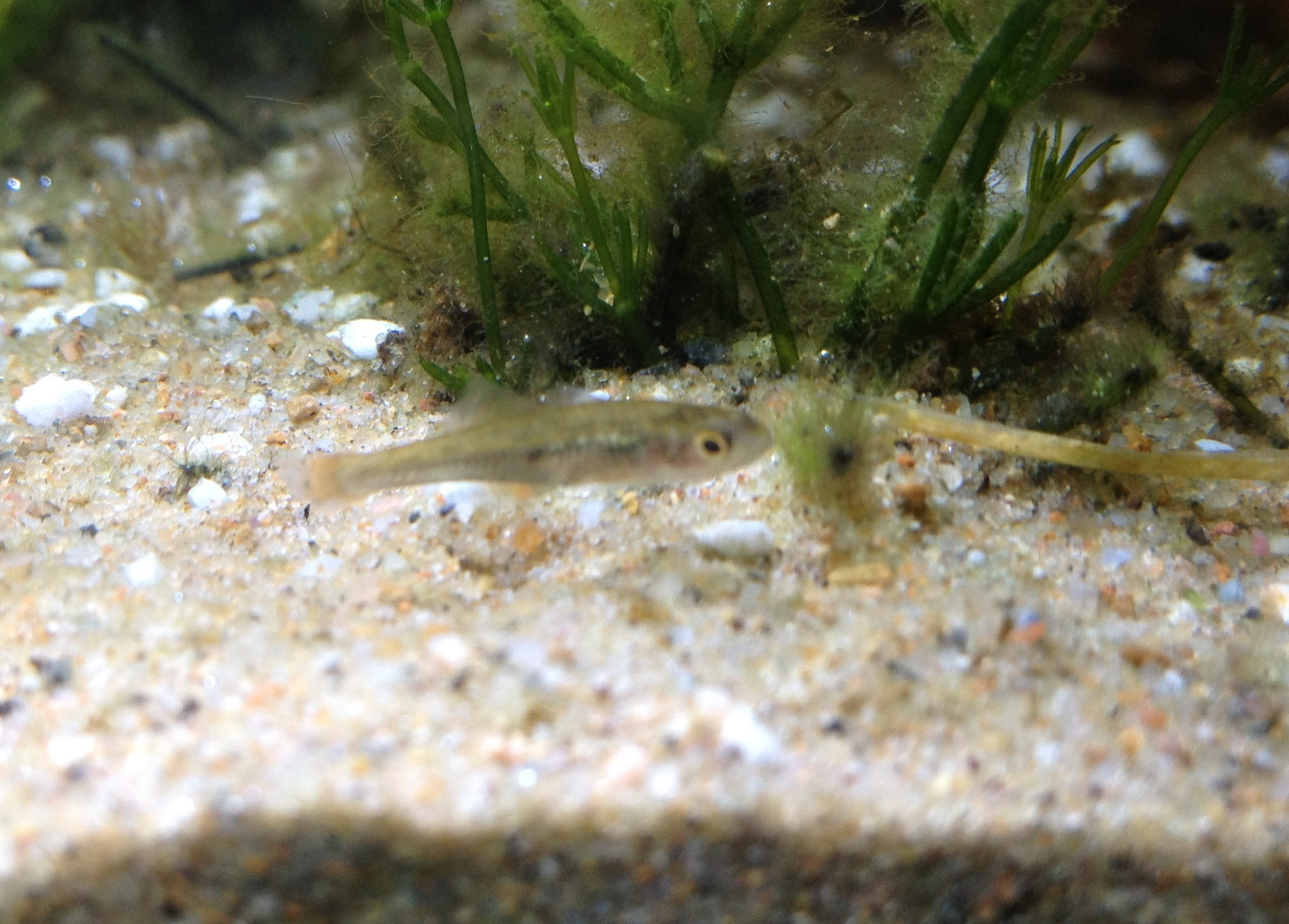

Scientific classification
- Kingdom: Animalia
- Phylum: Chordata
- Class: Actinopterygii
- Order: Atheriniformes
- Family: Atherinidae
- Genus: Craterocephalus
- Species: C. marjoriae

Binomial name
- Craterocephalus marjoriae Whitley, 1948

= Craterocephalus marjoriae =

Species of fish

Craterocephalus marjoriae, commonly known as Marjorie's hardyhead or silverstreak hardyhead, is a species of fish in the family Atherinidae that is native to eastern Australia, namely central Queensland to northeastern New South Wales. Here it inhabits clear flowing streams and it is common among the vegetation in their margins. It prefers shallow water over streambeds consisting of sand or gravel. It forms shoals. They spawn on multiple occasions between September and January, although this peaks earlier in the season. They form pairs for spawning, the eggs being deposited on aquatic vegetation to which they adhere. The eggs are large measuring 1.15-1.25 mm in diameter and have adhesive filaments. The eggs hatch after around a week and the larvae measure about 5.7 mm standard length. Their diet consist mostly of aquatic insects and their larvae, small crustaceans, algae and fish eggs. This species was described by Gilbert P. Whitley in 1948 with the type locality given as Eidsvold on the Burnett River in Queensland. Whitley may have named this species in honour of his sister Marjorie Frewer.
