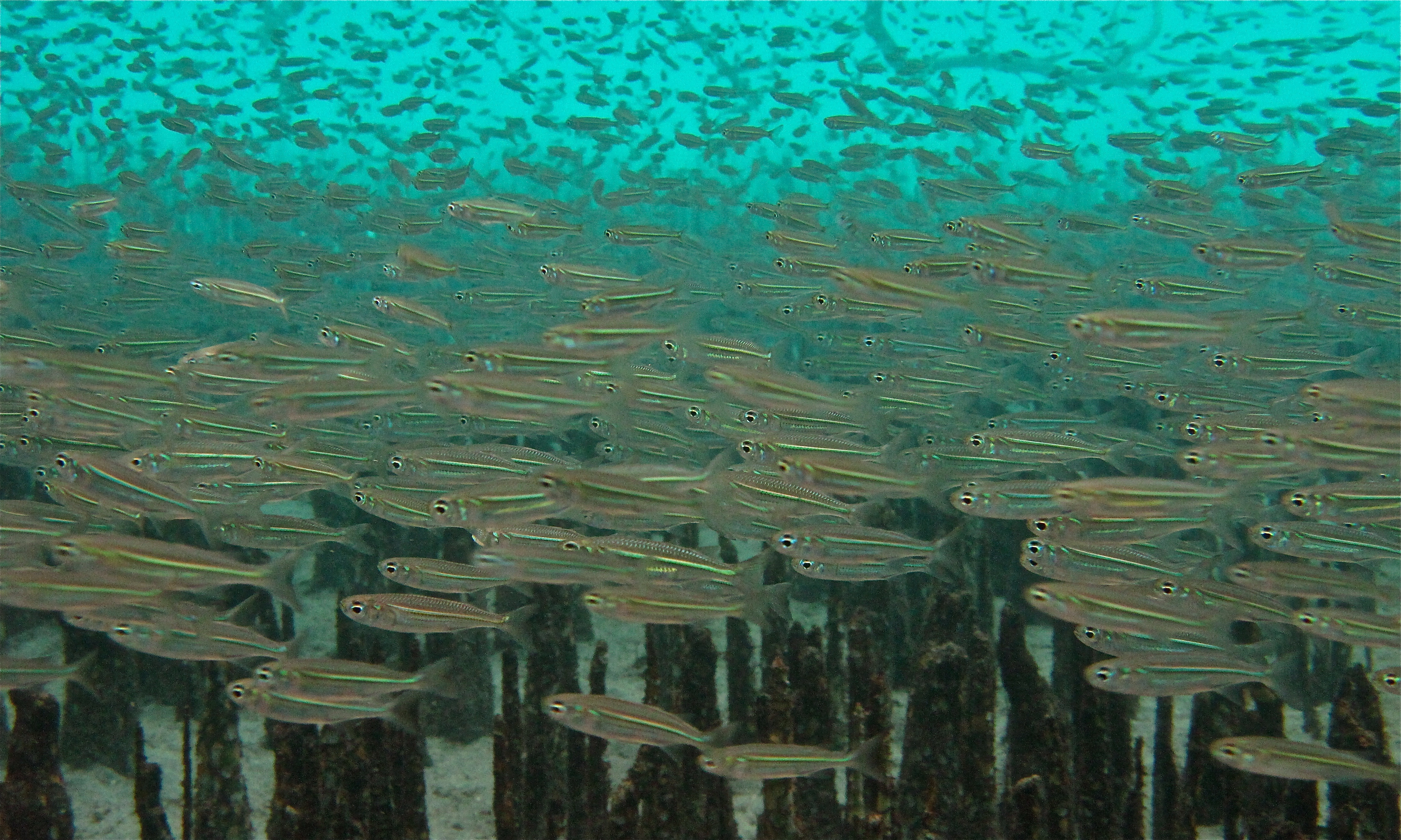

Conservation status
- Vulnerable (IUCN 2.3)

Scientific classification
- Kingdom: Animalia
- Phylum: Chordata
- Class: Actinopterygii
- Order: Atheriniformes
- Family: Atherinidae
- Genus: Atherinomorus
- Species: A. lineatus

Binomial name
- Atherinomorus lineatus (Günther, 1872)

Synonyms
- Atherina lineata Günther, 1872; Paratherina lineata (Günther, 1872)

= Lined silverside =

Species of fish

The lined silverside (Atherinomorus lineatus) is a species of fish in the family Atherinidae. It is found in Indonesia and the Philippines. This species was described as Atherina lineata by Albert Günther in 1872 with the type locality given as Cebu.
