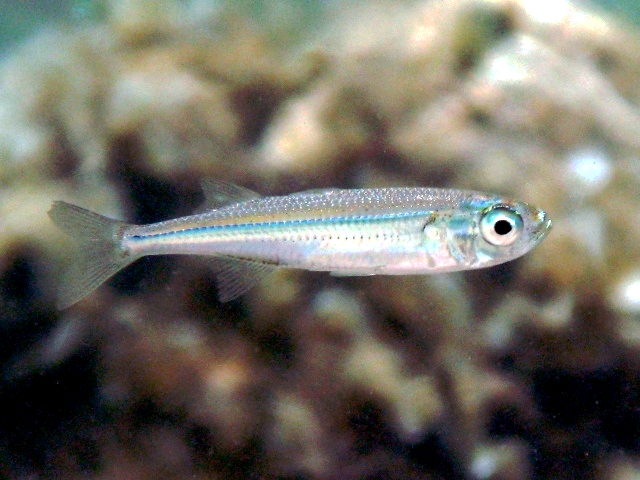
- Big-scale sand smelt from the offshore of Sardinia, Italy

Conservation status
- Least Concern (IUCN 3.1)

Scientific classification
- Kingdom: Animalia
- Phylum: Chordata
- Class: Actinopterygii
- Order: Atheriniformes
- Family: Atherinidae
- Genus: Atherina
- Species: A. boyeri

Binomial name
- Atherina boyeri A. Risso, 1810

Synonyms
- Atherina anterina Nardo, 1847; Atherina mochon Cuvier, 1829; Hepsetia mochon (Cuvier, 1829); Atherina caspia Eichwald, 1831; Atherina pontica Eichwald, 1831; Atherina risso Valenciennes, 1835; Atherina sarda Valenciennes, 1835; Atherina lacustris Bonaparte, 1836; Atherina anterina Nardo, 1847; Atherina rissoi Günther, 1861; Atherina hyalosoma Cocco, 1885; Atherina riqueti Roule, 1902; Atherina sardinella Fowler, 1903; Atherina bonapartii Boulenger, 1907

= Big-scale sand smelt =

Species of fish

The big-scale sand smelt (Atherina boyeri) is a species of fish in the family Atherinidae. It is a euryhaline amphidromous fish, up to 20 cm in length.

== Description ==
It is a small pelagic fish species which occurs near the surface in the littoral estuarine zone: in lagoons, salt marshes (77 psu), shallow brackish areas (2 psu) and inland waters which are rather unsuitable for other fish species, due to their high ionic strength and salinity.

Body is rather long, slender, moderately flattened. Eyes are large. Head and body are scaly. Mouth is protractible, upwardly directed, with small teeth. Lower jaw has an upper expansion within mouth (high dentary bone). There are two separate dorsal fins, with all rays of first and 1–2 anterior rays of second dorsal fin being unsegmented. The anal fin is similar to the second dorsal fin, while the caudal fin is forked. The first dorsal fin has 6–10 flexible spines.

It is an omnivorous species feeding on zoo-plankton and small bottom-living animals (crustacean gammarids, polychaete worms and molluscs).

== Range ==
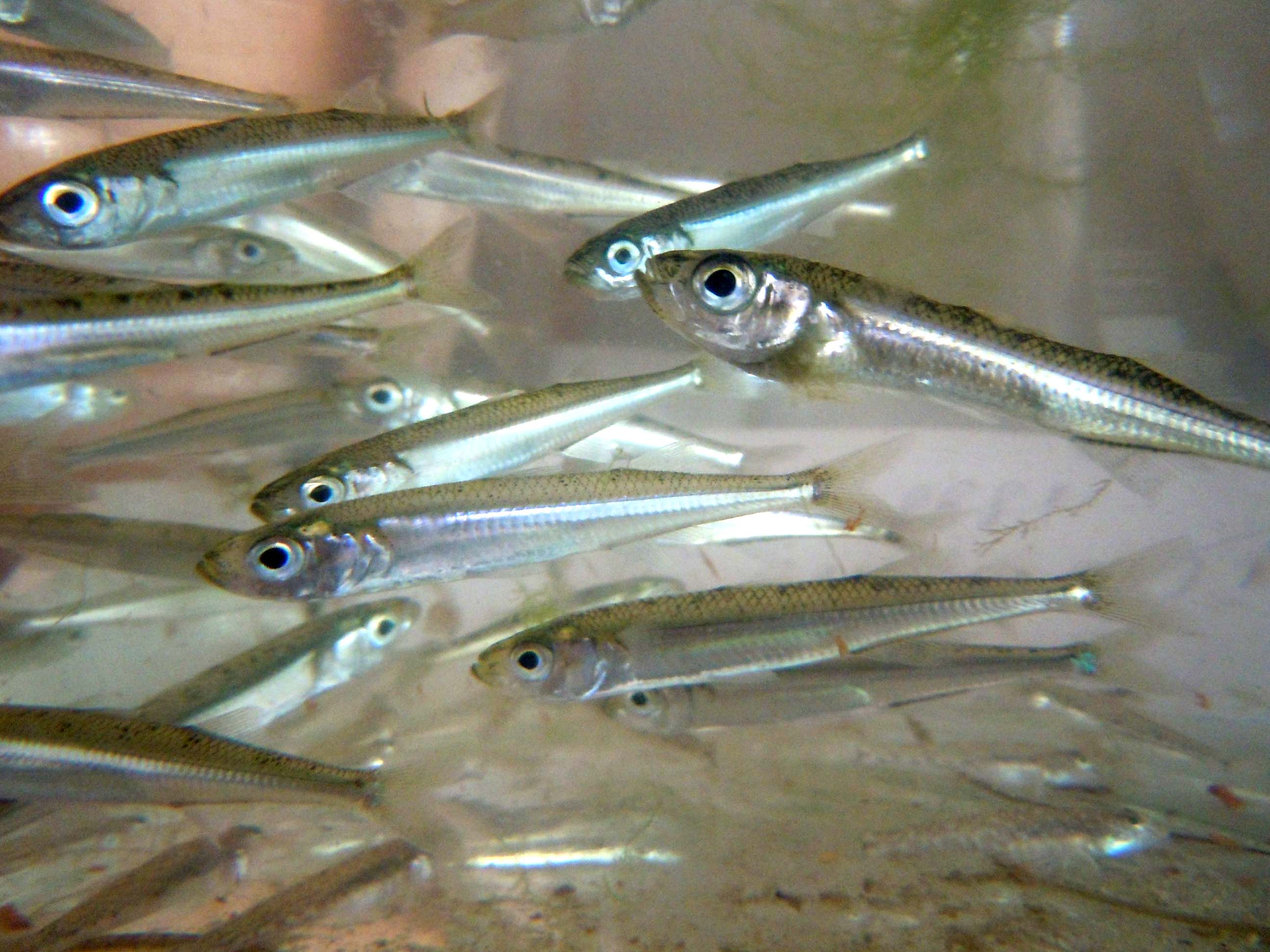
Atherina boyeri from the Gulf of Odesa, Black Sea, Ukraine

It is found in the eastern Atlantic from Portugal and Spain to Nouadhibou (Mauritania) and Madeira. Also it occurs in the Mediterranean, including the inshore lagoons, such as Trasimeno and Lesina in Italy, Hyères in the southern France such as Marseille and Lake Qarun in Egypt; an isolated population is found near the coasts of England and the Netherlands. In the Black Sea, it is widespread along all coasts, in lagoons and estuaries, in the downstreams of rivers Danube, Dniester, Southern Bug, Inhulets, and Dnieper, with a permanent population is in the Kakhovka Reservoir.

The isolated population in the Caspian Sea is characterised as subspecies A. b. caspia (Eichwald, 1838).

== Fishing ==
The major small-scale fishing gears exploiting this species are coastal beach seines, small mesh size (10 mm) gill nets and lift-nets. It is often used as bait fish on small and medium longlines, handlines, fishing using rods and reels, as trolling bait, even as bait in fish traps.

== Gastronomy ==
This small fish is appreciated in the Italian, Spanish, French, Turkish, and Greek cuisines. The fish are lightly powdered with wheat flour before being fried in hot olive oil.

== Etymology ==
The specific name of this species honours the medieval poet and scientist Guillaume Boyer who was a native of Nice, the type locality for this species.
