= Doboatherina balabacensis =

Scientific classification
- Kingdom: Animalia
- Phylum: Chordata
- Class: Actinopterygii
- Division: Teleostei
- Order: Atheriniformes
- Family: Atherinidae
- Genus: Doboatherina
- Species: D. balabacensis

Binomial name
- Doboatherina balabacensis (Seale, 1910)

Synonyms
- Atherina balabacensis Seale, 1910; Atherinomorus balabacensis (Seale, 1910)

Species of Actinopterygii

Doboatherina balabacensis, also called the Balabac Island silverside, is a species of fish in the Old world silverside family, Atherinidae. It occurs in the western Pacific, and its common name refers to Balabac Island, of the Philippines.
