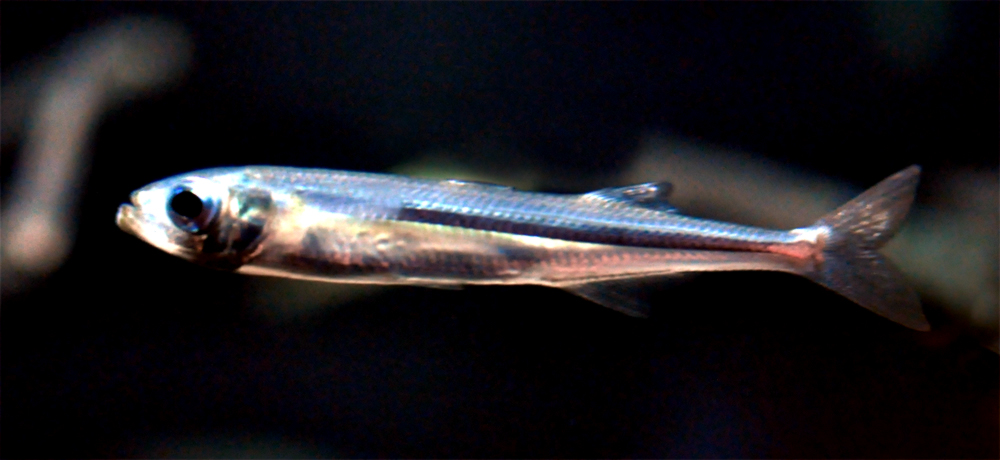
- The sand smelt (Atherina presbyter) in the Océanopolis Aquarium, Brest, France

Conservation status
- Least Concern (IUCN 3.1)

Scientific classification
- Kingdom: Animalia
- Phylum: Chordata
- Class: Actinopterygii
- Order: Atheriniformes
- Family: Atherinidae
- Genus: Atherina
- Species: A. presbyter

Binomial name
- Atherina presbyter G. Cuvier, 1829

Synonyms
- Hepsetia presbyter (Cuvier, 1829)

= Sand smelt =

Species of fish

The sand smelt (Atherina presbyter) is a species of marine ray-finned fish belonging to the family Atherinidae, the silversides. This species is found in the Northeastern Atlantic Ocean.

== Taxonomy ==
The sand smelt was first formally described in 1829 by the French zoologist Georges Cuvier, with its type locality given as the Atlantic coast of France. This species is classified in the genus Atherina in the silversides family, Atherinidae.

== Etymology ==
The sand smelt is a member of the genus Atherina. This name is derived from an ancient name for the Mediterranean sand smelt (A. hepstus), atherine, which can be dated at least as far back as Aristotle. The specific name, presbyter, means an elder or minister of the Christian Church. This is a latinisation of the French vernacular name for this fish, prêtre, which means "priest", the name given to this fish because there is a silvery band on the flanks, which was taken to resemble a stole.

== Distribution and habitat ==
The sand smelt is found in the Northeastern Atlantic Ocean, from the Kattegat and Scotland south to Mauritania and into the Western Mediterranean. Its range includes the Macaronesian Islands, although it is not recorded from the Azores. The sand smelt is a pelagic species of estuaries and coastal areas.

== Biology ==
Sand smelt are a schooling species which undertake seasonal migrations in the Atlantic. They are carnivorous and prey on small crustaceans and fish larvae. Reproduction takes place in the spring and summer, in the North Sea and the English Channel. Spawning takes place over midsummer.

Sand smelt generally live in semi-isolated populations around river estuaries. A population living around the entrance to Southampton Water was found to spawn in the April–June period within inshore algae beds before moving out into the deeper waters of the Solent.

The small size of the sand smelt means it is often unable to escape being drawn onto screens used to remove fish and weeds from power station cooling water intakes. In the case of the Southampton Water population, it was the species most commonly found on the Fawley Power Station screens.
