= Craterocephalus stramineus =

Conservation status
- Least Concern (IUCN 3.1)

Scientific classification
- Kingdom: Animalia
- Phylum: Chordata
- Class: Actinopterygii
- Order: Atheriniformes
- Family: Atherinidae
- Genus: Craterocephalus
- Species: C. stramineus

Binomial name
- Craterocephalus stramineus (Whitley, 1950)

Synonyms
- Quirichthys stramineus (Whitley, 1950); Quiris stramineus Whitley, 1950

Species of fish

Craterocephalus stramineus commonly called blackmast or strawman is a species of Actinopterygii fish that was described by Gilbert Percy Whitley in 1950. Craterocephalus stramineus belongs to the genus Craterocephalus, and family Atherinidae. It has no subspecies listed.
