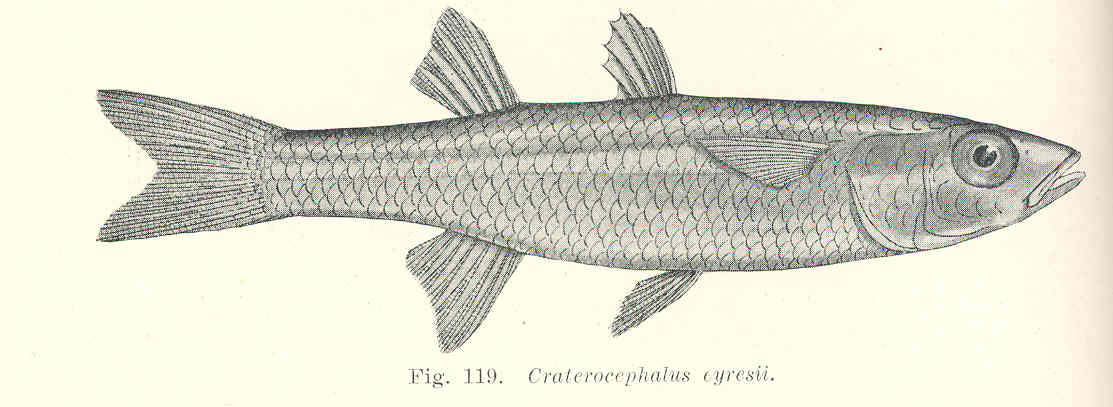

Scientific classification
- Kingdom: Animalia
- Phylum: Chordata
- Class: Actinopterygii
- Division: Teleostei
- Order: Atheriniformes
- Family: Atherinidae
- Genus: Craterocephalus
- Species: C. eyresii

Binomial name
- Craterocephalus eyresii (Steindachner, 1883

Synonyms
- Atherinichthys eyresii Steindachner, 1883; Atherina interioris Zietz, 1909

= Craterocephalus eyresii =

Species of fish

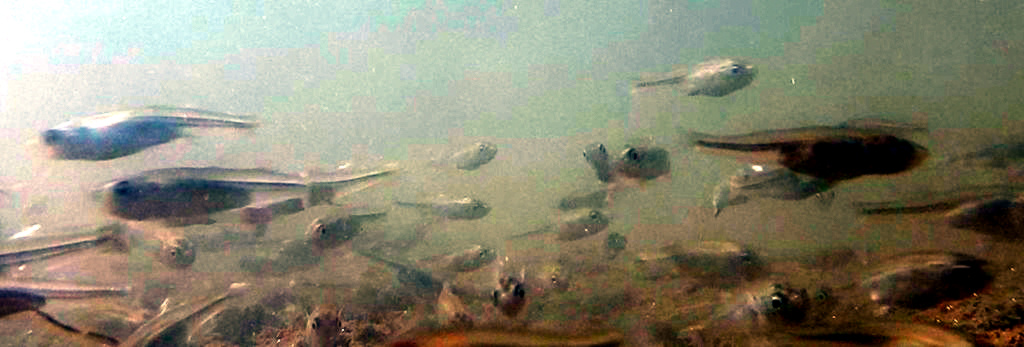
Lake Eyre Hardyhead

Craterocephalus eyresii, the Lake Eyre hardyhead, is a species of freshwater silverside from the family Atherinidae which is endemic to the Lake Eyre basin in Australia.

Until the late 20th century, this taxon was more widely circumscribed. After it was revealed to be a cryptic species complex, C.eyresii was split up into four species – apart from the Lake Eyre hardyhead proper, these are the Darling River hardyhead (C. amniclus), Finke River hardyhead (C. centralis), and Murray hardyhead (C. fluviatilis), each of the four being restricted to their namesake river basins. Until then, only the Murray-Murrumbidgee population had been comprehensively studied. Thus, until the 1990s, much of the published information which supposedly refers to "Lake Eyre hardyheads" actually refers to the Murray hardyhead.

== Description ==
Craterocephalus eyresii is a small, drab yellowish-grey coloured fish with greenish-silvery underside, transparent yellowish fins, and dark melanpophores around a silver mid-lateral stripe. There are two dorsal fins which are widely separated with the first dorsal fin originating before the tips of the ventral fins and the anal fin origin lies directly underneath the origin of second dorsal fin. The caudal fin is forked. The fins are yellowish in colour. It attains a maximum total length of 10 centimetres (3.9 in).

== Distribution ==
Craterocephalus eyresii is endemic to Lake Eyre and rivers to the south and west of it in South Australia. It also occurs in Lake Frome and its drainage basin in the northern Flinders Ranges as well as Lake Torrens and its tributaries.

== Habitat and biology ==
Craterocephalus eyresii is found in a variety of wetlands from swamps to rivers. It is common wherever it occurs and it is normally found among aquatic vegetation and over gravel substrates in lakes or in the slow-flowing parts of streams. It may be found in both turbid and clear water. It can also inhabit ephemeral rivers, streams, natural springs, salt lakes and man-made bores where it prefers to stay around submerged vegetation over gravel substrates. In dry periods it seeks refuge in bores and semi-permanent waterholes. It mainly feeds on small crustaceans. In permanent waters it breeds from January to March, but will breed opportunistically in flood periods. It is an important component of the diet of many waterbirds such as herons, cormorants and pelicans.
