= Doboatherina aetholepis =

Scientific classification
- Kingdom: Animalia
- Phylum: Chordata
- Class: Actinopterygii
- Order: Atheriniformes
- Family: Atherinidae
- Genus: Doboatherina
- Species: D. aetholepis

Binomial name
- Doboatherina aetholepis Kimura, Iwatsuki & Yoshino, 2002

Synonyms
- Atherinomorus aetholepis

Species of Actinopterygii

Doboatherina aetholepis, also called the spatular-scale silverside, is a species of Old World silverside native to the western Pacific, with a range spanning from Thailand to Papua New Guinea. Its common name derives from characteristic outgrowths on its predorsal and interdorsal scales.
