= Atherinosoma microstoma =

Scientific classification
- Domain: Eukaryota
- Kingdom: Animalia
- Phylum: Chordata
- Class: Actinopterygii
- Order: Atheriniformes
- Family: Atherinidae
- Genus: Atherinosoma
- Species: A. microstoma

Binomial name
- Atherinosoma microstoma (Günther, 1861)

Synonyms
- Atherina microstoma Günther, 1861; Atherinosoma vorax Castelnau, 1872; Atherinichthys modesta Castelnau, 1872; Pranesella endorae Whitley, 1934

Species of fish

Atherinosoma microstoma, commonly known as the small mouth hardyhead, is a species of silverside native to southeastern Australia. It occurs in streams, inland lakes, estuaries and the nearby coastal waters of south-eastern Australia, from Tuggerah Lakes in New South Wales to Lake George in South Australia, as well as in the Bass Strait in Tasmania and Victoria. This species frequently forms schools and they prefer to be among sea grass beds or other aquatic vegetation. This species was described as Atherina microstoma by Albert Günther of the British Museum (Natural History) in 1872 with the type locality given as Tasmania. Francis de LaPorte de Castelnau used the species he had named as Atherinosoma vorax as the type species of the genus he called Atherinosoma but this was a synonym for Günther's Atherina microstoma, which became Atherinosoma microstoma.
