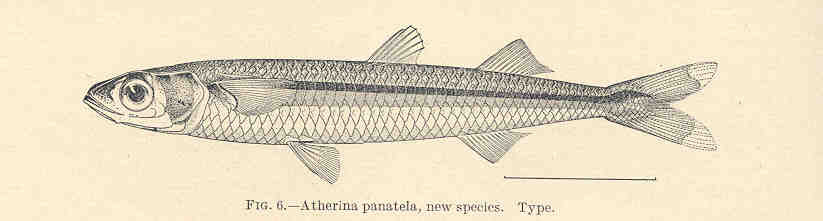

Conservation status
- Least Concern (IUCN 3.1)

Scientific classification
- Kingdom: Animalia
- Phylum: Chordata
- Class: Actinopterygii
- Division: Teleostei
- Order: Atheriniformes
- Family: Atherinidae
- Subfamily: Atherinomorinae
- Genus: Hypoatherina
- Species: H. panatela

Binomial name
- Hypoatherina panatela (D. S. Jordan & R. E. Richardson, 1908)

Synonyms
- Atherina panatela D. S. Jordan & R. E. Richardson, 1908; Stenatherina panatela (D. S. Jordan & R. E. Richardson, 1908)

= Panatela silverside =

Species of fish

The panatela silverside (Hypoatherina panatela) is a species of marine ray-finned fish belonging to the family Atherinomoridae, the tropical silversides. This species is found on reefs in the Western Pacific Ocean.

== Taxonomy ==
The panatela silverside was first formally described as Atherina panatela in 1908 by the American ichthyologists David Starr Jordan and Robert Earl Richardson with Calayan Island in the Philippines given as its type locality. In 1948 Leonard Peter Schultz proposed the new genus, Stenatherina, with its type species identified as Atherina temmincki, however, the type was a misidentfied specimen of the panatela silversides which was, therefore, the only species in this monospecific genus. By 1953 Scultz had reclassified this species into the genus Hypoatherina. The genus Hypoatherina is classified in the family Atherinomoridae, the tropical silverside within the suborder Atherinoidei of the order Atheriniformes, the silversides.. The family Atherinomoridae has been classified as a subfamily of the family Atherinidae, the Atherinomorinae, by some authorities.

== Etymology ==
The panatela silversides is classified in the genus Hypoatherina, this name ass the prefix hypo= meaning "under", to the genus name Atherina, Schultz did not explain what this alluded to but it may be that the anus of the type species, Atherina uisila, is located to the rear of the tips of the pelvic fins. The specific name, panatela is Spanish amd refers to a long thin cigar, this is thought to be an allsuions to the long and slender shape of these fish.

== Description ==
The panatela silversides has an elongated body with an oval cross section which reaches a total length of 11 cm (4.3 in). The dorsal fin has 5-8 spines and 8-10 soft rays while the anal fin has 1 spine and 9-12 soft rays. There is a clear crescent shaped mark on the snout just in front of the eye. The upper part of the midlateral band ends as half crescent on the upper lobe of the caudal fin.

== Distribution and habitat ==
The panatela silversides is found in the Western Pacific where it occurs in Philippines, Palau, New Caledonia, Vanuatu, Fiji, the Phoenix Islands, the Marshall Islands, Pratas Reef in China, Okinawa and Kagoshima Prefectures in Japan, South Sulawesi and Maluku in Indonesia, Tonga, Samoa, Kiribati, the Solomon Islands, northern Australia from Scott Reef, Western Australia to Carter Reef across the northern coast of Australia to the northern Great Barrier Reef, Queensland, as well as reefs in the Coral Sea), Guam, Papua New Guinea, and Tuvalu. This species is found at depths down to 5 m (16 ft) in shallow, coastal waters and rock pools, forming schools, This species is as an important prey item for other fishes.
