= Teramulus kieneri =

Conservation status
- Least Concern (IUCN 3.1)

Scientific classification
- Kingdom: Animalia
- Phylum: Chordata
- Class: Actinopterygii
- Order: Atheriniformes
- Family: Atherinidae
- Genus: Teramulus
- Species: T. kieneri

Binomial name
- Teramulus kieneri J. L. B. Smith, 1965

Species of fish

Teramulus kieneri, the Keiner's silverside or vily, is a species of silverside endemic to Madagascar where it is found in rivers around on the eastern coast. This species was described by J. L. B. Smith in 1965 with the type locality given as the coastal swamps near Tamatave. It has since been found in other areas of the island, including the basin of the Nosivolo River and in the Bemarivo River. Smith gave this species the specific name keineri to honour the French fisheries scientist, André Kiener, who assisted in the collection of the type in 1961, although it was initially reported as Atherinomorus duodecimalis. It is the type species of the genus Teramulus.
