= Atherinosoma elongata =

Scientific classification
- Kingdom: Animalia
- Phylum: Chordata
- Class: Actinopterygii
- Order: Atheriniformes
- Family: Atherinidae
- Genus: Atherinosoma
- Species: A. elongata

Binomial name
- Atherinosoma elongata (Klunzinger, 1879)

Synonyms
- Atherina elongata Klunzinger, 1879; Atherinosoma rockinghamensis Whitley, 1943

Species of fish

Atherinosoma elongata, the elongate hardyhead, is a species of silverside from the family Atherinidae. This species is found in shallow estuaries, sheltered bays, inlets, lagoons and estuaries in southwestern and southern Australia from the Bowes River in Western Australia to Nelson in southwestern Victoria with a gap which runs from Point Demspter in Western Australia and Fowlers Bay, South Australia. This species was described as Atherina elongata in 1879 by Carl Benjamin Klunzinger with a type locality of King George Sound in Western Australia.
