= Atherina lopeziana =

Conservation status
- Data Deficient (IUCN 3.1)

Scientific classification
- Kingdom: Animalia
- Phylum: Chordata
- Class: Actinopterygii
- Order: Atheriniformes
- Family: Atherinidae
- Genus: Atherina
- Species: A. lopeziana

Binomial name
- Atherina lopeziana Rossignol & Blache, 1961

Species of fish

Atherina lopeziana is a species of marine fish of the family Atherinidae. This pelagic-neritic fish grows to 8.0 cm maximal length. Widespread in the eastern Atlantic, it occurs in the Gulf of Guinea to the Bight of Bonny and offshore archipelago and is registered near Cape Verde.
