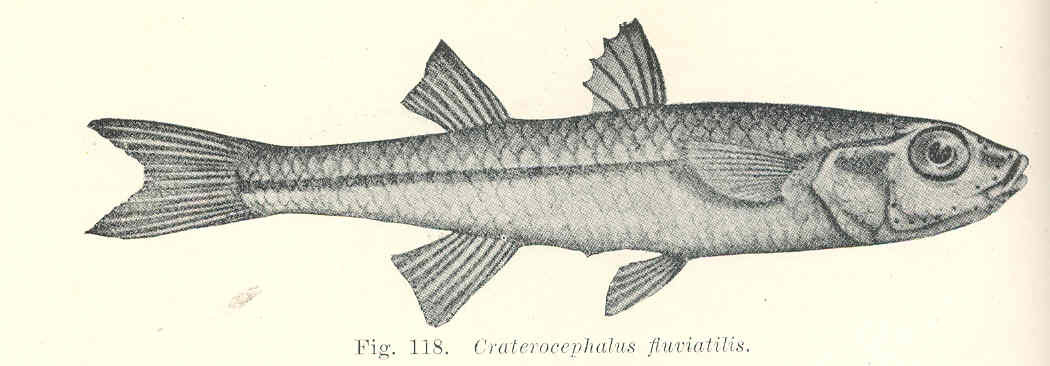
- Craterocephalus fluviatilis

Scientific classification
- Kingdom: Animalia
- Phylum: Chordata
- Class: Actinopterygii
- Order: Atheriniformes
- Family: Atherinidae
- Subfamily: Craterocephalinae; Dyer & Chernoff, 1996

Genera
- See text

= Craterocephalinae =

Subfamily of fishes

Craterocephalinae is a subfamily of silversides from the family, Atherinidae, the Old World silversides. The majority of the species in this subfamily are freshwater fish, although some occur in brackish water. They are found in Australia and New Guinea.

== Genera ==
The subfamily contains the following genera:

- Craterocephalus McCulloch, 1912
- Sashatherina Ivantsoff & Allen, 2011
