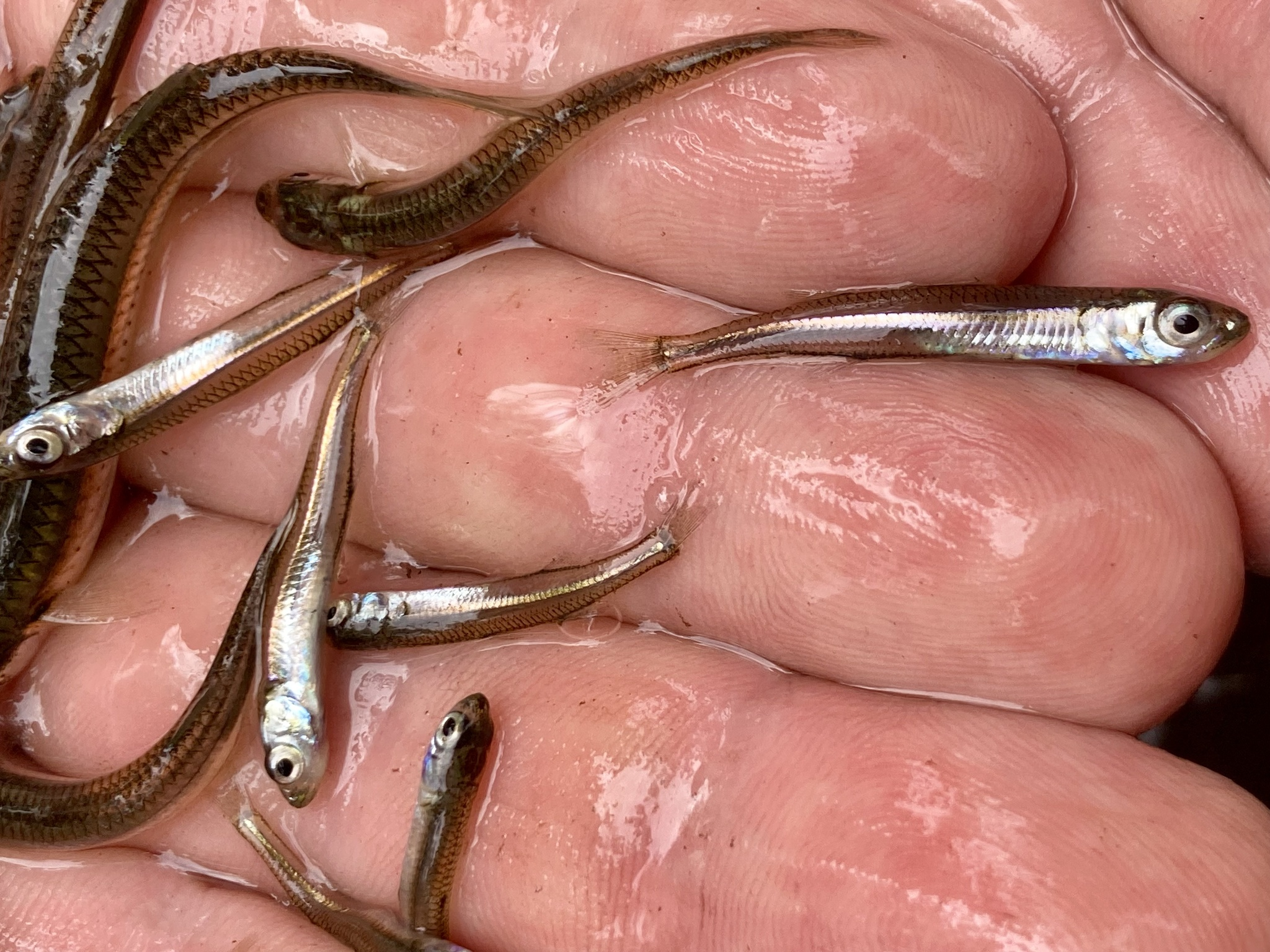
- Leptatherina wallacei

Scientific classification
- Kingdom: Animalia
- Phylum: Chordata
- Class: Actinopterygii
- Order: Atheriniformes
- Family: Atherinidae
- Subfamily: Atherininae
- Genus: Leptatherina; A. Pavlov, Ivantsoff, Last & Crowley, 1988

Type species
- Atherina presbyteroides Richardson, 1843

= Leptatherina =

Genus of fishes

Leptatherina is a genus of silversides, one freshwater and one marine, native to Australia.

== Species ==
The currently recognized species in this genus are:

- Leptatherina presbyteroides (J. Richardson, 1843)
- Leptatherina wallacei (Prince, Ivantsoff & Potter, 1982) (western hardyhead)
