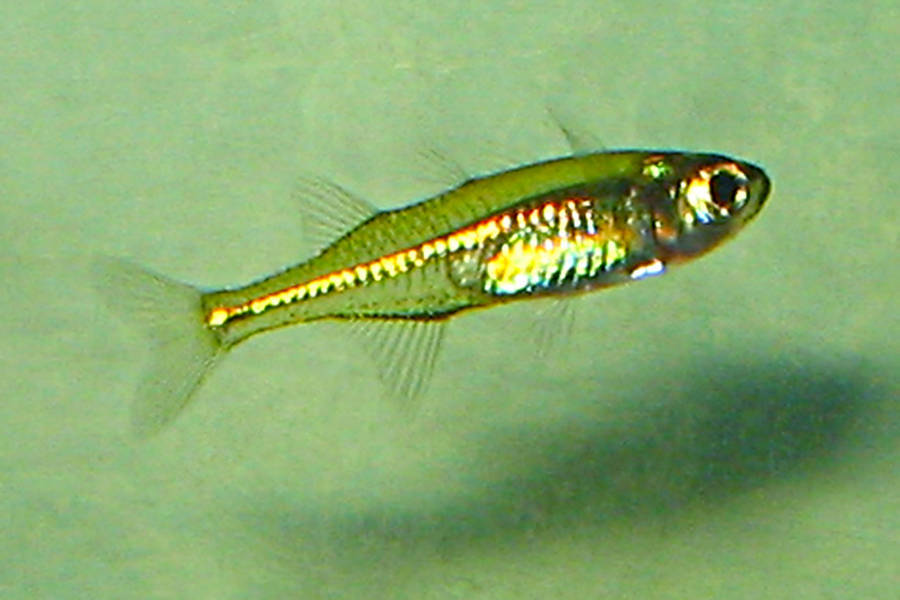

Scientific classification
- Kingdom: Animalia
- Phylum: Chordata
- Class: Actinopterygii
- Order: Atheriniformes
- Family: Atherinidae
- Subfamily: Atherinomorinae
- Genus: Alepidomus; C. L. Hubbs, 1944
- Species: A. evermanni

Binomial name
- Alepidomus evermanni (C. H. Eigenmann, 1903)

Synonyms
- Atherina evermanni Eigenmann, 1903

= Alepidomus =

Genus of fishes

Alepidomus evermanni is a freshwater species of silverside endemic to western Cuba. This species grows to 3.3 cm (1.3 in) in standard length. It is the only known member of its genus. This species was described as Atherina evermanni by Carl H. Eigenmann in 1903 with a type locality of San Cristobal, Cuba. The specific name honours the American ichthyologist Barton Warren Evermann (1853-1932).
