= Finke River hardyhead =

Conservation status
- Near Threatened (IUCN 3.1)

Scientific classification
- Kingdom: Animalia
- Phylum: Chordata
- Class: Actinopterygii
- Order: Atheriniformes
- Family: Atherinidae
- Genus: Craterocephalus
- Species: C. centralis

Binomial name
- Craterocephalus centralis Crowley & Ivantsoff, 1990

Species of fish

The Finke River hardyhead (Craterocephalus centralis) is a species of fish in the family Atherinidae. It is endemic to the Finke River system in the Northern Territory, where it is widespread in open water or around aquatic vegetation. They occur in a wide range of salinity and pH and in Summer seek refuge in semi-permanent water holes. They are omnivores and feed on small crustaceans, insects, gastropods, polychaete worms, algae and fish eggs. This species shows a wide tolerance to temperature and salinity and is omnivore, probably spawning during warmer months. It was previously mis-identified as Craterocephalus eyresii.
