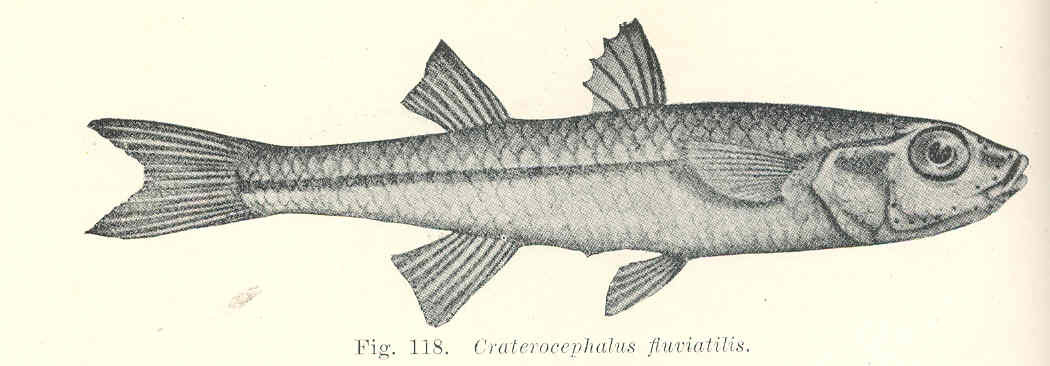

Conservation status
- Critically Endangered (IUCN 3.1)

Scientific classification
- Kingdom: Animalia
- Phylum: Chordata
- Class: Actinopterygii
- Order: Atheriniformes
- Family: Atherinidae
- Genus: Craterocephalus
- Species: C. fluviatilis

Binomial name
- Craterocephalus fluviatilis McCulloch, 1912

= Murray hardyhead =

Species of fish

The Murray hardyhead (Craterocephalus fluviatilis) is a species of fish in the family Atherinidae endemic to inland parts of southeastern Australia. The fish is an omnivore, feeding on small crustaceans, aquatic insects and algae.

It was first proposed as a distinct species by Allan Riverstone McCulloch in 1912. However, throughout much of the 20th century, it was lumped with the Lake Eyre hardyhead under the scientific name Craterocephalus eyresii. Compared to its closest relatives in the Lake Eyre hardyhead species complex, which inhabit remote desert rivers, the Murray hardyhead is found in more easily-accessible habitat. Consequently, it was the only member of the complex that was comprehensively studied, but most of these studies called it C.eyresii. It was only since the 1990s that its distinctness from that taxon was finally understood, and McCulloch's name re-validated.

== Conservation ==
The fish was once widespread and abundant in the Murray and Murrumbidgee River systems in southern NSW and northern Victoria. However, they have suffered a serious population decline and now seem to be limited to a few sites, mainly in northern Victoria. There are very few recent records of Murray hardyheads from NSW.

The main threat to remaining populations is increasing salinity and lack of water.

Murray hardyheads are now listed as an endangered species in NSW and threatened in Victoria. There are heavy penalties for harming, possessing, buying, or selling them.

They are listed as endangered by the Australian Federal Government Department of Climate Change, Energy, the Environment and Water under the EPBC Act.
