= Kailola's hardyhead =

Conservation status
- Critically Endangered (IUCN 3.1)

Scientific classification
- Kingdom: Animalia
- Phylum: Chordata
- Class: Actinopterygii
- Division: Teleostei
- Order: Atheriniformes
- Family: Atherinidae
- Genus: Craterocephalus
- Species: C. kailolae

Binomial name
- Craterocephalus kailolae Ivantsoff, Crowley & G. R. Allen, 1987

Species of fish

Kailola's hardyhead (Craterocephalus kailolae) is a species of fish in the family Atherinidae endemic to Papua New Guinea. It reaches a maximum length of 6 cm. It inhabits shallow, clear creeks with gravel substrate. This species was described by Walter Ivantsoff, Lucy Crowley and Gerald R. Allen in 1987 with a type locality of a still backwater of Foasi Creek 3 kilometers west of Safia airstrip in Papua New Guinea. The specific name honours Patricia J. Kailola for her contribution to the knowledge of the ichthyology of Papua New Guinea.
