= Darling River hardyhead =

Conservation status
- Least Concern (IUCN 3.1)

Scientific classification
- Kingdom: Animalia
- Phylum: Chordata
- Class: Actinopterygii
- Order: Atheriniformes
- Family: Atherinidae
- Genus: Craterocephalus
- Species: C. amniculus

Binomial name
- Craterocephalus amniculus Crowley & Ivantsoff, 1990

Species of fish

The Darling River hardyhead (Craterocephalus amniculus) is a species of fish in the family Atherinidae endemic to Australia. The species name amniculus is from the Latin meaning a small creek or stream, in reference to the habitat where these fish are often found.

Craterocephalus amniculus is recorded to be vulnerable to becoming an endangered species because of its restricted range, but the threats and information regarding this recording have not been verified or documented.

== Description ==
The Darling River hardyhead is a small, laterally compressed fish that has a slender and elongated body. The large eyes are silvery in colour and it has narrow lips with few teeth in the mouth. The back is a dusky gold colour while it is silvery gold below. There is a dark, silvery stripe that runs the length of the flanks. They attain a maximum length of 55 millimetres (2.2 in). This species has two small, dorsal fin which have short bases and with the second positioned directly over the anal fin. The caudal fin is forked and the pectoral fins are located high on the body while the anal fin has 5–8 rays. It has small scales that infrequently overlap and there is a count of 37–38 along the midlateral with a transverse count of 14–18 scales. Normally there are no scales on top of head, although sometimes small and circular may be present. The mouth is protractile but its gape is restricted by a ligament situated about a third of the way along the mouth.

== Distribution ==
The Darling River hardyhead occurs in the northern section of the Murray-Darling basin where it inhabits the upper tributaries of the River Darling in the border area between Queensland and New South Wales. Within the Murray-Darlin basin this species has been recorded from the Condamine, Peel, Namoi, Macintyre and Cockburn rivers and in Boiling Down and Warialda Creeks. This is a disjunct distribution and the presence of Un-specked hardyheads seems to exclude this species. Where it does occur it is reported to be relatively common. In the catchment of the Hunter River the Darling River hardyhead occurs between 50 and 330 metres (160 and 1,080 ft).

== Habitat and biology ==
The Darling River hardyhead occurs in slow-flowing, clear, shallow rivers and streams or among the aquatic vegetation at the margins of these waters. It will also occur in faster currents such as those that are found where a deeper pool drains. Their life history is almost unknown but small juvenile specimens have been collected in September. It has been reported to occur solitarily or in schools which can be formed of more than fifty fishes. In the Macintyre River, spawning seems to run from September to February. What is known is that they form pairs to spawn and after mating the females lay the eggs among aquatic vegetation.

Breeding and spawning occurs in the middle of summer.

They are omnivorous with the bulk of their diet consisting of algae and insect larvae but gastropods, small crustaceans, worms and the eggs of fish have all been recorded as being consumed by this species.

== Conservation ==
The Darling River hardyhead is threatened by habitat degradation associated with agriculture and damaging factors include soil erosion, land clearance, the clearing of riverside vegetation, erosion of riverbanks caused by livestock, flood management and water abstraction. It is also threatened by introduced fish species such as mosquitofish (Gambusia holbrooki), goldfish, common carp and rainbow trout, the latter often stocked.

== Taxonomy ==
The Darling River hardyhead was previously misidentified as Craterocephalus eyresii and was not described until 1990 when Lucy Crowley and Walter Ivantsoff published a description of this species from a type locality of Cockburn River, Nemingha, New South Wales. The populations of similar hardyheads in the Hunter catchment have been provisionally assigned to this species but may, on further investigation, prove to be a different species.
