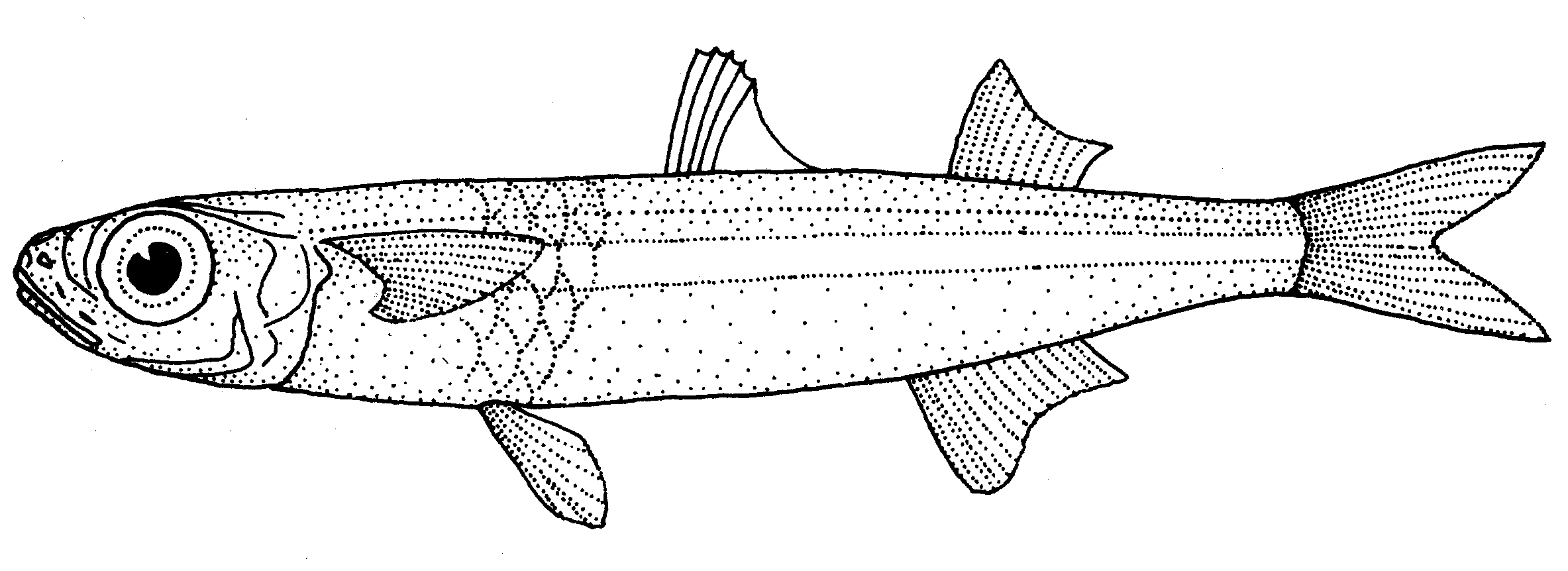
- Atherinomorus lacunosus

Scientific classification
- Kingdom: Animalia
- Phylum: Chordata
- Class: Actinopterygii
- Order: Atheriniformes
- Family: Atherinidae
- Subfamily: Atherinomorinae
- Genus: Atherinomorus; Fowler, 1903

Type species
- Atherina laticeps, a synonym of Atherinomorus stipes Poey, 1860

Synonyms
- Pranesus Whitley, 1930; Thoracatherina Fowler, 1941

= Atherinomorus =

Genus of fishes

Atherinomorus is a genus of silversides in the family Atherinidae. They are found across the Indo-Pacific and one species in the western Atlantic ocean.

== Species ==
There are currently 9 recognized species in this genus:

- Atherinomorus crenolepis (Schultz, 1953) (crenulated silverside)
- Atherinomorus endrachtensis (Quoy & Gaimard, 1825) (Eendracht Land silverside)
- Atherinomorus forskalii (Rüppell, 1838) (Red Sea hardyhead silverside)
- Atherinomorus insularum (D. S. Jordan & Evermann, 1903) (Hawaiian Islands silverside)
- Atherinomorus lacunosus (J. R. Forster, 1801) (Wide-banded hardyhead silverside)
- Atherinomorus pinguis (Lacépède, 1803) (Narrow-banded hardyhead silverside)
- Atherinomorus regina (Seale, 1910) (Culion silverside)
- Atherinomorus stipes (J. P. Müller & Troschel, 1848) (Hardhead silverside)
- Atherinomorus vaigiensis (Quoy & Gaimard, 1825) (Ogilby's hardyhead silverside)

Synonyms

- Atherinomorus lineatus (Günther, 1872); valid as Atherinomorus endrachtensis (Quoy & Gaimard, 1825) (Lined silverside)
