= Pima hardyhead =

Conservation status
- Data Deficient (IUCN 3.1)

Scientific classification
- Kingdom: Animalia
- Phylum: Chordata
- Class: Actinopterygii
- Order: Atheriniformes
- Family: Atherinidae
- Genus: Craterocephalus
- Species: C. pimatuae

Binomial name
- Craterocephalus pimatuae Crowley, Ivantsoff & G. R. Allen, 1991

Species of fish

The Pima hardyhead (Craterocephalus pimatuae) is a species of silverside in the family Atherinidae which is endemic to Papua New Guinea. This species was described in 1991 by Walter Ivantsoff, Lucy Crowley and Gerald R. Allen with the type locality given as the junction of Pima and Tua rivers. It has not been recorded since the collection of the types.
