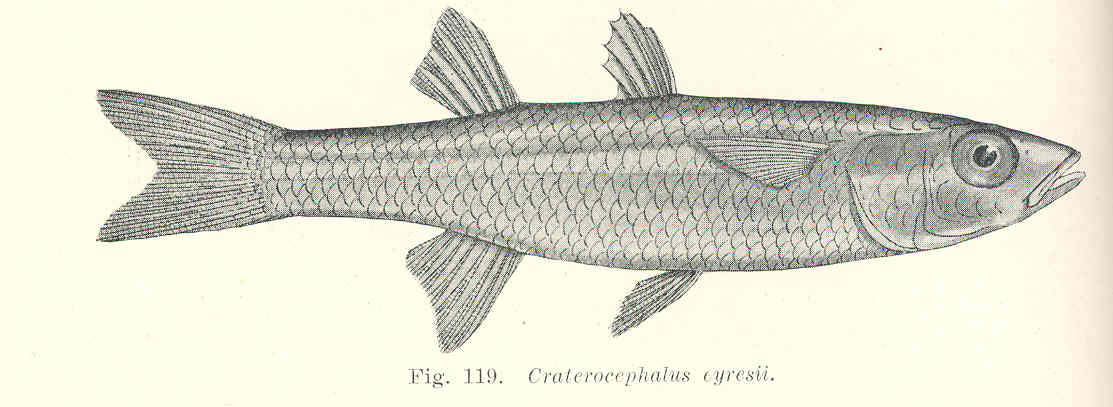
- Craterocephalus eyresii

Scientific classification
- Domain: Eukaryota
- Kingdom: Animalia
- Phylum: Chordata
- Class: Actinopterygii
- Order: Atheriniformes
- Family: Atherinidae
- Subfamily: Craterocephalinae
- Genus: Craterocephalus; McCulloch, 1912

Type species
- Craterocephalus fluviatilis McCulloch, 1912

Species
- See text

Synonyms
- Allanetta Whitley, 1943; Quirichthys Whitley, 1951; Quiris Whitley, 1950

= Craterocephalus =

Genus of fishes

Craterocephalus is a genus of small and slender brackish or freshwater silversides from Australia and New Guinea. It is the most diverse genus in the family Atherinidae, containing 25 of the 71 species.

== Species ==
The currently recognized species in this genus are:

- Craterocephalus amniculus Crowley & Ivantsoff, 1990 (Darling River hardyhead)
- Craterocephalus capreoli Rendahl (de), 1922 (Rendahl's hardyhead)
- Craterocephalus centralis Crowley & Ivantsoff, 1990 (Finke River hardyhead)
- Craterocephalus cuneiceps Whitley, 1944 (Murchison River hardyhead)
- Craterocephalus dalhousiensis Ivantsoff & Glover, 1974 (Dalhousie hardyhead)
- Craterocephalus eyresii (Steindachner, 1883) (Lake Eyre hardyhead)
- Craterocephalus fistularis Crowley, Ivantsoff & G. R. Allen, 1995
- Craterocephalus fluviatilis McCulloch, 1912 (Murray hardyhead)
- Craterocephalus fulvus Ivantsoff, Crowley & Allen, 1987 (Unspecked hardyhead)
- Craterocephalus gloveri Crowley & Ivantsoff, 1990 (Glover's hardyhead)
- Craterocephalus helenae Ivantsoff, Crowley & G. R. Allen, 1987 (Drysdale hardyhead)
- Craterocephalus honoriae (J. D. Ogilby, 1912) (estuarine hardyhead)
- Craterocephalus kailolae Ivantsoff, Crowley & G. R. Allen, 1987 (Kailola's hardyhead)
- Craterocephalus lacustris Trewavas, 1940 (Kutubu hardyhead)
- Craterocephalus laisapi Larson, Ivantsoff & Crowley, 2005
- Craterocephalus lentiginosus Ivantsoff, Crowley & G. R. Allen, 1987 (Prince Regent hardyhead)
- Craterocephalus marianae Ivantsoff, Crowley & G. R. Allen, 1987 (Magela hardyhead)
- Craterocephalus marjoriae Whitley, 1948 (Marjorie's hardyhead)
- Craterocephalus mugiloides (McCulloch, 1912) (spotted hardyhead)
- Craterocephalus munroi Crowley & Ivantsoff, 1988 (Munro's hardyhead)
- Craterocephalus nouhuysi (M. C. W. Weber, 1910) (mountain hardyhead)
- Craterocephalus pauciradiatus (Günther, 1861) (few-ray hardyhead)
- Craterocephalus pimatuae Crowley, Ivantsoff & G. R. Allen, 1991 (Pima hardyhead)
- Craterocephalus randi Nichols & Raven, 1934 (Kubuna hardyhead)
- Craterocephalus stercusmuscarum (Günther, 1867)
- Craterocephalus stramineus (Whitley, 1950) (blackmast or strawman)
