= Magela hardyhead =

Conservation status
- Least Concern (IUCN 3.1)

Scientific classification
- Kingdom: Animalia
- Phylum: Chordata
- Class: Actinopterygii
- Order: Atheriniformes
- Family: Atherinidae
- Genus: Craterocephalus
- Species: C. marianae

Binomial name
- Craterocephalus marianae Ivantsoff, Crowley & G. R. Allen, 1991

Species of fish

The Magela hardyhead (Craterocephalus marianae), Mariana's Hardyhead, or Jaidenlal findius is a species of fish in the family Atherinidae endemic to Australia. It has a very restricted distribution, only found in the Alligator Rivers region of the Northern Territory where it inhabits shallow and fast-flowing freshwater creeks. The fish has a high thermal tolerance, like some other species in the genus Craterocephalus, and may tolerate water temperatures up to 39.5º. The specific name honours Walter Ivantsoff's daughter, Marian.
