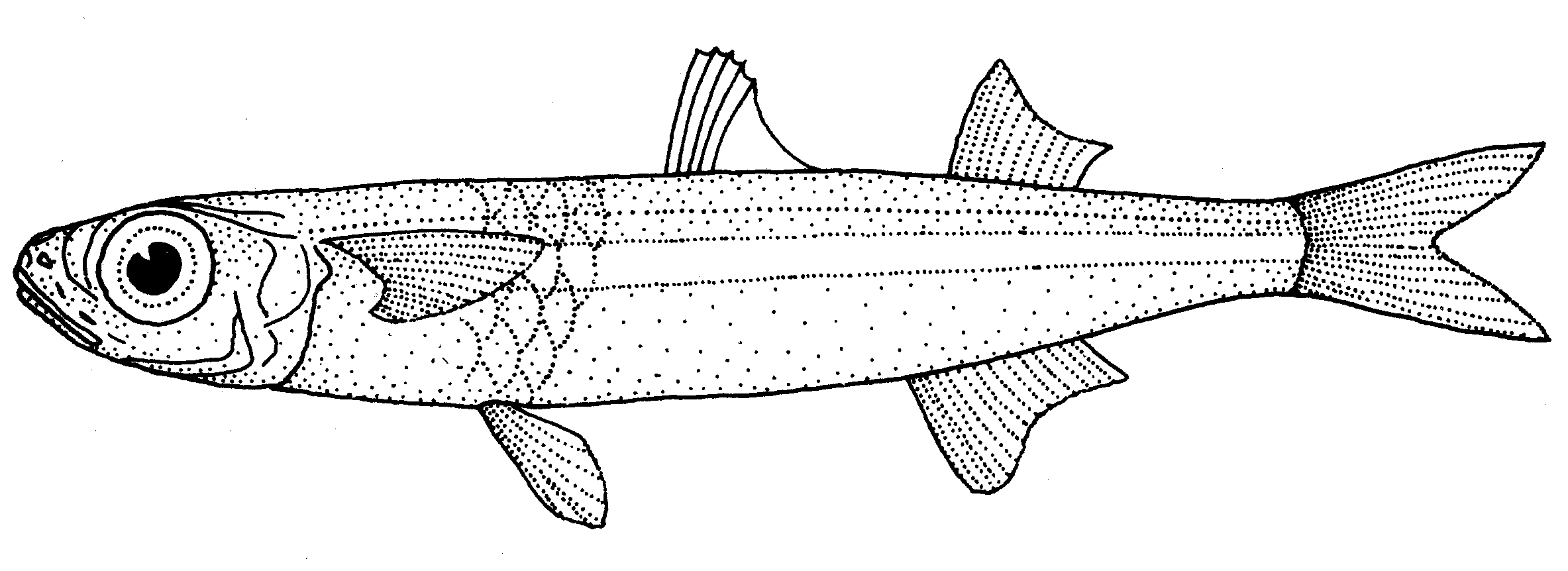

Conservation status
- Least Concern (IUCN 3.1)

Scientific classification
- Kingdom: Animalia
- Phylum: Chordata
- Class: Actinopterygii
- Division: Teleostei
- Order: Atheriniformes
- Family: Atherinidae
- Genus: Atherinomorus
- Species: A. lacunosus

Binomial name
- Atherinomorus lacunosus (J. R. Forster, 1801)

Synonyms
- Atherina lacunosa Forster, 1801; Atherinomorus lacunosa (Forster, 1801); Pranesus lacunosus (Forster, 1801); Atherina affinis Bennett, 1832; Atherina punctata Bennett, 1833; Atherina morrisi Jordan & Starks, 1906; Atherion morrisi (Jordan & Starks, 1906); Hepsetia morrisi (Jordan & Starks, 1906); Pranesus morrisi (Jordan & Starks, 1906); Pranesus capricornensis Woodland, 1961; Atherinomorus capricornensis (Woodland, 1961); Pranesus maculatus Taylor, 1964

= Hardyhead silverside =

Species of fish

The hardyhead silverside (Atherinomorus lacunosus), also known as the broad-banded hardyhead, broad-banded silverside, Capricorn hardyhead, pitted hardyhead, robust hardyhead, robust silverside, slender hardyhead and wide-banded hardyhead silverside, is a silverside of the family Atherinidae. It occurs in the Indo-Pacific near the surface as well as in the Mediterranean, having invaded as a Lessepsian migrant through the Suez Canal.

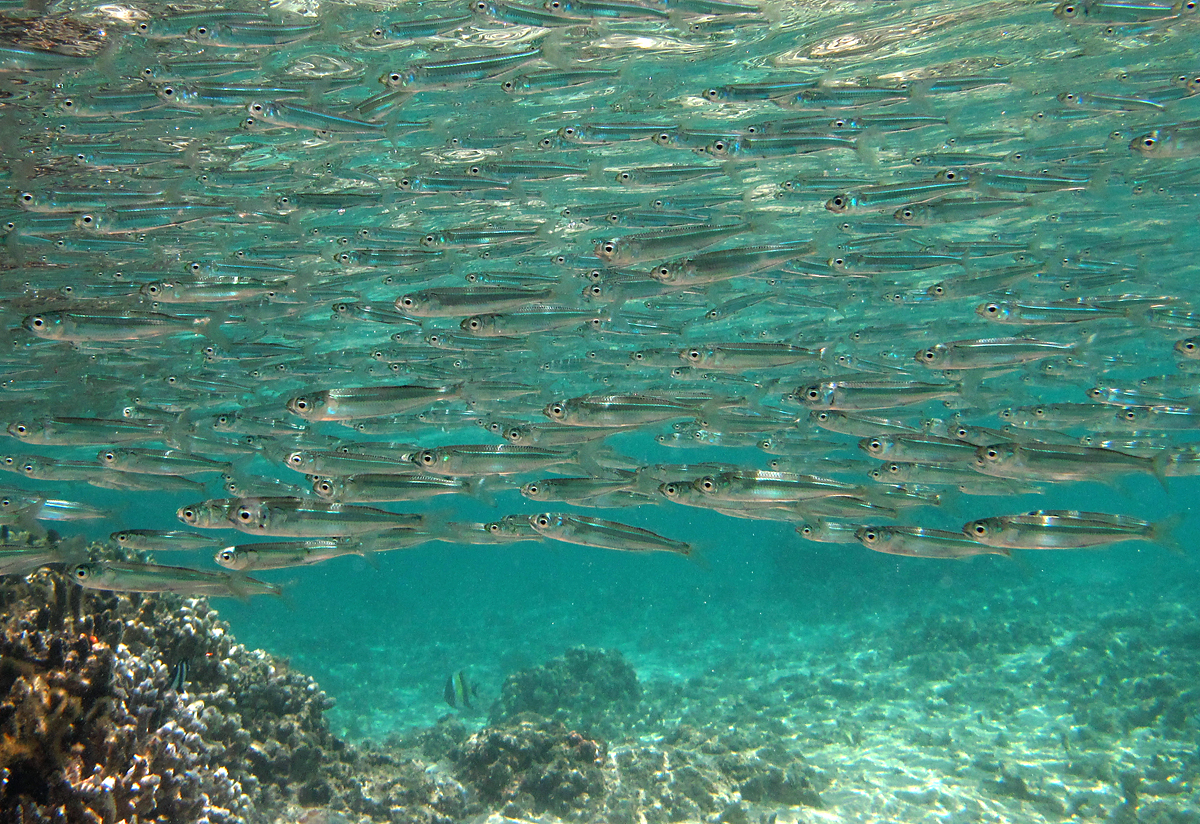
A bank of young Atherinomorus lacunosus.

== Description ==
The hardyhead silverside is a robust, broad headed, small fish which is distinguished by having a very low and wide lateral process of premaxilla with the upper margin of the anterior bone of the lower jaw which bears the teeth is almost flat distally and has no distinct tubercle at its posterior end. The posterior of the jaw reaches at least as far as the vertical through anterior margin of the pupil. The mouth has small teeth on palate which do not form obvious ridges. The anus is usually behind but close to the posterior tip of the pelvic fin. There are 18–24 lower gill rakers and the midlateral scale count is 40–44. The lower edge of the midlateral band reaches below the ventral end of the third scale row and nearly extends to the center of the fourth scale row where it is level with the origin of the anal fin. The dorsal fin has 5–8 spines and 9–10 soft rays while the anal fin has 1 spine and 12–17 soft rays and it has 43–44 vertebrae. They can grow up to 14 cm (5.5 in) but are more usually in the range 10–12 cm (3.9–4.7 in). Freshly caught specimens are overall silvery in colour, tending to greenish on the dorsal area but with a bright blue strip along the flank, dusky fins and a translucent appearance when seen live in the water.

== Distribution ==
The hardyhead silverside has an Indo-Pacific distribution which extends from the eastern coasts of Africa east to Tonga, north as far as southern Japan, and south to northern Australia; it appears to be absent in the Andaman Sea and to be replaced by Atherinomorus insularum in Hawaii. It was the second species of Red Sea creature, following Pampus argenteus, to be recorded in the Mediterranean Sea following the opening of the Suez Canal in 1869, being reported by Tillier in 1902 and had spread north westwards as far as Greece.

== Biology ==
The hardyhead silverside occurs commonly in large schools along sandy shorelines and reef margins. It is reported to be a largely nocturnal fish which forms schools numbering from several hundred individuals to aggregations which may be over 100 m (330 ft) long and 20 m (66 ft) wide. Feeds on a wide variety of plankton and small benthic invertebrates with foraging taking place mostly during the night following the dispersal of the schools. It can also be found in estuarine waters.

In New Caledonia, hardyhead silversides attain sexual maturity just before they reach a year old, spawning from late August through to December. The species has a relatively low fecundity and this combined with the extended spawning season suggests that this species utilises a spawning strategy which involves each individual female spawning a number of times. They have a short lifespan and most normally die after the spawning season although some individuals survived into their second year. However, in the Seychelles there were two spawning seasons, in April–June and in September–December, which corresponded to the periods of warmer water between the monsoons while in the Marshall Islands spawning occurred all year. In South Africa spawning has been observed near estuaries and takes place from October to January. The eggs bear fine filaments which are used to adhere the eggs to the substrate or to other submerged surfaces.

The hardyhead silverside is an important forage fish for larger fish species such as sharks, tunas, needlefish and amberjacks which capture them by associating with and attacking the day schools. They are also preyed on by sea birds such as terns, boobies, gulls, egrets and herons. It also plays host to parasites such as the cymothoid isopod Livoneca and the trematodes Overstreetia cribbi and O. sodwanaensis.

== Uses ==
The hardyhead silversides is sold fresh, or salted and dried in Asia and is referred to a whitebait in some English speaking parts of the world where it occurs.

== Taxonomy and naming ==
Atherinomorus lacunosus has been lumped with A. forskalli and A. pinguis in the past but is now regarded as separate, although this has caused some confusions as to whether the species which has invaded the Mediterranean is A. lacunosus or A. forskalli. More recent DNA studies have shown that this species, and other species in the genus Atherinomorus, are actually made up of a number of cryptic species and that the populations identified as A. lacunosus in the Red Sea and Mediterranean may represent three such species.

The name Atherinomorus lacunosus means the hollow bearing (lacunosis) smelt (Atherinomorus), while the common name refers to its robust head and silvery flanks.
