= Bleheratherina pierucciae =

Scientific classification
- Kingdom: Animalia
- Phylum: Chordata
- Class: Actinopterygii
- Order: Atheriniformes
- Family: Atherinidae
- Subfamily: Bleheratherininae; Aarn & Ivantsoff 2009
- Genus: Bleheratherina; Aarn & Ivantsoff, 2009
- Species: B. pierucciae

Binomial name
- Bleheratherina pierucciae Aarn & Ivantsoff, 2009

Species of fish

Bleheratherina pierucciae is a species of freshwater silverside endemic to New Caledonia. This species grows to 4.7 cm (1.9 in) in standard length. It is the only known species in its genus and subfamily. This species was described by Aarn and Walter Ivantsoff in 2009 with the type locality of the Tontouta River, New Caledonia,. The type was collected by Heiko Bleher and Paola Pierucci and Aarn and Ivantsoff named this species after both of them, the suffix -ae indicating Ms Pierucci's gender.
