= Teramulus =

Scientific classification
- Kingdom: Animalia
- Phylum: Chordata
- Class: Actinopterygii
- Order: Atheriniformes
- Family: Atherinidae
- Subfamily: Atherinomorinae
- Genus: Teramulus; J. L. B. Smith, 1965

Type species
- Teramulus kieneri Smith, 1965

Genus of fishes

Teramulus is a genus of fresh and brackish water fishes in the family Atherinidae endemic to Madagascar.

== Species ==
The currently recognized species in this genus are:

- Teramulus kieneri J. L. B. Smith, 1965 (Kiener's silverside)
- Teramulus waterloti (Pellegrin, 1932)
