= Kestratherina =

Scientific classification
- Kingdom: Animalia
- Phylum: Chordata
- Class: Actinopterygii
- Order: Atheriniformes
- Family: Atherinidae
- Subfamily: Atherininae
- Genus: Kestratherina; A. Pavlov, Ivantsoff, Last & Crowley, 1988

Type species
- Atherinichthys esox Klunzinger, 1872

Genus of fishes

Kestratherina is a genus of silversides endemic to the eastern Indian Ocean off southern Australia.

== Species ==
The currently recognized species in this genus are:

- Kestratherina brevirostris (A. Pavlov, Ivantsoff, Last & Crowley, 1988) (short-snout hardyhead)
- Kestratherina esox (Klunzinger, 1872) (pikehead hardyhead)
