= Drysdale hardyhead =

Conservation status
- Near Threatened (IUCN 3.1)

Scientific classification
- Kingdom: Animalia
- Phylum: Chordata
- Class: Actinopterygii
- Order: Atheriniformes
- Family: Atherinidae
- Genus: Craterocephalus
- Species: C. helenae

Binomial name
- Craterocephalus helenae Ivantsoff, Crowley & G. R. Allen, 1987

Species of fish

The Drysdale hardyhead (Craterocephalus helenae) is a species of fish in the family Atherinidae endemic to the Drysdale River in the Kimberley region of Australia. It is listed as near threatened on the IUCN Red List and rare under the Australian EPBC Act 1999. The specific name honours Ivantsoff's wife, Helena.

Little is known about the biology or ecology of this species, but it is an omnivore which feeds on aquatic insects, small crustaceans and algae.
