= Kutubu hardyhead =

Conservation status
- Endangered (IUCN 3.1)

Scientific classification
- Kingdom: Animalia
- Phylum: Chordata
- Class: Actinopterygii
- Order: Atheriniformes
- Family: Atherinidae
- Genus: Craterocephalus
- Species: C. lacustris

Binomial name
- Craterocephalus lacustris Trewavas, 1940

Species of fish

The Kutubu hardyhead (Craterocephalus lacustris) is a species of fish in the family Atherinidae. It is endemic to Lake Kutubu and its outlet, the Soro River, in the Kikori River system, Papua New Guinea. Within its range this species is extremely abundant and large schools may be formed in the shallow margins of the lake, both in open water and among the aquatic vegetation. This species was described by Ethelwynn Trewavas in 1940.
