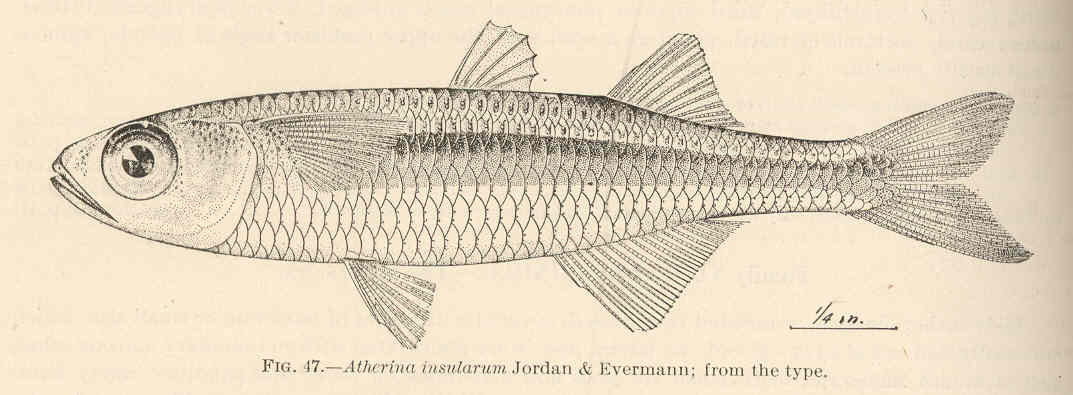

Scientific classification
- Kingdom: Animalia
- Phylum: Chordata
- Class: Actinopterygii
- Order: Atheriniformes
- Family: Atherinidae
- Genus: Atherinomorus
- Species: A. insularum

Binomial name
- Atherinomorus insularum (Jordan & Evermann, 1903)

= Atherinomorus insularum =

Species of fish

Atherinomorus insularum also called Hawaiian silverside or 'iao in Hawaiian is a species of fish in the family Atherinidae endemic to Hawaii.

== Description and biology ==
The Hawaiian silverside has two dorsal fins and a prominent lateral stripe, which sets them apart from other baitfish. They can grow up to three and a half inches. They are greenish gray on the back and have a silvery stripe topped by a blue-green line running the length of the body. They disperse to feed on plankton at the surface at night.

== Distribution and habitat ==
Atherinomorus insularum are endemic to Hawaii. They are a common schooling fish often found near the surface in tidepools and coastal waters.

== Human use and cultural significance ==
In ancient Hawaii, these fish were sometimes used to rub the face of a human sacrificial victim to make it shine like the eyes of a maneater shark.
