= Atherinosoma =

Scientific classification
- Kingdom: Animalia
- Phylum: Chordata
- Class: Actinopterygii
- Order: Atheriniformes
- Family: Atherinidae
- Subfamily: Atherininae
- Genus: Atherinosoma; Castelnau, 1872

Type species
- Atherinosoma vorax Castelnau, 1872

Genus of fishes

Atherinosoma is a genus of silversides from the coastal waters of south-eastern Australia.

== Species ==
The currently recognized species in this genus are:

- Atherinosoma elongata (Klunzinger, 1879) (elongated hardyhead)
- Atherinosoma microstoma (Günther, 1861) (small-mouth hardyhead)
