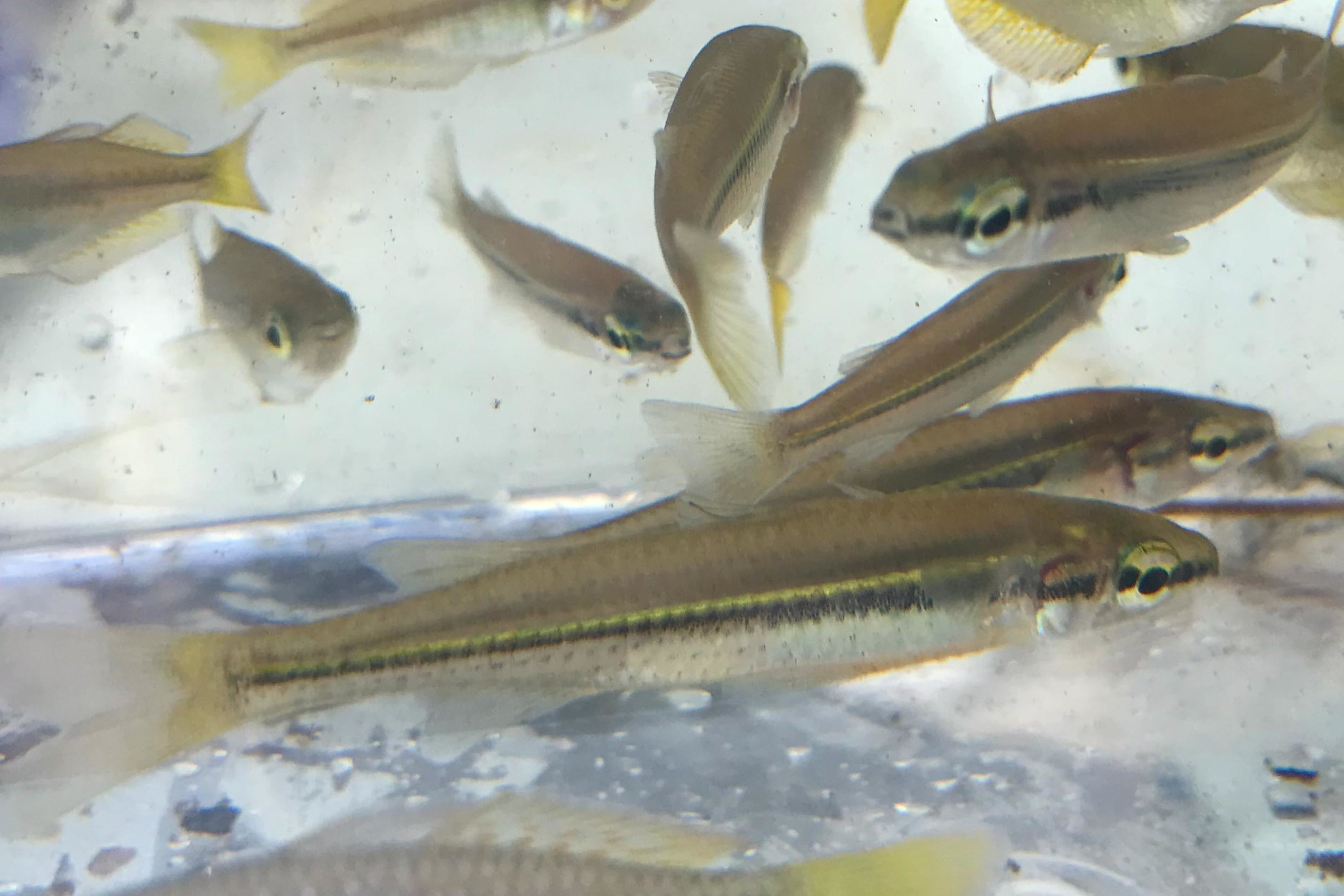

Conservation status
- Least Concern (IUCN 3.1)

Scientific classification
- Kingdom: Animalia
- Phylum: Chordata
- Class: Actinopterygii
- Order: Atheriniformes
- Family: Atherinidae
- Genus: Craterocephalus
- Species: C. stercusmuscarum

Binomial name
- Craterocephalus stercusmuscarum (Günther, 1867)

Synonyms
- Atherina stercusmuscarum Günther, 1867; Atherinichthys maculatus Macleay, 1883; Craterocephalus worrelli Whitley, 1948

= Fly-specked hardyhead =

Species of fish

The fly-specked hardyhead (Craterocephalus stercusmuscarum) is a species of fish in the family Atherinidae endemic and widespread in the freshwater streams of the Northern Territory down the east coast of Queensland into southern Queensland. It forms shoals in streams' shallows (both slow flowing and fast flowing). It grows up to 10 cm (usually 5–6 cm) in length.

The Australian Museum has a sample taken from the Annan River in its ichthyology collection. The Museum describes the species as follows:

"The flyspecked hardyhead has a slender body covered with black dots. This pattern gave rise to the common name. The fish is golden yellow to deep green above, changing to white below. A dusky to silver stripe runs from the snout to the caudal peduncle."

"The flyspecked hardyhead eats mainly mosquito larvae and aquatic insects. It will also eat crustaceans and has been observed eating algae in aquaria. It can be easily kept in aquaria but its natural colours often fade."

== Reproduction ==
Breeding and spawning occurs in October to February. Males gain a bright yellow or gold belly for the occasion. Females deposit large, transparent eggs onto aquatic plants. Larvae 4.8–6.4 mm long hatch after 13 days.
