= Craterocephalus lentiginosus =

Conservation status
- Least Concern (IUCN 3.1)

Scientific classification
- Kingdom: Animalia
- Phylum: Chordata
- Class: Actinopterygii
- Order: Atheriniformes
- Family: Atherinidae
- Genus: Craterocephalus
- Species: C. lentiginosus

Binomial name
- Craterocephalus lentiginosus Ivantsoff, Crowley & G. R. Allen, 1987

Species of fish

Craterocephalus lentiginosus, the freckled hardyhead is a species of fish in the family Atherinidae endemic to the Kimberley region in the northwest of Australia. It is also called the Prince Regent hardyhead.

This fish was first described in 1987. It has been found in variety of habitats, brackish pools or flowing to turgid waters, in the Upper Roe River and one of its tributaries. The distribution range is within the Prince Regent National Park (formerly the Prince Regent Nature Reserve). Little is known about the biology or ecology of the freckled hardyhead, but it is an omnivore.

== Conservation ==
The species was assessed as least concern on the Red List. It is listed as rare under the Australian Environment Protection and Biodiversity Conservation Act 1999 and as lower rish by the Australian Society for Fish Biology.
