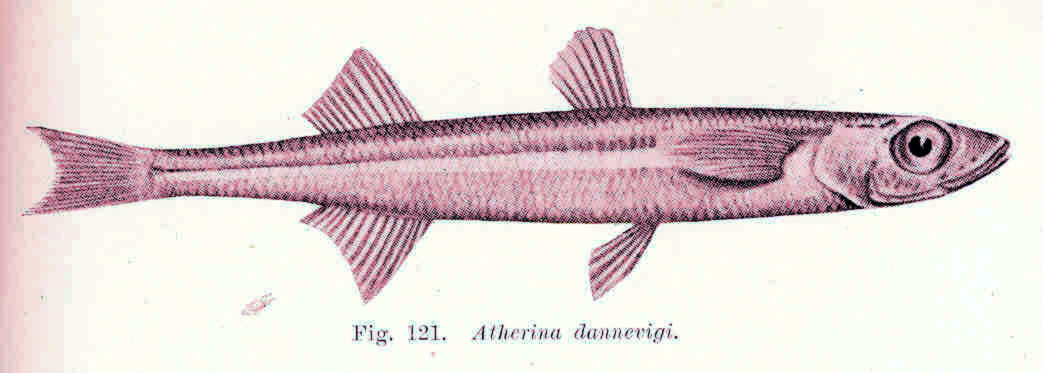

Scientific classification
- Kingdom: Animalia
- Phylum: Chordata
- Class: Actinopterygii
- Order: Atheriniformes
- Family: Atherinidae
- Genus: Atherinason; Whitley, 1934
- Species: A. hepsetoides

Binomial name
- Atherinason hepsetoides (J. Richardson, 1843)

Synonyms
- Atherina hepsetoides Richardson, 1843; Atherina dannevigi McCulloch, 1911

= Smallscale hardyhead =

Species of fish

The smallscale hardyhead (Atherinason hepsetoides) is a species of silverside endemic to the Indian Ocean off the southern coast of Australia. This species grows to 9.0 cm (3.5 in) in total length. It is the only known member of its genus.
