= Glover's hardyhead =

Conservation status
- Vulnerable (IUCN 2.3)

Scientific classification
- Kingdom: Animalia
- Phylum: Chordata
- Class: Actinopterygii
- Order: Atheriniformes
- Family: Atherinidae
- Genus: Craterocephalus
- Species: C. gloveri

Binomial name
- Craterocephalus gloveri Crowley & Ivantsoff, 1990

Species of fish

Glover's hardyhead (Craterocephalus gloveri) is a species of fish in the family Atherinidae endemic to Dalhousie Springs in the Lake Eyre basin, Australia. The fish has a high thermal tolerance and inhabits warm, freshwater spring-fed pools and channels. It is listed as vulnerable on the IUCN Red List. The specific name honours John Glover (1935–1992) who was the Curator of Fishes at the South Australian Museum.
