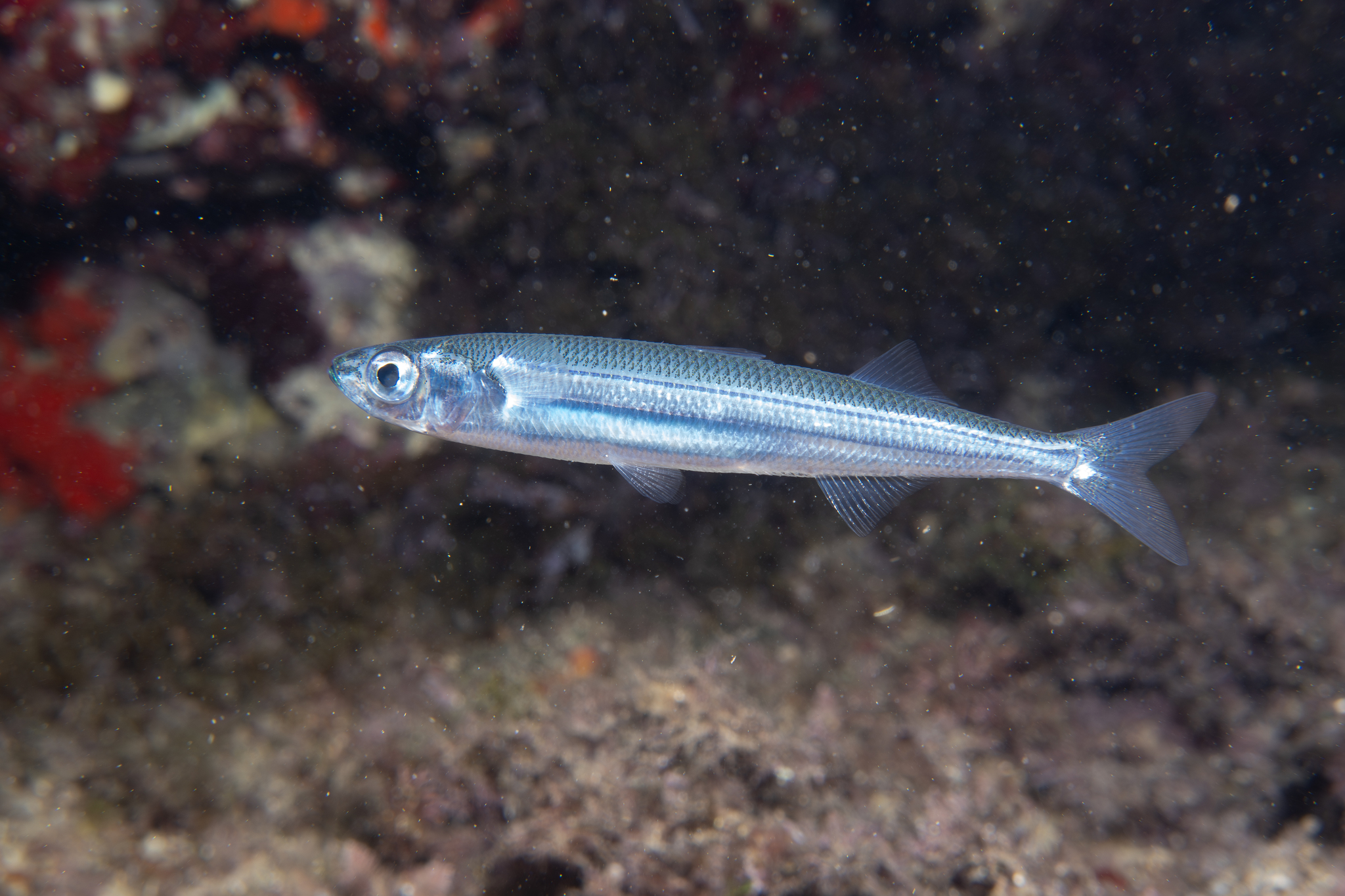
- Mediterranean sand smelt

Conservation status
- Least Concern (IUCN 3.1)

Scientific classification
- Kingdom: Animalia
- Phylum: Chordata
- Class: Actinopterygii
- Division: Teleostei
- Order: Atheriniformes
- Family: Atherinidae
- Genus: Atherina
- Species: A. hepsetus

Binomial name
- Atherina hepsetus Linnaeus, 1758

= Mediterranean sand smelt =

Species of fish

The Mediterranean sand smelt, Atherina hepsetus, is a species of fish in the family Atherinidae that inhabits the littoral zone of the east Atlantic, the Mediterranean and the Black Sea.

== Description ==
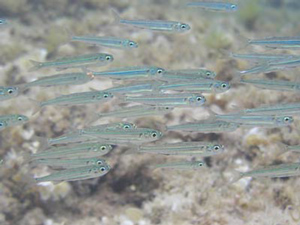
Atherina hepsetus

The body is rather long, slender and moderately flattened. The mouth is protrusible, directed upward with small teeth; the head and body are scaly.

The lower jaw has an upper expansion within the mouth (high dentary bone).

Two separate dorsal fins, all rays of first and 1–2 anterior rays of second dorsal fin are unsegmented, with the remaining rays segmented. The anal fin is similar to the second dorsal fin, while the caudal fin is forked. Body is silverish white, darker on the back, with the light blue horizontal stripe extending to the tail.

The maximum size is up to 20 cm (7.9 in) in length.

Although rather small, as a carnivorous species, it feeds on pelagic copepods and benthic crustaceans.

In the Mediterranean, it spawns from December to May.

== Habitat and distribution ==
It is a pelagic-neritic, brackishwater / marine fish, widespread in the eastern Atlantic coasts of Spain and Morocco including Madeira and the Canary Islands. It is also found in the Mediterranean, Adriatic and Black Seas.

== Fishing ==
The major small-scale fishing gears exploiting this species are the various coastal beach seines, small mesh size (10 mm (0.39 in)) gill nets and lift-nets. Rarely it can be caught on very small hook, baited with small chunks of fish meat. Live Mediterranean sand smelt is excellent bait for many predatory species that feed on this gregarious fish.

== Cuisine ==
The meat is mostly deep fried with larger specimens sometimes prepared as part of mixed fish stew or soup.

== Feeding ==
All Atherina species are carnivorous. They often school near riverbanks where they feed on worms, mollusks, larvae, and crustaceans.
