= Doboatherina =

Scientific classification
- Kingdom: Animalia
- Phylum: Chordata
- Class: Actinopterygii
- Division: Teleostei
- Order: Atheriniformes
- Family: Atherinidae
- Subfamily: Atherinomorinae
- Genus: Doboatherina; Sasaki & Kimura, 2019

Species
- See text

Genus of fish

Doboatherina is a genus of fish in the family Atherinidae: the Old World silversides . They can be found in the tropical habitats of Indian and Pacific ocean. This genus contains 11 species:

- Doboatherina aetholepis (Kimura, Iwatsuki & Yoshino, 2002) (spatular-scale silverside)
- Doboatherina balabacensis (Seale, 1910) (Balabac Island silverside)
- Doboatherina bleekeri (Günther, 1861)
- Doboatherina duodecimalis (Valenciennes, 1835) (tropical silverside)
- Doboatherina iwatsukii Sasaki, Kimura & Satapoomin, 2019
- Doboatherina magnidentata Sasaki, Kimura, Satapoomin & Nguyen, 2019
- Doboatherina palauensis Kimura, Takeda, Gotoh & Hanzawa, 2020
- Doboatherina salangensis Sasaki, Kimura & Satapoomin, 2019
- Doboatherina valenciennei (Bleeker, 1854) (Sumatran silverside)
- Doboatherina woodwardi (Jordan & Starks 1901)
- Doboatherina yoshinoi Sasaki & Kimura, 2019
