= Sashatherina =

Scientific classification
- Kingdom: Animalia
- Phylum: Chordata
- Class: Actinopterygii
- Division: Teleostei
- Order: Atheriniformes
- Family: Atherinidae
- Genus: Sashatherina; Ivantsoff & G. R. Allen, 2011
- Species: S. giganteus

Binomial name
- Sashatherina giganteus Ivantsoff & G. R. Allen, 2011

Species of fish

Sashatherina giganteus is a species of freshwater silverside endemic to Lake Lakama in West Papua, Indonesia. It grows to 18.0 cm (7.1 in) in total length. This recently described species is the only known member of its genus.
