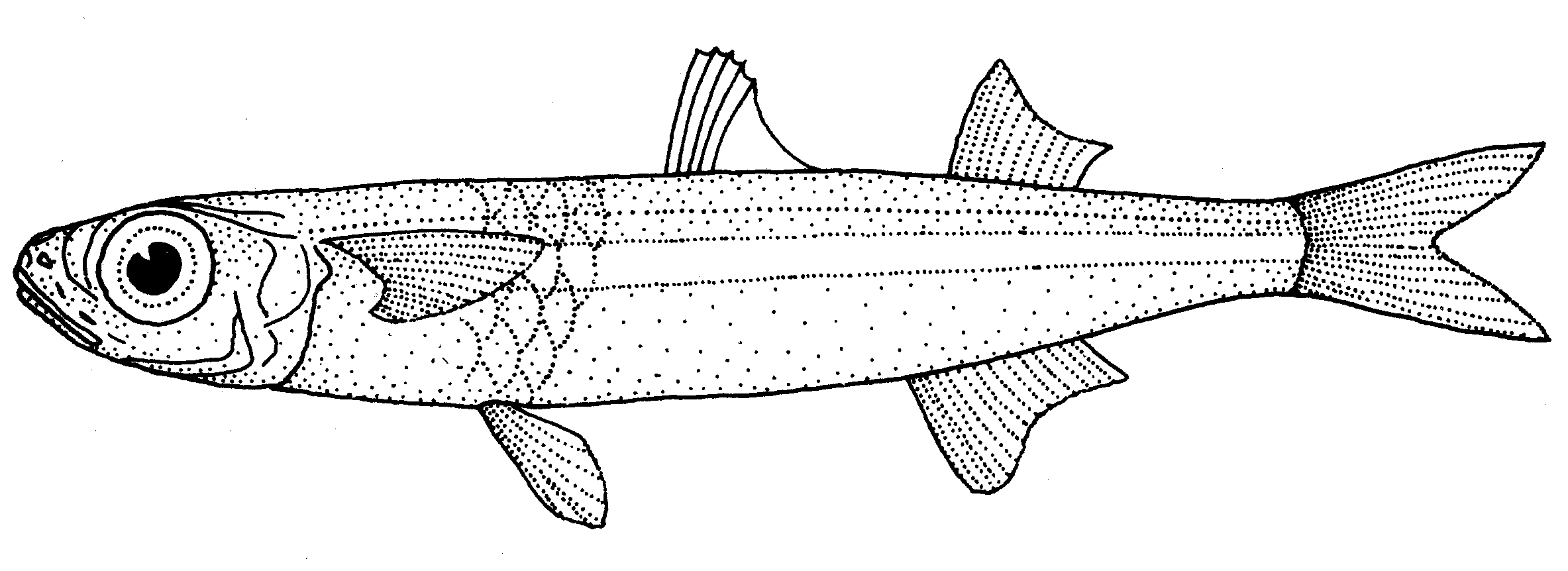
- Atherinomorus lacunosus

Scientific classification
- Kingdom: Animalia
- Phylum: Chordata
- Class: Actinopterygii
- Order: Atheriniformes
- Family: Atherinidae
- Subfamily: Atherinomorinae; Dyer & Chernoff 1996

= Atherinomorinae =

Subfamily of fishes

Atherinomorinae is a subfamily of silversides from the family, Atherinidae, the Old World silversides.

== Genera ==
The subfamily contains the following genera:

- Alepidomus C. L. Hubbs, 1944 (monotypic)
- Atherinomorus Fowler, 1903 (9 species)
- Doboatherina Sasaki & Kimura, 2019 (between 3 and 8 species)
- Hypoatherina Schultz, 1948 (either 13 or 15 species)
- Stenatherina Schultz, 1948 (monotypic)
- Teramulus J. L. B. Smith, 1965 (2 species)
