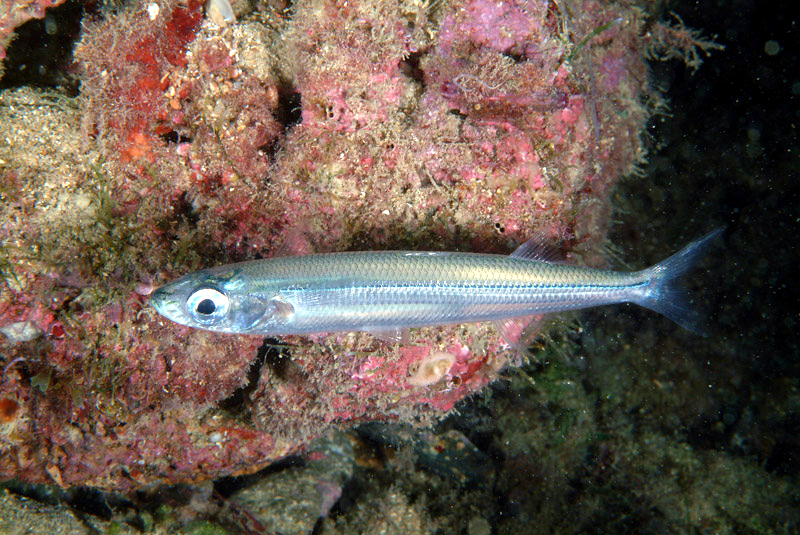
- Atherina hepsetus

Scientific classification
- Kingdom: Animalia
- Phylum: Chordata
- Class: Actinopterygii
- Order: Atheriniformes
- Family: Atherinidae
- Subfamily: Atherininae
- Genus: Atherina; Linnaeus, 1758

Type species
- Atherina hepsetus Linnaeus, 1758

= Atherina =

Atherina Temporal range: Eocene - Holocene

Genus of fish

Atherina is a genus of fish of silverside family Atherinidae, found in the temperate and tropic zones. Up to 15 cm (5.9 in) long, they are widespread in the Mediterranean, Black Sea and Sea of Azov; in lagoons such as Syvash in Ukraine; and estuaries. They enter the lower reaches of the Dnieper, Southern Bug, Dniester and Danube Rivers. They can also be found in the freshwater Lake Trichonis of Greece, and there is an isolated population in the Caspian Sea.

== Species ==
There are currently seven recognized species in this genus:

- Atherina boyeri A. Risso, 1810 (Big-scale sand smelt)
- Atherina breviceps Valenciennes, 1835 (Cape silverside)
- Atherina caspia Eichwald, 1831
- Atherina harringtonensis Goode, 1877
- Atherina hepsetus Linnaeus, 1758 (Mediterranean sand smelt)
- Atherina lopeziana Rossignol & Blache, 1961
- Atherina presbyter G. Cuvier, 1829 (Sand smelt)

== Commercial importance ==
Species of Atherina feature in the traditional Italian, Catalan, Occitan, south-Ukrainian, Turkish, and Greek cuisines in fried form. The fish are lightly powdered with wheat flour before being dropped in hot olive oil. In Ukraine and Greece, it is commercially important.

== Fossil record ==
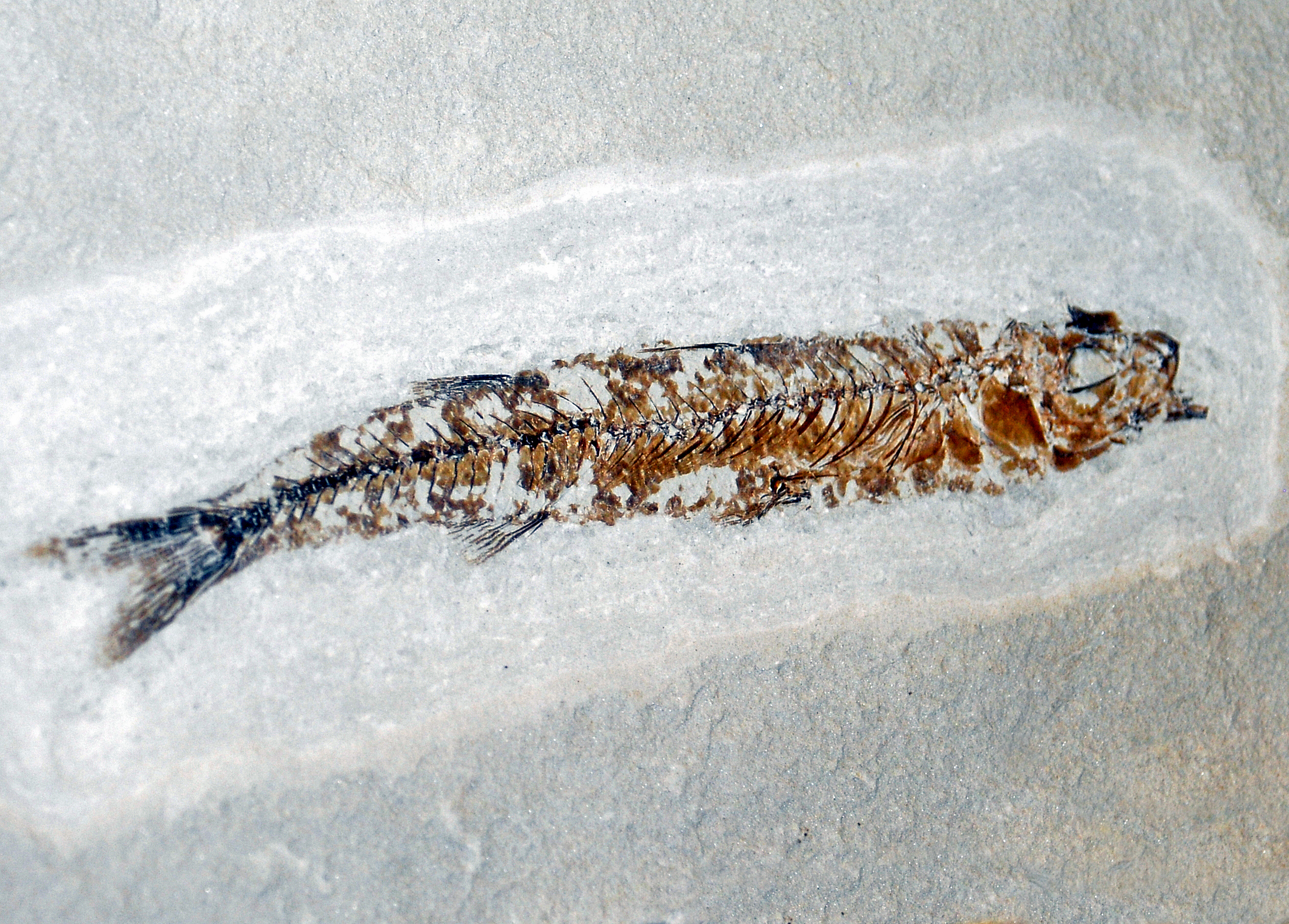
Fossil of Atherina cavalloi

- Atherina austriaca - Badenian of Czechia (Mikulov) : 13.82 - 12.8 mya
- Atherina atropatiensis - Tortonian of Iran
- Atherina cavalloi - Messinian of Italy (Emilia-Romagna)
- Atherina gidjakensis - Serravallian of Kazakhstan
- Atherina macrocephala - Ypresian of Italy
- Atherina suchovi - Sarmatian of Moldova : 12.8 - 11.63 mya

Also, fossils of the extant Atherina boyeri have been found at several sites in Italy (Tuscany) and the Greek Islands of Rhodes and Crete, dating back as far as the Messinian.
