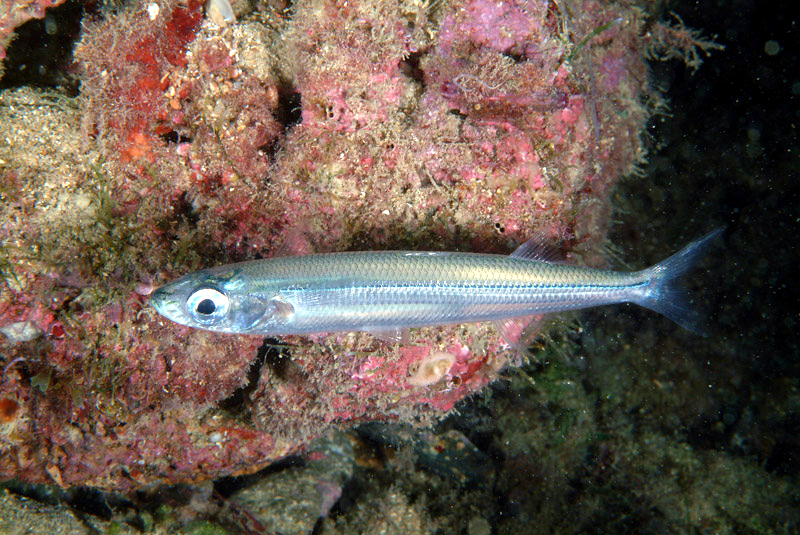
- Atherina hepsetus

Scientific classification
- Kingdom: Animalia
- Phylum: Chordata
- Class: Actinopterygii
- Division: Teleostei
- Order: Atheriniformes
- Suborder: Atherinoidei
- Family: Atherinidae; Risso, 1827

Sub-families
- see text

= Old World silverside =

Old World silverside Temporal range: 50–0 Ma

Family of fishes

The Old World silversides are a family, Atherinidae, of fish in the order Atheriniformes. Atherinidae are abundant and considered bony fish (teleost) that are widespread globally, living in rivers, estuaries, and coastal waters. They occur worldwide in tropical and temperate waters. About two-thirds of the species are marine, and the remainder live in fresh water. The 74 species are in 13 genera. The genus Craterocephalus is the most diverse with 25 species. Four genera are monotypic.

Silversides are relatively small with most being less than 20 cm (7.9 in) in length, with several not attaining lengths of more than 5 cm (2.0 in). The body is generally elongated. Distinctive characters include two dorsal fins widely separated, with the first consisting of flexible spines and the second having one spine followed by soft rays, while the anal fin has one spine on the leading edge followed by soft rays. The pectoral fins tend to be high, and there is no lateral line. On the flanks is a broad, silvery band. The scales are relatively large.

They feed on zooplankton. Some species, such as the hardyhead silverside, Atherinomorus lacunosus, are commercially fished.

The family Atherinopsidae (Neotropical silversides) is closely related, while the genus Atherion has been given family status in the Atherionidae by some authorities.

== Subfamilies and genera ==
With reference to the 5th edition of Fishes of the World and the 2020 introduction of the genus Doboatherina, the family should be classified as follows:

- Subfamily Atherininae Risso, 1827
  - Atherina Linnaeus, 1758 (7 species)
  - Atherinason Whitley, 1934 (monotypic)
  - Atherinosoma Castelnau, 1872 (2 species)
  - Kestratherina A. Pavlov, Ivantsoff, Last & Crowley, 1988 (2 species)
  - Leptatherina Pavlov, Ivantsoff, Last & Crowley, 1988 (2 species)
- Subfamily Atherinomorinae Dyer & Chernoff, 1996
  - Alepidomus C. L. Hubbs, 1944 (monotypic)
  - Atherinomorus Fowler, 1903 (9 species)
  - Doboatherina Sasaki & Kimura, 2019 (10 species)
  - Hypoatherina Schultz, 1948 (15 species)
  - Stenatherina Schultz, 1948 (monotypic)
  - Teramulus J. L. B. Smith, 1965 (2 species)
- Subfamily Bleheratherininae Aarn & Ivantsoff, 2009
  - Bleheratherina Aarn & Ivanstoff, 2009 (monotypic)
- Subfamily Craterocephalinae Dyer & Chernoff, 1996
  - Craterocephalus McCulloch, 1912 (26 species)
  - Sashatherina Ivantsoff & Allen, 2011 (monotypic)

The oldest known Old World silverside is "Atherina" macrocephala Agassiz, 1835 from the Early Eocene-aged Monte Bolca site of Italy. The fossil genus †Hemitrichas Peters, 1877 contains multiple species commonly found in late Eocene to early Miocene fossil deposits of Europe.

== Subfamily Craterocephalinae ==
=== Origin and characteristics of genus Craterocephalus ===
In the silverside family Atherinidae, the genus Craterocephalus is the only one containing primarily freshwater species and is the most speciose. It is also the only genus that experienced high levels of radiation in freshwater ecosystems. Overall, there are twenty-five species, of which twenty are freshwater organisms and five are marine fish found only in Australian coastal waters. Within the genus, numerous species live in Australia's freshwater ecosystems, specifically, 18 species live in Australia, 6 in New Guinea, and 1 in East Timor. How Craterocephalus diverged from being marine water organisms is linked to the ancestors of Craterocephalinae and Atherininae, where both subfamilies lived in similar environments but were separated by a north–south disjunction around Australia. The separation caused one lineage to remain in Northern Australia, forming the genus Craterocephalus, which developed distinct characteristics from the other subfamily Atherininae. Since all of Atherinidae are primarily marine, Craterocephalus is most likely also of marine origin.

Freshwater fish in the genus Craterocephalus are found in various ecosystems, such as rivers, rainforest streams, creeks, and hot desert springs. Characteristics of the fish include having short life spans that are 2–3 years long, and their body length ranges from 5–10 cm. Maturity is reached when fish are 3–5 cm in length, and most species spawn shortly after one year of being born. Spawning rates increase in the spring and continue to be high in the summer — typically, one fish releases 85 eggs daily. Species in this genus are tolerant of environments differing in salt concentrations and temperature, especially C. eyresii and C. cuneiceps. Both these species can tolerate 70–100 ppm of salt, while C. dalhousiensis can withstand high water temperatures up to 42 °C.

The genus is split into five groups: "eyresii", "stercusmuscarum", "new honoriae", "capreoli", and "stramineus". Two groups, "eyresii" and "stercusmuscarum", are mainly found in Australian freshwaters. The majority of the fish in the "new honoriae" are marine organisms found in the Northern area of Australia, and their habitat slightly overlaps with the habitat of fish in the subfamily Atherininae. After the formation of the Craterocephalus, the "new honoriae" group established itself in Northern Australia's marine environments, while the other groups invaded freshwater habitats.

=== Species within Craterocephalus ===
Craterocephalus stercusmuscarum is an Australian freshwater fish of marine origin that has moderate dispersal potential. The species is abundant in the Wet Tropics of Northern Australia and travels long distances upland to areas near waterfalls.

== Subfamily Atherininae ==
=== Origin of Atherininae ===
The separation between the ancestors of Craterocephalinae and Atherininae caused Atherininae lineage to form in Southern Australia, which has cooler habitats than Northern Australia. The subfamily Atherininae has five genera. One is Atherina, which is found near the Eastern Atlantic and Mediterranean oceans; however, the remaining four are restricted to Australia's southern coastal waters. Since Atherina's biogeographic location is significantly different, it is likely that Atherina and the four genera are not monophyletic or do not descend from a common ancestor. Instead, Atherina is hypothesized to have a sister lineage with the ancestors of Atherininae and the Craterocephalinae.

=== Species within genus Atherina ===
Atherina boyeri is found in estuaries, coastal waters, lagoons, salt marshes, and brackish water ecosystems; therefore, this species is euryhaline or can tolerate different levels of salinity. The fish is typically located in the Mediterranean seas but is also found in the northeast and northwest Atlantic. A. boyeri is a commercial fish in Greece, where the fishing period begins in February but only lasts a few weeks. In Greece, this species is found in the Mesolongi and Etolikon lagoons. The maximum length observed for females and males that were three years old was 103 mm and 83.1 mm, respectively. Rapid growth is seen during the first year of life, specifically, fish reach about 66% of their adult size after one year. However, the fish experience a 20% decrease in length after one year, and a 15% decrease in length in their third year. Their lifespan typically ranges from 1-to 3 years. Both males and females have a single gland for their gonads. Young females have white ovaries, but as they mature, their ovaries are covered with peritoneum and darken to black. Males testis do not experience any changes and are white. Sexual maturity is reached two or three months after their birth, and the GSI value of the fish begins to increase early in the year and reaches its maximum ratio in May, indicating that the reproductive period begins in March and ends in June. Females have larger GSI values than males. The reproductive period is extensive and lasts about five months. In terms of the sex ratio, there are slightly more females than males in the population. The sex ratio between males and females is approximately 1:1.2.

Atherina hepsetus is found in marine and brackish waters across the Eastern Atlantic coasts and can swim between 5 and 20 meters in depth. Their diet includes zooplankton and benthic crustaceans. In the Mediterranean, this species is an important commercial fish that is also a food source for other commercial fish. The approximate length for females males is 12.07 cm and 11.83 cm, respectively. The average weight of both sexes is 6 grams, while the maximum age is about four years. Additionally, the ratio between females and males is about 1.3:1. In terms of growth, the fish significantly increase in length and weight during their first year of life, with females reaching a length of 11.3 cm and males reaching 11.15 cm. Maturation also begins after one year; however, after sexual maturation, both sexes' growth rate decreases. Spawning rates increase in March and fall down after April. During the spawning season, the GSI value of males is larger than females, but the mass of the female gonads is slightly greater than their male counterparts.

=== Species within genus Atherinosoma ===
Atherinosoma elongata is found in Australia's south-western estuaries and ranges from 40 to 78 mm in length. Fish are usually bigger in size during the summer months than winter months. The lifespan of this species is about one year, so the fish grow significantly during their first months of life. When sexual maturity is reached, females are about 68.9 mm in length while males are 54 mm. The gonadosomatic index (GSI) for both males and females increases after August and remains high until December, indicating their breeding period is around these months.

=== Species within genus Leptatherina ===
Two species of Leptatherina (L. presbyteroides and L. wallacei) are located in South-Western Australia. L. presbyteroides is a primarily marine species that can also live in estuaries and L. wallacei is found in both estuary and inland waters.

Leptatherina presbyteroides have a lifespan of one year, and its length ranges from 25 to 75 mm. Specifically, females are about 69.1 mm while males are 59.1 mm in length when they reach sexual maturity. Smaller fish are present throughout the year, which means that breeding occurs over a long period of time. This species primarily lives in estuaries, so their breeding occurs there, but as the fish mature, they travel to the ocean and spawn there. Spawning begins from August to November due to the GSI of the fish being significantly high in both males and females. However, younger fish have their GSI relatively high during April and May, indicating that spawning may occur in the Spring.

Leptatherina wallacei has a lifespan of one year, and its length ranges from 25 to 50 mm; females are longer than males. When sexual maturity is reached, females have an average length of 54.8 mm, and males have an approximate length of 44.7 mm. Additionally, the number of larger fish decreases during November and December while the number of smaller fish increases, indicating that the spawning period of this species begins in the Spring and mortality begins later in the year.
