= B. tricolor =

B. tricolor may refer to:

- Bedotia tricolor, a fish species endemic to Madagascar
- Bulbophyllum tricolor, an orchid species

== See also ==
- Tricolor (disambiguation)
