= Bedotia masoala =

Conservation status
- Vulnerable (IUCN 3.1)

Scientific classification
- Kingdom: Animalia
- Phylum: Chordata
- Class: Actinopterygii
- Order: Atheriniformes
- Family: Bedotiidae
- Genus: Bedotia
- Species: B. masoala

Binomial name
- Bedotia masoala Sparks, 2001

Species of fish

Bedotia masoala is a species of rainbowfish in the subfamily Bedotiinae. It is endemic to Madagascar. Its natural habitat is rivers. It is threatened by habitat loss. This species was described in 2001 by John S. Sparks from a type locality of the Ankavanana River on the Masoala Peninsula in Antalaha District.
