= Rheocles sikorae =

Conservation status
- Data Deficient (IUCN 3.1)

Scientific classification
- Kingdom: Animalia
- Phylum: Chordata
- Class: Actinopterygii
- Order: Atheriniformes
- Family: Bedotiidae
- Genus: Rheocles
- Species: R. sikorae

Binomial name
- Rheocles sikorae (Sauvage, 1891)

Synonyms
- Eleotris sikorae Sauvage, 1891; Atherina sikorae (Sauvage, 1891)

Species of fish

Rheocles sikorae is a species of rainbowfish in the subfamily Bedotiinae, the Madagascar rainbowfishes. It is endemic to Madagascar where found in tropical rivers and streams. It can reach the maximum recorded length of 11.5 cm (4.5 in).

== Distribution and status ==
Rheocles sikorae is native to Madagascar, where found in the Mangoro stream, high valley of the east coast of the island, and in the Manambola River near Anosibe.

At one point in time, this species was thought to be extinct, but since 1996 it has been collected from five forested stream localities near the town of Marolambo.

== Taxonomy and name ==
Rheocles sikorae was described by Henri Émile Sauvage in 1891 as Eleotris sikorae with a type locality given as "Madagascar". Sauvage honoured the Austrian explorer Franz Sikora (1863-1902), who collected the type.
