= Rheocles vatosoa =

Conservation status
- Endangered (IUCN 3.1)

Scientific classification
- Kingdom: Animalia
- Phylum: Chordata
- Class: Actinopterygii
- Order: Atheriniformes
- Family: Bedotiidae
- Genus: Rheocles
- Species: R. vatosoa

Binomial name
- Rheocles vatosoa Stiassny, D. M. Rodríguez & Loiselle, 2002

Species of fish

Rheocles vatosoa is a species of rainbowfish in the subfamily Bedotiinae, the Madagascar rainbowfishes. It is endemic to Madagascar. Its natural habitat is the Lokoho River basin. It is threatened by habitat loss.
