= Rheocles pellegrini =

Conservation status
- Data Deficient (IUCN 3.1)

Scientific classification
- Kingdom: Animalia
- Phylum: Chordata
- Class: Actinopterygii
- Division: Teleostei
- Order: Atheriniformes
- Family: Bedotiidae
- Genus: Rheocles
- Species: R. pellegrini

Binomial name
- Rheocles pellegrini (Nichols & La Monte, 1931)

Synonyms
- Rheocloides pellegrini Nichols & La Monte, 1932

Species of fish

Rheocles pellegrini is a species of rainbowfish from the subfamily Bedotiinae. It is endemic to Madagascar. Its natural habitat is rivers. This species was described by John Treadwell Nichols and Francesca Raimonde La Monte in 1931 from a type collected "one day west of Andapa." by Austin L. Rand and P. A. DuMont who were part of the "Archbold Expedition" to Madagascar of 1929–1931. R. pellegrini was not then recorded until the 21st century when populations were found in the area of the type locality. The specific name honours the French ichthyologist Jacques Pellegrin (1873–1944).
