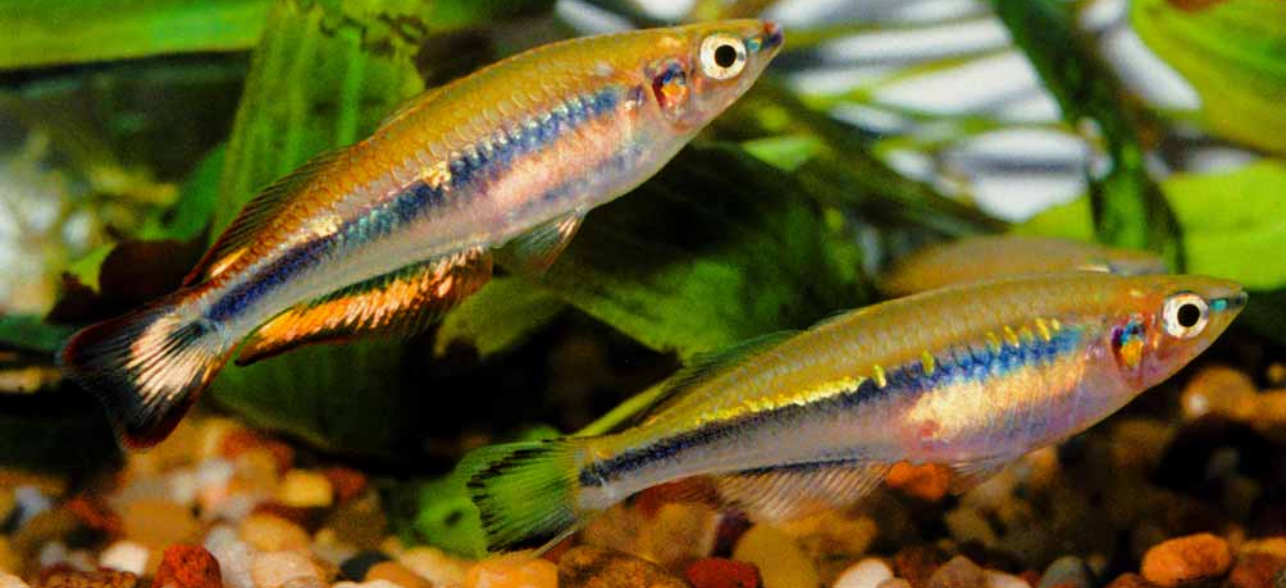

Conservation status
- Endangered (IUCN 3.1)

Scientific classification
- Kingdom: Animalia
- Phylum: Chordata
- Class: Actinopterygii
- Order: Atheriniformes
- Family: Bedotiidae
- Genus: Bedotia
- Species: B. madagascariensis

Binomial name
- Bedotia madagascariensis Regan, 1903

= Bedotia madagascariensis =

Species of fish

Bedotia madagascariensis (known locally as zona) is a species of ray-finned fish in the family Bedotiidae. As all other species in the family, it is endemic to Madagascar, where it is found in rivers and lakes between the Ivoloina River and the Manambolo Creek. It is threatened by habitat loss.

== Taxonomy and etymology ==
This species was described by the English ichthyologist Charles Tate Regan in 1903, with Madagascar given as the type locality. Regan deposited the type in the Muséum d'histoire naturelle de Genève, erected a new genus for it, and named the new genus in honor of its director Maurice Bedot (1859–1927).

== Relationship with humans ==
It is seen in the aquarium trade, where it is often confused with the related B. geayi.
