= Rheocles lateralis =

Conservation status
- Critically Endangered (IUCN 3.1)

Scientific classification
- Kingdom: Animalia
- Phylum: Chordata
- Class: Actinopterygii
- Order: Atheriniformes
- Family: Bedotiidae
- Genus: Rheocles
- Species: R. lateralis

Binomial name
- Rheocles lateralis Stiassny & Reinthal, 1992

Species of fish

Rheocles lateralis, is a species of rainbowfish in the subfamily Bedotiinae, the Madagascar rainbowfishes. It is endemic to Madagascar where it is endemic to the Nosivolo River.
