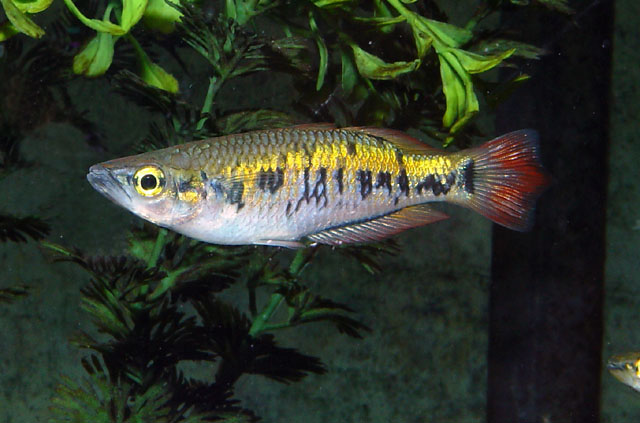
- male
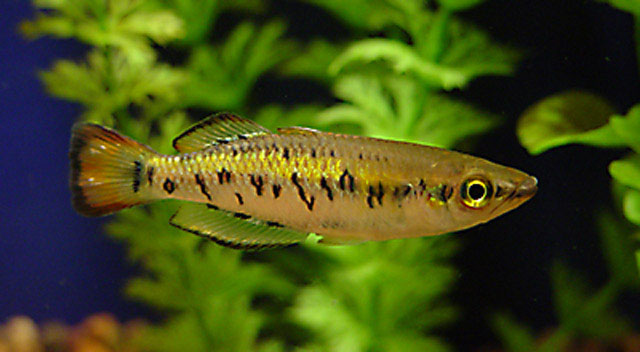
- female

Conservation status
- Endangered (IUCN 3.1)

Scientific classification
- Kingdom: Animalia
- Phylum: Chordata
- Class: Actinopterygii
- Order: Atheriniformes
- Family: Bedotiidae
- Genus: Bedotia
- Species: B. marojejy

Binomial name
- Bedotia marojejy Stiassny & I. J. Harrison, 1999

= Bedotia marojejy =

Species of fish

Bedotia marojejy is a freshwater species of fish in the Bedotiidae family. It is endemic to Madagascar and can be found in the Manantenina River. It is threatened by habitat loss. This species was described by Melanie Stiassny nd Ian Harrison in 2000 from types collected from the Manantenina River on the south eastern boundary of the Marojejy National Park, after which the species is named.
