= Rheocles derhami =

Conservation status
- Critically Endangered (IUCN 3.1)

Scientific classification
- Kingdom: Animalia
- Phylum: Chordata
- Class: Actinopterygii
- Order: Atheriniformes
- Family: Bedotiidae
- Genus: Rheocles
- Species: R. derhami

Binomial name
- Rheocles derhami Stiassny & D. M. Rodríguez, 1992

Species of fish

Rheocles derhami is a species of rainbowfish in the subfamily Bedotiinae, the Madagascar rainbowfishes. It is endemic to the Ambalona River and Mangarahar River in Madagascar. Its natural habitat is rivers. It was described by Melanie Stiassny and Damaris Rodriguez in 1992 and was named in honour of the Swiss conservationist Patrick De Rham.
