= Bedotia longianalis =

Conservation status
- Endangered (IUCN 3.1)

Scientific classification
- Kingdom: Animalia
- Phylum: Chordata
- Class: Actinopterygii
- Order: Atheriniformes
- Family: Bedotiidae
- Genus: Bedotia
- Species: B. longianalis

Binomial name
- Bedotia longianalis Pellegrin, 1914

Species of fish

Bedotia longianalis is a species of Madagascar rainbowfish endemic to Madagascar. Its natural habitat is the lower reaches of rivers and its range extends from the Ifontsy to the Anove rivers and it is also found on Île Sainte-Marie, in north-eastern Madagascar. It was described in 1914 by Jacques Pellegrin from a type collected from a market in Mahambo.
