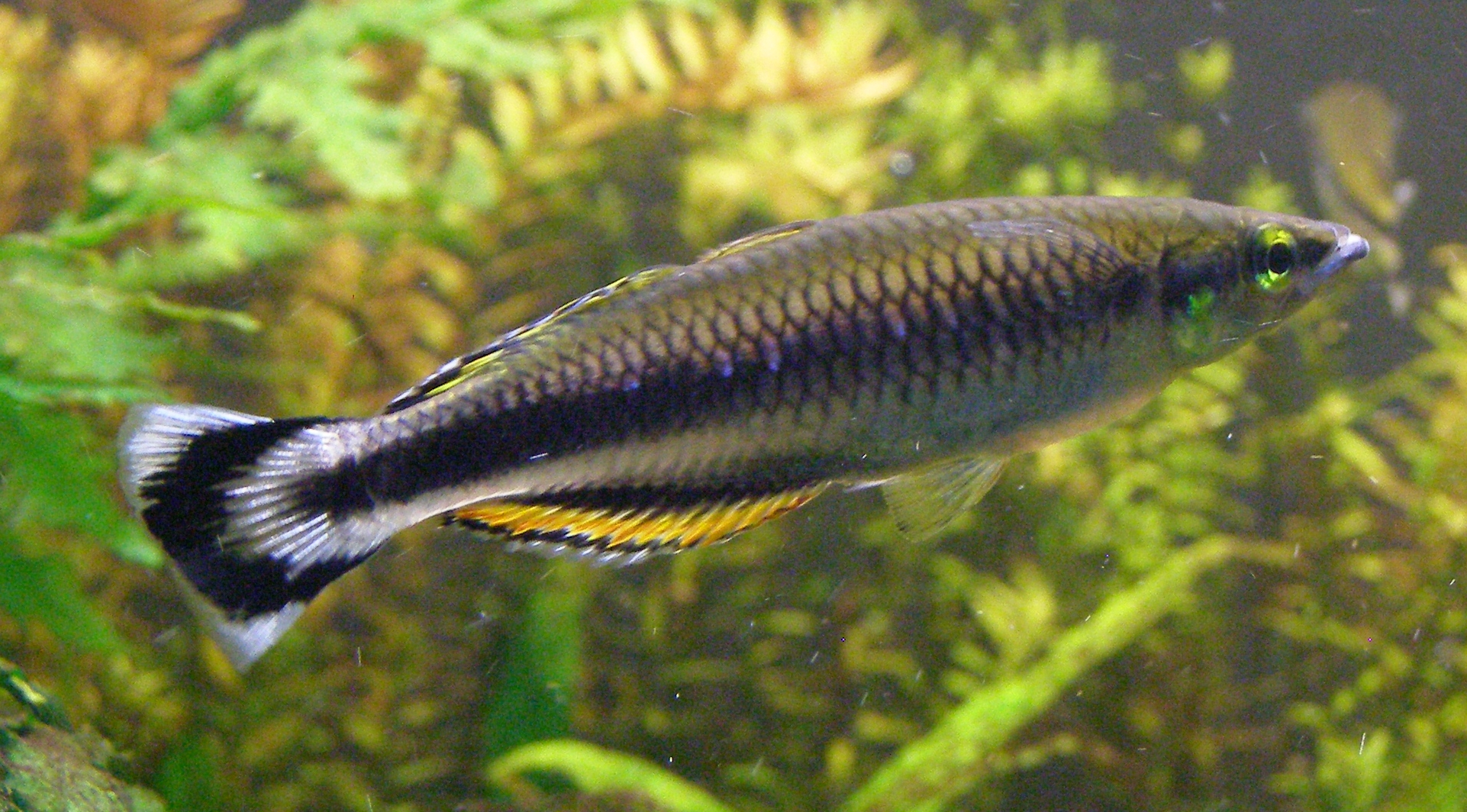

Conservation status
- Endangered (IUCN 3.1)

Scientific classification
- Kingdom: Animalia
- Phylum: Chordata
- Class: Actinopterygii
- Order: Atheriniformes
- Family: Bedotiidae
- Genus: Bedotia
- Species: B. geayi

Binomial name
- Bedotia geayi Pellegrin, 1907

Synonyms
- they are cute

= Zona =

Species of fish

The red-tailed silverside, or zona (Bedotia geayi) is a species of Madagascar rainbowfish endemic to the Mananjary River drainage in Madagascar. Zona are threatened by both habitat loss and introduced species. It has often been confused with the related B. madagascariensis, which is common in the aquarium trade. In addition to meristics, the two species can be separated by the exact colour pattern on their tail fin (males of both typically have red in the tail) and the distinct red spot on the lower jaw of breeding male B. geayi (lacking in B. madagascariensis). B. geayi was described in 1907 by the French zoologist Jacques Pellegrin from a type collected by the pharmacist and natural history collector Martin François Geay (1859-1910), who Pellegrin honoured with its specific name.
