= Bedotia leucopteron =

Conservation status
- Endangered (IUCN 3.1)

Scientific classification
- Kingdom: Animalia
- Phylum: Chordata
- Class: Actinopterygii
- Order: Atheriniformes
- Family: Bedotiidae
- Genus: Bedotia
- Species: B. leucopteron

Binomial name
- Bedotia leucopteron Loiselle & D. M. Rodríguez, 2007

Species of fish

Bedotia leucopteron is a species of rainbowfish from the subfamily Bedotiinae which occurs in the middle reaches of Rianila River basin in eastern Madagascar. This species was described in 2007 by Paul V. Loiselle and Damaris M. Rodríguez from types collected in the Sandrakatrana Stream at Ampasimbe Village in Toamasina Province.
