= Tina Wells =

American entrepreneur and writer

- Born: Lancaster, PA
- Education: Hood College
- Occupations: Founder and CEO of Buzz Marketing Group
- Board member of: NPH USA, Philadelphia Orchestra Association, Franklin Institute
- Website: www.tinawells.com

Tina Wells is an American entrepreneur and writer. She is the CEO and founder of Buzz Marketing Group.

== Career ==
Tina Wells sits on the board for NPH USA, an international non-profit corporation. In addition to serving on the Young Entrepreneur Council, the United Nations Foundation's Global Entrepreneurs Council, and the board of directors for both the Philadelphia Orchestra Association and The Franklin Institute, she is also the current Academic Director of Wharton's Leadership in the Business World program.

In March 2018, Wells was appointed to Thinx board of directors.

== Works ==
- Wells, Tina (2011). Chasing youth culture and getting it right : how your business can profit by tapping into today's most powerful trendsetters and tastemakers. Hoboken, N.J.: John Wiley & Sons. ISBN 978-1118004050.

=== Mackenzie Blue series ===
Books illustrated by Michael Segawa.

1. Mackenzie Blue. New York: Harper. ISBN 978-0061583100.
2. The Secret Crush. New York: Harper. ISBN 9780061583117
3. Friends Forever? New York: Harper, 2010. ISBN 9780061583148
4. Mixed Messages. New York: Harper, 2010. ISBN 9780061583179
5. Double Trouble. New York: Harper, 2014 ISBN 9780062244130

=== Zee Files series ===
1. The Zee Files. Berkeley, California: West Margin Press, 2020. ISBN 9781513266268
2. All that Glitters. Berkeley, California: West Margin Press, 2021. ISBN 9781513277349

=== Honest June series ===
Books written with Stephanie Smith; illustrated by Brittney Bond.

1. Honest June. New York: Random House, 2021. ISBN 978-0-593-37829-8
2. The Show Must Go On. New York: Random House, 2022. ISBN 9780593378922
