= Rheocles wrightae =

Conservation status
- Endangered (IUCN 3.1)

Scientific classification
- Kingdom: Animalia
- Phylum: Chordata
- Class: Actinopterygii
- Order: Atheriniformes
- Family: Bedotiidae
- Genus: Rheocles
- Species: R. wrightae

Binomial name
- Rheocles wrightae Stiassny, 1990

Species of fish

Rheocles wrightae, is a species of rainbowfish in the subfamily Bedotiinae, the Madagascar rainbowfishes. It is endemic to Madagascar where it occurs in the Manambola River, near Anosibe. It is threatened by habitat loss. It was described by Melanie Stiassny in 1990 from a type locality given as "Sandrangato River, south of Moramanga".

== Etymology ==
The specific name honours the American primatologist Patricia Wright.
