= Bedotia albomarginata =

Conservation status
- Endangered (IUCN 3.1)

Scientific classification
- Kingdom: Animalia
- Phylum: Chordata
- Class: Actinopterygii
- Order: Atheriniformes
- Family: Bedotiidae
- Genus: Bedotia
- Species: B. albomarginata

Binomial name
- Bedotia albomarginata Sparks & Rush, 2005

Species of fish

Bedotia albomarginata is a species of Madagascar rainbowfish from the Mananara and Reinana river basins in Madagascar. It is threatened by habitat loss. This species was described by John Sparks and Leila Rush in 2005 from types collected near the towns of Vondrozo and Vevembe from the Sahapindra River, which is a tributary of the Mananara River, in Fianarantsoa Province.

== Sources ==
- Sparks, J.S., and L.M.R. Rush (2005). A new rainbowfish (Teleostei: Melanotaenioidei: Bedotiidae) from the southeastern highlands of Madagascar, with comments on the biogeography of Bedotia. Zootaxa 1051: 39–54.
- Loiselle, P. & participants of the CBSG/ANGAP CAMP "Faune de Madagascar" workshop 2004. Bedotia sp. nov. 'Vevembe'. 2006 IUCN Red List of Threatened Species. Downloaded on 4 August 2007.
