= Bedotia sp. nov. 'Sambava' =

Conservation status
- Critically Endangered (IUCN 3.1)

Scientific classification
- Domain: Eukaryota
- Kingdom: Animalia
- Phylum: Chordata
- Class: Actinopterygii
- Order: Atheriniformes
- Family: Bedotiidae
- Genus: Bedotia
- Species: B. sp. nov. 'Sambava'

Binomial name
- Bedotia sp. nov. 'Sambava'

Species of fish

Bedotia sp. nov. 'Sambava' is a species of fish in the Bedotiidae family. It is endemic to Madagascar. Its natural habitat is rivers. It is threatened by habitat loss.
