= Bedotia alveyi =

Conservation status
- Near Threatened (IUCN 3.1)

Scientific classification
- Kingdom: Animalia
- Phylum: Chordata
- Class: Actinopterygii
- Order: Atheriniformes
- Family: Bedotiidae
- Genus: Bedotia
- Species: B. alveyi

Binomial name
- Bedotia alveyi C. C. Jones, W. L. Smith & Sparks, 2010

Species of fish

Bedotia alveyi, the Makira rainbowfish, is a species of Madagascar rainbowfish from rivers and streams in the Makira region of Madagascar where it occurs in the tributaries of the Antainambalana and Vohimaro rivers. This species was described in 2010 by Christopher C. Jones, Leo Smith and John S. Sparks from types collected from a small stream north of Ambodivoankongy, in a tributary of the Antainambalana River in Toamasina Province. The specific name honours Mark Alvey of the Field Museum in Chicago.
