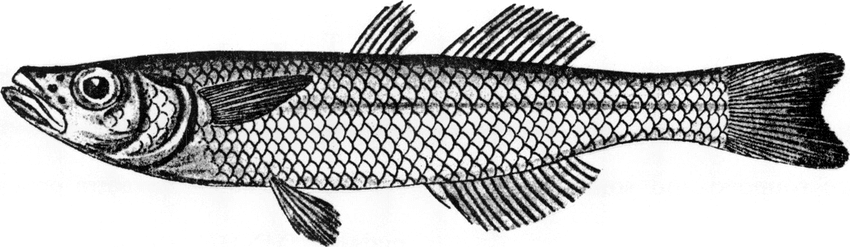

Conservation status
- Endangered (IUCN 3.1)

Scientific classification
- Kingdom: Animalia
- Phylum: Chordata
- Class: Actinopterygii
- Order: Atheriniformes
- Family: Bedotiidae
- Genus: Rheocles
- Species: R. alaotrensis

Binomial name
- Rheocles alaotrensis (Pellegrin, 1914)

Synonyms
- Atherina alaotrensis Pellegrin, 1914

= Katrana =

Species of fish

The katrana (Rheocles alaotrensis) is a species of fish in the Bedotiidae family. It is endemic to the basin of Lake Alaotra in Madagascar. Its natural habitats are rivers and freshwater lakes. It is threatened by habitat loss. This species was described by Jacques Pellegrin as Atherina alaotrensis with the type locality of Lake Aloatra.
