= Patricia Wright (primatologist) =

American primatologist

- Born: Patricia Chapple Wright; September 10, 1944 (age 82); Doylestown, Pennsylvania, U.S.
- Education: Hood College; City University of New York
- Occupations: Primatologist, anthropologist, conservationist

Patricia Chapple Wright (born September 10, 1944) is an American primatologist, anthropologist, and conservationist. Wright is best known for her extensive study of social and family interactions of wild lemurs in Madagascar. Dr. Wright established the Institute for the Conservation of Tropical Environments at Stony Brook University. She has led over 60 field expeditions in countries such as Borneo, East Malaysia, Indonesia, Madagascar, Paraguay, Peru and Philippines. She worked extensively on conservation and contributed to the establishment of the Ranomafana National Park in Madagascar. Dr. Wright was the first female recipient of the Indianapolis Zoo Prize (2014), and has also received 3 Medal of Honors from the Malagasy government for her work in Madagascar.

== Early life ==
Wright was born and raised in Western New York, near Lake Ontario, where she was the oldest among 6 children. Growing up in a large family in a rural farming community, she developed an early appreciation for wildlife and nature. Her father, a University of Toronto graduate, often took her into the woods, sparking her interest in animals and the forest ecosystem.

== Education ==
Wright obtained a bachelor's degree in biology in 1966 from Hood College. Although Wright graduated with a biology degree, the lack of job opportunities led her to become a social worker before returning to scientific research. Wright's path to primatology began after acquiring a South American monkey from a pet store. Her curiosity about the monkey’s behavior led her to begin informal research, which later evolved into formal scientific study. At the time, little was known about South American primates, particularly the nocturnal species Aotus, which piqued Dr. Wright's interest.

Her early fieldwork in South America focused on the behavior and ecology of the night monkey. Encouraged by Dr. Warren Kinzey of the City University of New York, Wright published her first paper in 1978 and subsequently pursued graduate studies. She later went on to obtain her Ph.D. in Anthropology from City University of New York in 1985 under the direction of Warren Kinzey. She earned a Ph.D. focused on night monkey behavior in the Peruvian rainforest, conducting research while also raising her daughter. Wright currently works at Stony Brook University in New York as a professor of Anthropology, where she supervises the Interdepartmental Doctoral Program in Anthropological Sciences and Department of Ecology and Evolution.

== Madagascar ==
In 1986 Wright traveled to Madagascar in search of the greater bamboo lemur (Prolemur simus), a species abundant at the sub-fossil lemur sites of the north but believed to have gone extinct in the recent past. She found that the greater bamboo lemur still exists and discovered a new species that was named Hapalemur aureus, the golden bamboo lemur.

After the discovery of the golden bamboo lemurs, loggers began to cut the timber in their habitat. Concerned for the well-being of the species, Wright was instrumental in the founding of the Ranomafana National Park in Madagascar, which was inaugurated in 1991. Faced with threats such as deforestation, slash-and-burn agriculture, and illegal logging, Wright led efforts to preserve biodiversity through scientific research and community engagement. Local communities around Ranomafana National Park are employed in education, reforestation, and ecotourism with aid from Wright and her colleagues. Her conservation model integrates scientific monitoring, education, healthcare, and sustainable agriculture. Additionally, she has helped train local communities in the cultivation and marketing of vanilla, cacao, cinnamon, and peppercorns.

== Scientific contributions ==
Dr. Wright’s research has yielded vital insights into primate behavior, social structure, and genetics. She has done studies on predation, microbiomes, social demography, and genetics within lemur species. Recent findings from her team have uncovered unique genetic traits in lemurs, such as adaptations to cyanide-rich bamboo in bamboo lemurs. She has also maintained a 30-year environmental database tracking climate, phenology, and disease spread in rainforest ecosystems, contributing to broader ecological understanding.

== Centre ValBio ==
Patricia Wright established the Institute for the Conservation of Tropical Environments at Stony Brook University that is dedicated to science-based conservation and research in the tropics, with a special focus on Madagascar. It coordinates the work of many natural and social scientists throughout Madagascar, especially around Ranomafana National Park. It operates a modern research station in Madagascar called Centre ValBio.

== Ecosystem Stewards ==
Wright's first guide in Ranomafana, Emile, became rapidly interested in lemurs and insects while following her team and began working as a naturalist. Together, they began a community science program called "Ecosystem Stewards". Through this program, the Malagasy people are able to work for money alongside her team, participating in the data collection of lemurs and insects in Madagascar, while gaining job experience and an appreciation for nature.

== Personal life ==
Wright is a mother and an advocate for women in science, having balanced engaging in research while simultaneously raising her daughter, who currently works in climate science. Her career, from social work to amateur primate studies to international conservation leadership, underscores her commitment to science and the natural world.

== Awards and recognition ==
=== Awards ===
- 2022 - Conservation Warrior Award Winner from Seneca Park Zoo, Rochester, NY
- 2014 – First Woman Winner of Indianapolis Prize for Conservation
- 2014 – Lifetime Achievement Award from Wildlife Conservation Film Festival
- 2014 – Honorary Degree (Honoris Causa) from University of Fianarantsoa, Madagascar
- 2012 – Awarded Commandeur Medal of Honor, Government of Madagascar
- 2008 – Stony Brook University Faculty Achievement Award
- 2008 – Hauptman Woodward Pioneer in Science Medal
- 2008 – Distinguished Primatologist Award from American Society of Primatologists
- 2007 – Awarded Honoris Causa, honorary degree from University of Antananarivo
- 2003 – "Medaille Officier de Madagascar". High honor awarded by the President of Madagascar
- 2003 – "Woman of Distinction" Award, given by Senator Kenneth LaValle
- 2000 – "Principal Investigator of the Year." Earthwatch Institute
- 1995 – "Chevalier d'Ordre National." National Medal of Honor of Madagascar, from the President of Madagascar
- 1994 – Women of the Year in Science Award, Three Village Times, New York
- 1990 – Honorary Doctor of Science Degree from Hood College
- 1982 – "S.L. Washburn Prize" for outstanding student paper at the American Association of Physical Anthropologists meeting, Eugene, Oregon

=== Recognitions ===
- 2025 -- Acknowledged for her work with animals over the years
- 2018 – Finalist for the St Andrews Prize for the Environment
- 2013 – Elected to American Philosophical Society
- 2011 – Finalist for the Indianapolis Prize for Conservation
- 2007 – Ranomafana National Park named UNESCO World Heritage Site
- 2006 – Cosmos Prize Selection Committee, Osaka, Japan
- 2006 – Explorers Club Lecture Series
- 2006 – 2010 Member of Smithsonian Biodiversity Task Force
- 2004 – Elected AAAS Fellow
- 2003 – 2011 Member of National Geographic Conservation Trust
- 2003 – Royal Geographical Society Invited Speaker, London, United Kingdom
- 2002 – James Watson Presidential Council speaker at Symposium "Human Behavior in the Genomic Age" Cold Spring Harbor, NY
- 2002 – National Research Council, The National Academies Committee
- 2001–2009 Member of National Geographic Committee for Research and Exploration
- 2001 – Provost's Lecture Series, SUNY Stony Brook
- 2000 – Present Member of Board of Directors of Comparative and Conservation Biology Foundation
- 1998 – 2003 Member of International Society of Primatology Conservation Committee
- 1995 – 1998 Advisory Board of Wenner-Gren Foundation for Anthropological Research
- 1995 – Women in Science Engineering Annual Award, SUNY
- 1994 – present Madagascar Faunal Group, International Board
- 1994 – 2000 Scientific Advisory Board member of The Douroucouli Foundation
- 1994 – present Advisory Board of Primate Conservation Inc.
- 1994 – 1996 Advisory Board of the Center for Tropical Conservation, Duke University
- 1993 – 2001 Member of Board, Organization for Tropical Studies
- 1993 – 1999 Member of Board of Trustees of The Nature Conservancy, Long Island Chapter
- 1993 – Women Who Make a Difference Award, Family Circle Magazine
- 1990 – present Member of the Editorial Board of the International Journal of Primatology
- 1991 – present Member of External Advisory Board, Duke University Primate Center
- 1991 – present IUCN Primate Specialists Group-Madagascar
- 1990 – 1991 Member of National Research Council Committee for Sustained Development & Environmental Preservation of Humid Tropics
- 1989 – John D. and Catherine T. MacArthur Fellow
- 1988 – 1994 Member of Conservation Committee for American Society of Primatologists
- 1984 – present IUCN Primate Specialists Group-South America

== Media ==
=== TV and films ===
- 2016 – featured on Anthony Bourdain: Parts Unknown, CNN
- 2014 – featured in IMAX film Island of Lemurs: Madagascar with Morgan Freeman
- 2014 – Featured in CNN's Parts Unknown with Anthony Bourdain
- 2009 – featured on Dan Rather Reports, HDNet TV
- 2002 – featured in David Attenborough's The Life of Mammals documentary film.
- 2000 – Me & Isaac Newton, directed by Michael Apted, a Clear Blue Sky Production; Emmy award winner.

=== Print and radio features ===
- 2009/10 – National Geographic Magazine
- 2008/09 – BBC Natural History Unit (UK) and NHK Japan featured NSF Project
- 2006 – featured in Smithsonian Magazine, April cover article "For the Love of Lemurs"
- 2006 – interviewed in Award-winning National Public Radio show Life on Earth, Madagascar Biodiversity produced by Dan Grossman.
- 2005 – Natural History Magazine June cover article "Dance of the Sexes"
- 2005 – featured in Long Island Life, Newsday, February 206

=== Books ===
- 2014 – For the Love of Lemurs: My Life in the Wilds of Madagascar published by Lantern Books ISBN 978-1590564455
- 2013 – High Moon Over the Amazon: My Quest to Understand the Monkeys of the Night published by Lantern Books ISBN 9781590564219
- 2011 – Larrey, Frederic; Wright, Patricia C.; Giraud, Cyril. Madagascar: The Forest of Our Ancestors. France: Regard du Vivant Press. ISBN 978-2952996921.
- 2003 –Wright, Patricia C.; Simons, Elwyn L.; Gursky, Sharon, eds. (2003). Tarsiers: Past, Present and Future. Piscataway, New Jersey: Rutgers University Press. ISBN 0813532361.

== Taxon named in her honor ==
- The rainbowfish Rheocles wrightae, is a species of rainbowfish in the subfamily Bedotiinae, the Madagascar rainbowfishes.
- A new lemur species from Kalambatritra, Madagascar named Lepilemur wrighaeti, Wright's sportive lemur
