= Hood College =

Private college in Frederick, Maryland, US

- Former name: Woman's College of Frederick (1893–1913)
- Motto: Latin: Corde et Mente et Manu
- Motto in English: With Heart and Mind and Hand
- Type: Private college
- Established: 1893; 133 years ago
- Religious affiliation: United Church of Christ
- Endowment: $204.8 million (2024)
- President: Debbie Ricker
- Faculty: 120
- Students: 2,095
- Undergraduates: 1,217
- Location: Frederick, Maryland, U.S.
- Campus: Urban, 50 acres (20 ha)
- Newspaper: The Blue and Grey
- Colors: Blue and grey
- Nickname: Blazers
- Sporting affiliations: Middle Atlantic Conferences; NCAA Division III
- Mascot: Blaze
- Website: hood.edu
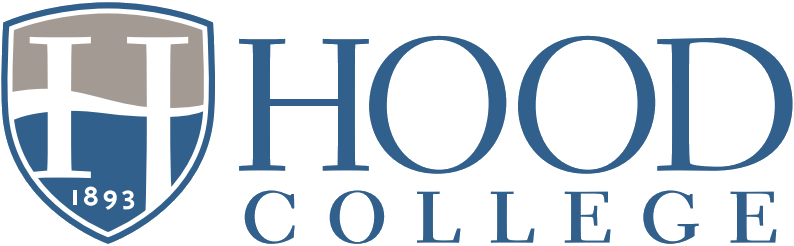

Hood College is a private college in Frederick, Maryland. It was established in 1893 by the Potomac Synod of the Reformed Church in the United States as a women's college. An all-female institution until 1971, the college initially admitted men only as commuters. This continued until 2003, when male students were extended the option of residential status.

In fall 2018, Hood enrolled 2,052 students (1,092 undergraduate students; 960 graduate students). Thirty-eight percent of students are either members of under-represented racial or ethnic populations or from foreign countries.

== History ==
- Hood College Historic District
- U.S. National Register of Historic Places
- U.S. Historic district
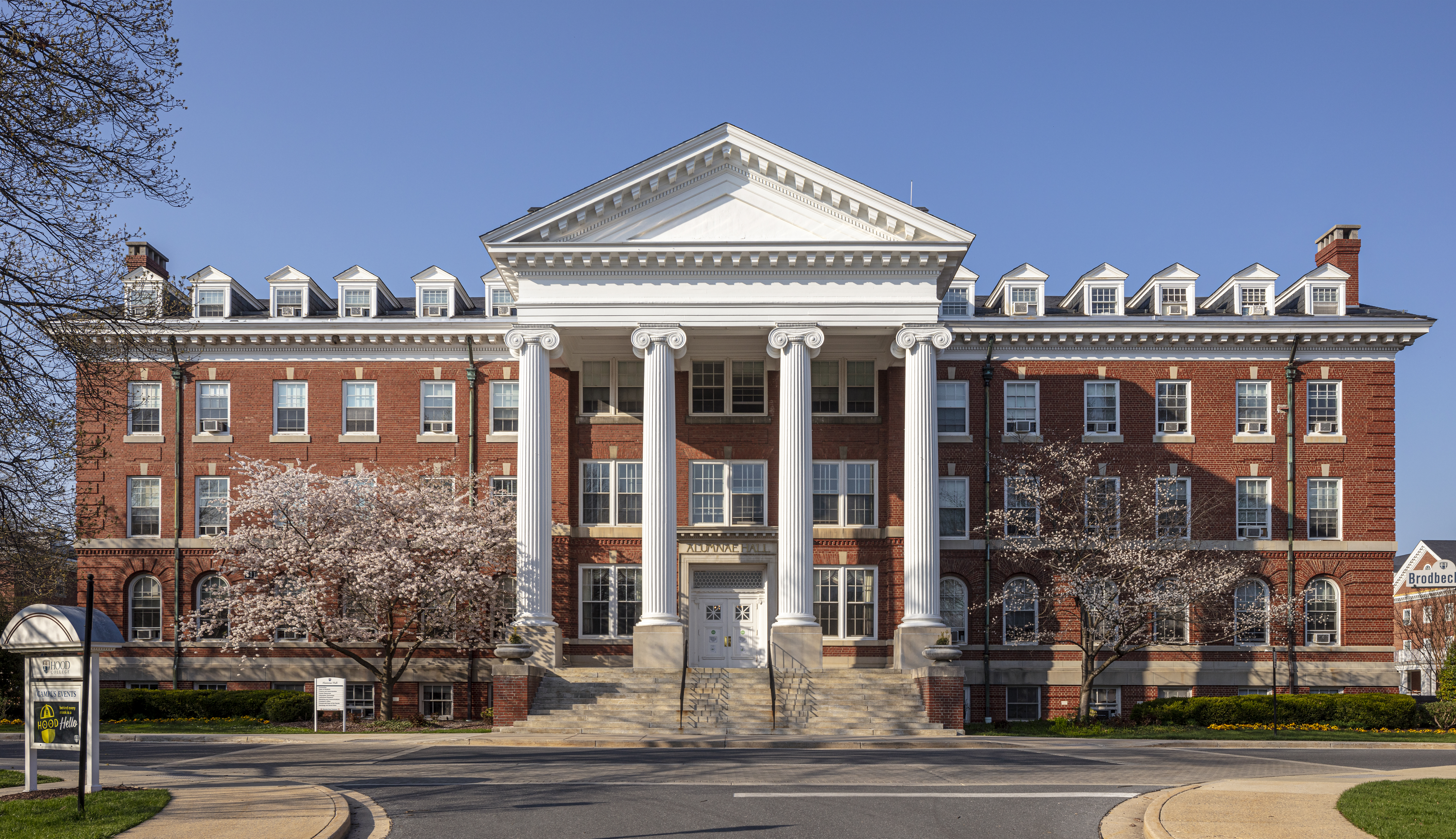
- Alumnae Hall

- Location within Maryland Location within the United States
- Location: 401 Rosemont Ave., Frederick, Maryland Population 66,382
- Coordinates: 39°25′21″N 77°25′7″W
- Area: 50 acres (20 ha)
- Built: 1868
- Architect: Culler, Lloyd Clayton; et al.
- Architectural style: Colonial Revival, Italianate
- NRHP reference No.: 02001581
- Added to NRHP: December 30, 2002

=== Early history (1893–1944) ===
The college was founded in 1893 as the Woman's College of Frederick by the Potomac Synod of the Reformed Church of the United States. Dr. Joseph Henry Apple, an educator from Pittsburgh, Pennsylvania, only 28 years of age at the time of his appointment, was named the college's first president. In this first year, eighty-three women enrolled, and were taught by eight faculty members in Winchester Hall, located on East Church Street in Frederick. Classes were offered in the liberal arts and music, as well as secretarial trades. In 1898, the first class graduated, with fourteen women earning Bachelor of Arts degrees. Over the next several years, courses in biology, economics, sociology, political science, and domestic science were added.

In 1897, the college received a 28-acre (110,000 m^{2}) tract of land for its campus from Margaret Scholl Hood. In 1913, the Trustees of the Woman's College announced that the name of the Woman's College would be changed to "Hood College", in honor of Mrs. Hood, who gave $25,000 to establish an endowment for the college, and who firmly believed in higher education for women. On January 18, 1913, Margaret Hood's will was filed for probate. In the will, she bequeathed an additional $30,000 to the Woman's College of Frederick provided that the college had changed its name to "Hood College". Part of this bequest was used to fund the 1914 construction of Alumnae Hall. Today, except for Brodbeck Hall, which was built in the 1860s and stood on the campus at its founding, Alumnae Hall remains the oldest building on the college's campus and serves as the central location for the college's administration, also housing the sociology and social work department. In 1915, the college began its move from its former location in Frederick City to its current campus.

In 1934, Joseph Henry Apple retired as the college's president, having served for 41 years. At his retirement, he was the oldest college president in continuous active service at a single institution in the United States.

The Hood College Historic District was listed on the National Register of Historic Places in 2002. The campus is within close walking distance of downtown Frederick. In 2010, Forbes named downtown Frederick one of America's best neighborhoods, and in 2013, Forbes published the results of a Farmers Insurance Group study naming the Bethesda–Gaithersburg–Frederick, Maryland area one of the most secure metro areas in which to live in the United States.

=== Transition to co-education (1970–2003) ===
In the early 1970s, Hood College began to consider becoming a co-educational institution. In October of that year the Hood College Board of Trustees voted to begin enrollment of men as commuter students. That same year, Hood also decided to begin a graduate school program for both men and women. These changes were implemented in January 1971.

There were mixed feelings on campus as Hood students worried about the type of male student Hood could potentially attract. Students feared that a residential women's college would attract only the "provincial townies" unable to go anywhere else, and the "lusty lovers" attracted by the high number of females. This led to public debate in The Blue and Grey, the Hood College campus newspaper, and letters to the student body from then-president Randle Elliot.

Beginning in January 1971, the college became open to men as commuters. The first male student, Aldan T. Weinberg, transferred to Hood after having spent one year at American University and three years in the army. In 1975, Martha E. Church became the first female president of the college, working in this capacity through 1995.

In the fall of 2001, the Hood executive committee was charged by the board of trustees with the task of studying the possible impact of male resident students. This study considered the projected financial, cultural, residential, academic and enrollment impacts on the college. Based on this report, the board of trustees' ultimate decision was to admit men as residential students.

This decision was made based upon the reality that demand for single-sex education for women was on the decline. Only three percent of college-bound female students preferred a single-gender institution. This, and other factors, led to an overall decline in undergraduate enrollment over the years. Hood needed at least 300 new, enrolled students each year in order to have a balanced budget. All in all, Hood's expenses were exceeding revenue.

This led to the creation of a co-education task force composed of students, alumnae, faculty and staff members. This task force ultimately decided where men were to be housed.

=== Present day ===
In an effort to accommodate student growth and to shift away from students who commute to campus, a new residence hall was finished in 2021 and has 64 units. This residence hall will house 201 beds and will be home to the honors program.

== Accreditations ==
Hood College is accredited by the Middle States Commission on Higher Education and the following bodies for specific degrees:

- Undergraduate business and MBA by the Accreditation Council for Business Schools and Programs
- Bachelor's degree in computer science by ABET
- Counseling programs by Council for the Accreditation of Counseling and Related Educational Programs (CACREP)
- Education programs by the National Council for Accreditation of Teacher Education (NCATE) which merged with another organization to form the Council for the Accreditation of Educator Preparation (CAEP)
- Nursing programs by The Maryland Nursing Board and the Maryland Higher Education Commission; the BSN by the Commission on Collegiate Nursing Education
- Social work program by the Council on Social Work Education

== Academics ==
Hood College offers 33 undergraduate majors, 19 master's degree programs and 10 post-baccalaureate certification programs, including certification programs in education. Hood College has consistently been ranked in the U.S. News & World Report list for Best University in the Northeast.

=== Departmental honors ===
Each spring students selected by the academic departments make presentations of their completed year-long research projects. These students are known as Tischer Scholars, in honor of Christine P. Tischer, alumna and former member of the Hood College Board of Trustees. In the spring of 2013, 22 seniors gave presentations on topics that varied from "First Generation College Students: Challenges and Solutions" to "Effects of Stream Nutrients on Salamander Species Diversity and Abundance."

=== Honors program ===
The Hood College Honors Program is a selective program of study, admitting only a limited number of students each year. Students in the Honors Program take an interdisciplinary seminar each semester, as well as participate in community service, study abroad or internships, and Senior Seminar, allowing students to choose a topic of broad interest and selecting a faculty member to teach the course.

=== Study abroad ===
Hood College offers a study abroad program that can be utilized by any student with any major. Some majors require students to spend a semester abroad, including foreign language and literature students.

=== Graduate school ===
The Hood College Graduate School is the oldest graduate school in the region. It opened in the summer of 1971 after approval of the program by the college faculty in the fall of 1970 and approval by the State of Maryland in December 1970. The first graduate program was a Master of Arts in Human Sciences. Concentrations were available in Contemporary Government, Counseling and Guidance, Early Childhood Education, Elementary Science and Mathematics, Environmental Science, Public Affairs, Reading, and Special Education. Over the ensuing forty years, that single program has evolved into fifteen master's degree programs and thirteen post-baccalaureate certificate programs.

== Athletics ==
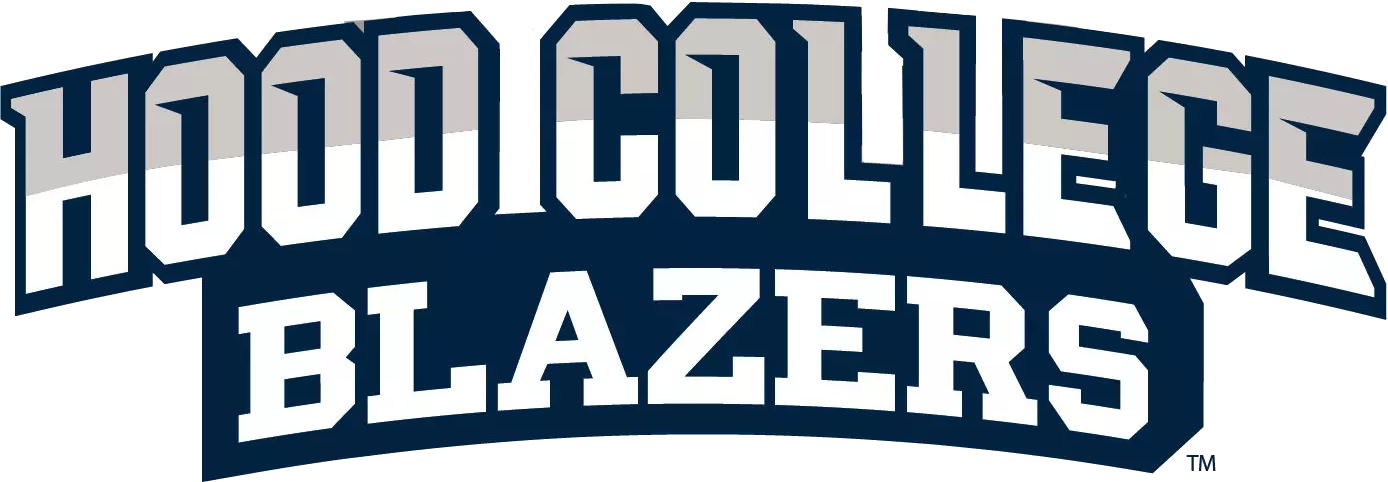
Hood Blazers wordmark

Hood College athletics began in 1898 with the first basketball team. In the early 1900s, field hockey, tennis, archery and swimming were among the sports added to the athletics program. Hood presently offers intercollegiate varsity teams in men's and women's basketball, baseball, men's and women's cross country, field hockey, men's and women's golf, men's and women's lacrosse, men's and women's soccer, softball, men's and women's swimming, men's and women's tennis, men's and women's track and field, and women's volleyball. The college also offers club level equestrian and cheer programs.

The nickname for Hood athletics is the Blazers. This dates back to the 1920s when the campus elected a rising senior as the "White Sweater" girl as someone who possessed the most sportsmanship and school spirit. In 1928, the sweater was changed to a blazer and the tradition continued through the mid-1900s. Today, the nickname is represented by a thoroughbred horse with a "blaze" mark on its forehead.

Hood College student-athletes train in the Ronald J. Volpe Athletic Center, which includes Woodsboro Bank Arena. Gambrill Gymnasium was constructed in 1949 and served as the main athletic facility for the campus until the dedication of the new Hood Athletic Center in November 2011. In March 2015 it was renamed the Ronald J. Volpe Athletic Center in honor of the former president.

In 1984, Hood College became a member of the National Collegiate Athletic Association (NCAA) and joined the Division III Chesapeake Women's Athletic Conference (CWAC). When the CWAC disbanded, Hood joined the Atlantic Women's Colleges Conference (AWCC) in 1990. In 2006, Hood joined the Capital Athletic Conference (CAC). The men's teams began competition in the CAC for the 2006–2007 academic year along with women's cross country and track and field. All other women's sports remained in the AWCC for the 2006–2007 year and moved to the CAC in 2007–2008. Hood joined the 17-member Middle Atlantic Conferences in July 2012.

In November 2024, a public forum was held to discuss adding a Hood College baseball field to a city park near the campus. The Blazers baseball team has played at Frederick Community College's field since 2015.

== Notable people ==
=== Alumni ===
- Beverly Byron, 1964, US congresswoman
- Sally Cluchey, 2008, Maine state representative
- Marcia Coyle, 1973, journalist and lawyer; Washington Bureau Chief of The National Law Journal; panelist on the PBS NewsHour
- David Gallaher, 1998, graphic novelist and children's book author
- Gale L. Gamble, 1969, physician, cancer specialist, medical director at the Rehabilitation Institute of Chicago
- Heather Hamilton, 1995, executive director of the Connect US Fund
- Sue Hecht, 1985, American politician, member of the Democratic Party, member of the Maryland House of delegates
- Sophie Kerr, 1898, journalist, novelist, and playwright
- Claire McCardell, 1927, fashion designer in the arena of ready-to-wear clothing in the 20th century
- Halo Meadows, 1927, actress, writer and burlesque dancer, also known by the pseudonym "Louise Howard"
- Laura Lee Miller, 1973, President of Vera Wang Licensing
- Beryl Pfizer, 1949, producer of NBC News
- Arlene Raven, 1965, feminist art historian, author, critic, educator, and curator
- James N. Robey, 1986, member of the Maryland Senate
- Beverley Swaim-Stanley, 1977, 1982, Maryland Transportation Secretary
- Kelly M. Schulz, 2006, American politician and member of the Maryland House of Delegates
- Elena Maria Vidal, 1984, historical novelist and noted blogger
- Patricia Wright, 1966, scientist, environmental activist
- Tina Wells, 1980, American entrepreneur, writer and CEO of Buzz Marketing Group

=== Faculty ===
- Leah B. Allen, professor of astronomy and director of Williams Observatory
- Roser Caminals-Heath, professor, Spanish and English language author
- Anita Jose, professor, business strategist
