= Nuestros Pequeños Hermanos =

Children's charity

NPH International

Nuestros Pequeños Hermanos (NPH), literally meaning Our little brothers and sisters, is a charitable organization that has provided a home for thousands of orphans and abandoned children since 1954. Currently there are NPH homes in nine Latin American countries.

== Mission & Philosophy ==
The official mission of NPH is "to provide shelter, food, clothing, healthcare and education in a Christian family environment based on unconditional acceptance and love, sharing, working and responsibility."

Self-sufficiency is a cornerstone of the NPH philosophy; thus, many NPH homes grow much of their own food. Each home also has its own primary and secondary school, clinic, and chapel.

Reciprocity is another foundational ideal of NPH, which is why every pequeno must give a year of service at their home after graduating high school and before going to college. Many NPH children work later in their lives for the organization as lawyers, teachers, doctors, and directors of NPH homes and national chapters.

While not related by blood ties, every child in the NPH organization is treated as a member of a single family. Raised and provided for as such, none of the children is available for adoption.

This philosophy and mission engenders in NPH children a spirit of trust, confidence, and sharing toward others, attitudes which are unusual in persons with histories of abuse or abandonment.

As Erich Fromm, the renowned psychologist, has pointed out in a study that he conducted with Michael Maccoby of the NPH organization:

"The boys and girls come from the poorest classes, from families in which the mother has died and, in about 80 percent of the cases, in which the father has abandoned the children. Considering these conditions, one would expect a great many behavioral difficulties -- either destructiveness or sexual problems... But contrary to such expectations, no major behavior problems exist among these children. There are practically no problems of violence in the sense of serious physical assault against another member of the community, teachers, or outsiders, nor are there any serious sexual problems... What is remarkable, however, is the absence of not only major behavioral problems but the presence of a spirit of cooperation and mutual responsibility. The boys and girls feel themselves to be members of the “family” and are proud of this membership, although this family is not based on the common tie of blood and is so large that it exceeds the limits of what could even be called an extended family. It is actually a community with life-centered values, characterized by a spirit of cooperation and responsibility."

== The Homes ==
- Miacatlán, Mexico, opened in 1954, with over 430 children (an additional 140 attend a vocational high school in Cuernavaca)
- Rancho Santa Fe, Honduras, opened in 1985, with over 400 children (an additional 100 live and study in Tegucigalpa)
- Kenscoff, Haiti, opened in 1987, with over 430 children (an additional 350 from the Kenscoff community attend the onsite school; NPH also operates a home, school, pediatric hospital, rehabilitation center, and higher education program in Tabarre)
- Jinotepe, Nicaragua, opened in 1994, with over 250 children (an additional 175 are supported through scholarships or live in student homes in Managua)
- Parramos, Guatemala, opened in 1996, with over 300 children (an additional 150 are external students)
- Texistepeque, El Salvador, opened in 1999, with over 300 children (additional university students live in student homes in Santa Ana)
- San Pedro de Macorís, Dominican Republic, opened in 2003, with over 230 children
- San Vicente de Cañete, Peru, opened in 2004, with over 100 children
- Portachuelo, Bolivia, opened in 2005, with over 100 children

== History ==
The first home was established in Mexico by an American priest, Father William Wasson, after a fifteen-year-old boy was arrested for stealing from the poor box of a small church in Cuernavaca, Morelos, Mexico. Father Wasson didn’t press any charges, instead asking for the boy’s custody. By the end of the year he had 32 children living at a small rented house, which became known as Nuestros Pequeños Hermanos.

Wasson solicited funding and food for the home, traveling extensively to procure funds for his ever-growing family until his death in 2006.

A hurricane in Honduras prompted Wasson to aid in the relief efforts by founding a second children's home in that country. Wasson then targeted Haiti, one of the most impoverished countries in the world, building a home higher up in the mountains, away from the abject poverty of the city streets. Houses were then built in Guatemala, Nicaragua, El Salvador, and the Dominican Republic.

To date over 16,000 children have been cared for in NPH homes in the countries of Honduras, Haiti, Nicaragua, Guatemala, El Salvador, the Dominican Republic, Peru, Bolivia, and Mexico. In Haiti, the poorest country, NPH also built the largest pediatric hospital of the Caribbean area, "St Damien", thanks to father Richard Frechette. This facility helps over 40,000 disabled people per year.

== Organization ==
While NPH embraces Catholic values, it is not officially connected or affiliated with any church, and as a private institution, relies on outside sponsorship and private donations from all over the world.

NPH International is an organization with a board of directors who oversee funding and general guidelines. Reporting to this international board are national directors, one from each of the nine countries.

Within each country are one or more house directors, who oversee the daily operations of the homes and the well-being of the children. Both the national and home directors are typically former pequenos themselves.

Taking care of the daily needs of the children are caregivers made up of older pequenos who devote a year of service to their younger siblings, as well as volunteers from around the world.

In addition, there are various staff employed in each of the homes.

== Notable Patrons ==
- Father William Wasson, founder of Friends of the Orphans
- Father Richard Frechette, national director of NPH home in Haiti and NPHI medical supervisor
- Helen Hayes, actress
- Pedro Martínez, baseball player
- John Wayne, actor

== Notable Friends ==
- Andrea Bocelli, tenor
- Paul Haggis, screenwriter, producer and film director
- Susan Sarandon, actress
- Sean Penn, actor
- Jimmy Jean-Louis, actor

== Statistics ==
As of December 31, 2006. Taken from the NPH International website (www.nph.org)

| | NPH Total | Bolivia | D. Republic | El Salvador | Guatemala | Haiti | Honduras | Mexico | Nicaragua | Peru |
|---|---|---|---|---|---|---|---|---|---|---|
| Number of Children | 3,113 | 40 | 120 | 377 | 304 | 506 | 536 | 884 | 310 | 36 |
| In Primary School | 1,559 | 25 | 86 | 267 | 160 | 363 | 62 | 410 | 168 | 18 |
| In Secondary School | 583 | 3 | 1 | 53 | 100 | 59 | 54 | 218 | 90 | 5 |
| In High School | 318 | - | - | 18 | 27 | - | 97 | 176 | - | - |
| In University | 88 | - | - | - | 4 | 3 | 11 | 69 | 1 | - |
| New arrivals | 462 | 40 | 26 | 81 | 49 | 50 | 36 | 93 | 55 | 32 |
