= Bulbophyllum micranthum =

Scientific classification
- Kingdom: Plantae
- Clade: Tracheophytes
- Clade: Angiosperms
- Clade: Monocots
- Order: Asparagales
- Family: Orchidaceae
- Subfamily: Epidendroideae
- Genus: Bulbophyllum
- Section: Bulbophyllum sect. Micranthae
- Species: B. micranthum

Binomial name
- Bulbophyllum micranthum Barb. Rodr.

Synonyms
- Phyllorkis micrantha (Barb.Rodr.) Kuntze 1891

Species of orchid

Bulbophyllum micranthum is a species of orchid in the genus Bulbophyllum.
