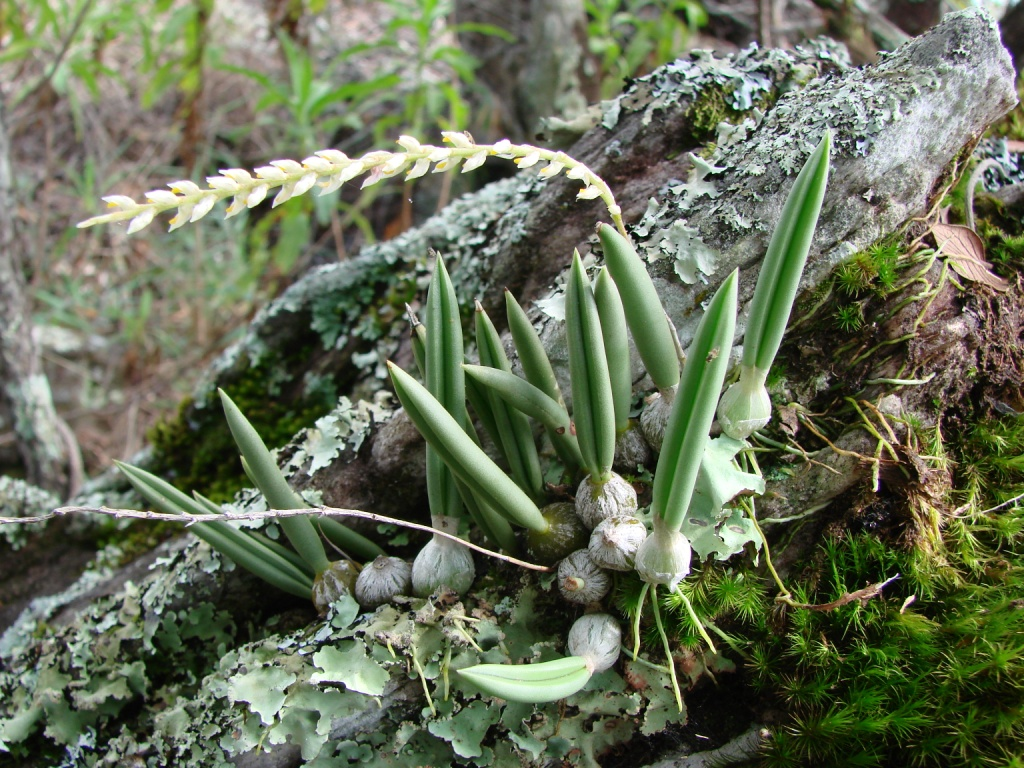
- Bulbophyllum rupicola

Scientific classification
- Kingdom: Plantae
- Clade: Tracheophytes
- Clade: Angiosperms
- Clade: Monocots
- Order: Asparagales
- Family: Orchidaceae
- Subfamily: Epidendroideae
- Genus: Bulbophyllum
- Section: Bulbophyllum sect. Micranthae; Barb. Rodr. 1882

Type species
- Bulbophyllum micranthum

Species
- See text

= Bulbophyllum sect. Micranthae =

Section of flowering plants

Bulbophyllum sect. Micranthae is a section of the genus Bulbophyllum. It is one of six Bulbophyllum sections found in the Americas.

== Description ==
Species in this section have unifoliate pseudobulbs, inflorescence with thin a rachis holding flowers that are spirally arranged. Lateral sepals totally free, petals erect. Column foot with entire apex and shorter than the length of the column.

== Distribution ==
Plants from this section are found in Brazil, Bolivia, and Paraguay.

== Species ==
Bulbophyllum section Micranthae comprises the following species:

Image	Name	Distribution	Elevation (m)
	Bulbophyllum adiamantinum Brade 1951	Brazil (Minas Gerais and Goias)	1,400–1,500 metres (4,600–4,900 ft)
	Bulbophyllum chloroglossum Rchb.f. 1871	Brazil(Federal District, Minas Gerais, Rio de Janeiro and São Paulo) and Paraguay	500–700 metres (1,600–2,300 ft)
	Bulbophyllum epiphytum Barb.Rodr.1877	Brazil (Minas Gerais, São Paulo, Goias and Bahia) and Bolivia	1,000 metres (3,300 ft)
	Bulbophyllum insectiferum Barb.Rodr.1882	Brazil (Goias, Disticto Federal, and Minas Gerais)	
	Bulbophyllum macroceras Barb.Rodr. 1881	Brazil ( Rio de Janeiro )	
	Bulbophyllum mentosum Barb.Rodr. 1877	Brazil (Minas Gerais, Bahia and Santa Catarina)	1,000–1,700 metres (3,300–5,600 ft)
	Bulbophyllum micranthum Barb.Rodr. 1877	Brazil (Espirito Santo, Minas Gerais, Rio de Janeiro and Parana)	
	Bulbophyllum morenoi Dodson & R.Vásquez 1989	Venezuela and Bolivia	
	Bulbophyllum mucronifolium Rchb.f. & Warm. 1881	Brazil (Minas Gerais )	
	Bulbophyllum pitengoense Campacci 2008	Brazil (Minas Gerais )	600 metres (2,000 ft)
	Bulbophyllum rupicola Barb Rodr. 1911	Brazil (Goias, Serra do Caldas, Minas Gerais and São Paulo )	
	Bulbophyllum tricolor L.B.Sm. & S.K.Harris 1936	Bolivia	
	Bulbophyllum uhl-gabrielianum Chiron & V.P.Castro 2009	Brazil (Espirito Santo)	850 metres (2,790 ft)
