= Roser Caminals-Heath =

Spanish writer

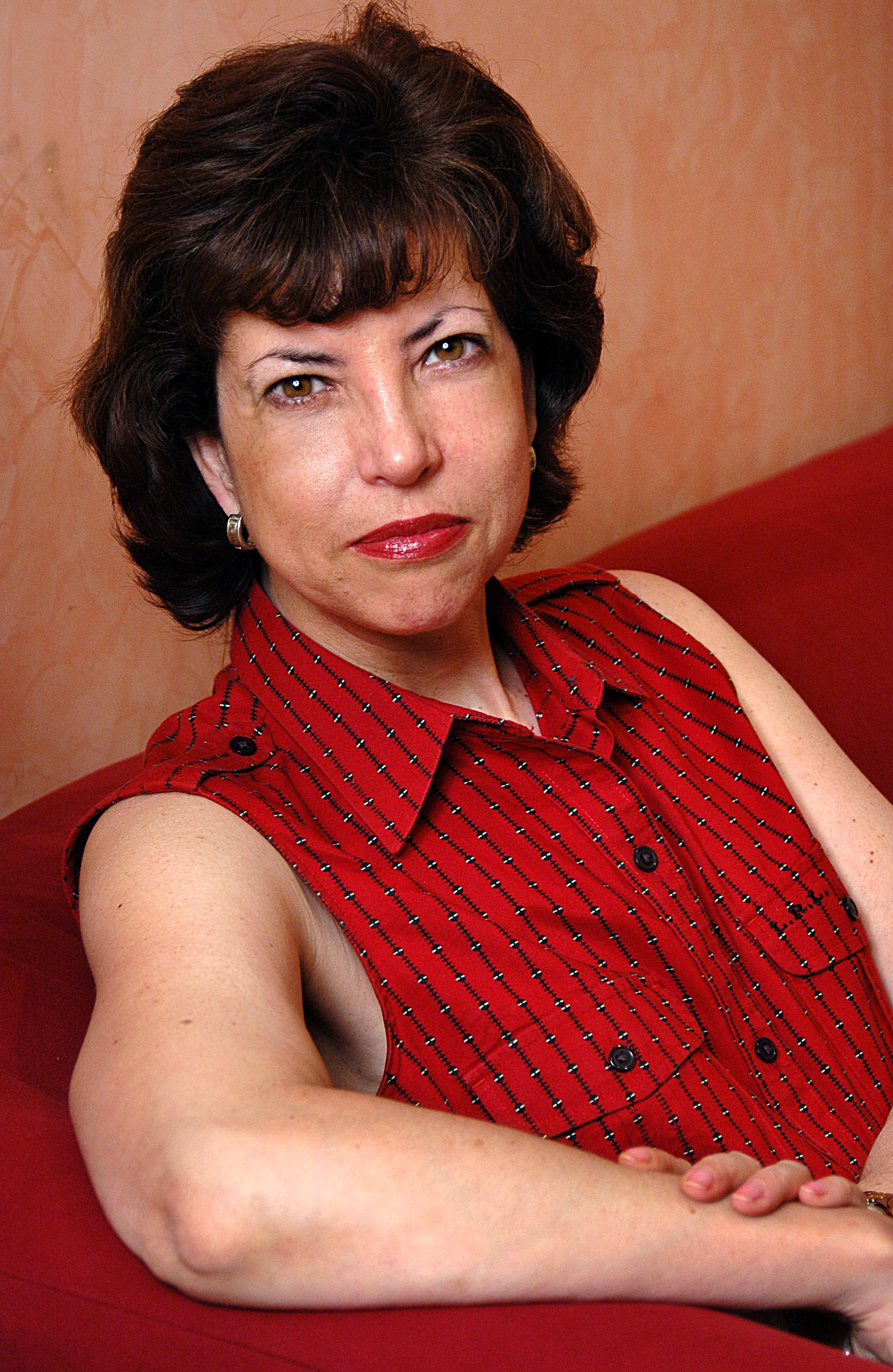

Roser Caminals-Heath is an author and professor. She earned her Bachelor's, Master's, and Doctoral degrees at the University of Barcelona.

She is the author of five novels written in Catalan. She has also translated other authors novels like, The House of Ulloa, by Emilia Pardo Bazán, and A Matter of Self-Esteem and Other Stories by Carme Riera, the latter in cooperation with 1994 Hood College graduate Holly Cashman. She has also published a non-fiction book, La seducció americana, about her experiences in the United States, as well as essays and reviews in professional journals such as The Georgia Review and The American Book Review. She joined Hood College faculty in 1981.

== Works ==
- Cinc-cents bars i una llibreria, a novel. (Edicions 62, 2010).
- La seducció americana (Edicions 62, 2009)
- La dona de mercuri (Edicions 62, 2006)
- La petita mort (Random House, 2004)
- El carrer dels Tres Llits (Random House, 2002)
- Un segle de prodigis (Columbia University Press, 1995)

=== Works in translation ===
==== Spanish ====
- La mujer de mercurio (Ediciones B, 2007)
- La pequeña muerte (Ediciones B, 2005)
- Amores oscuros (Lumen Editions, 2003)

==== English ====
- Once Remembered, Twice Lived (Original: Un segle de prodigis). Peter Lang Publishing, 1993)
- The Street of the Three Beds (Original: El carrer dels Tres Llits). University Press of the South, 2011.
