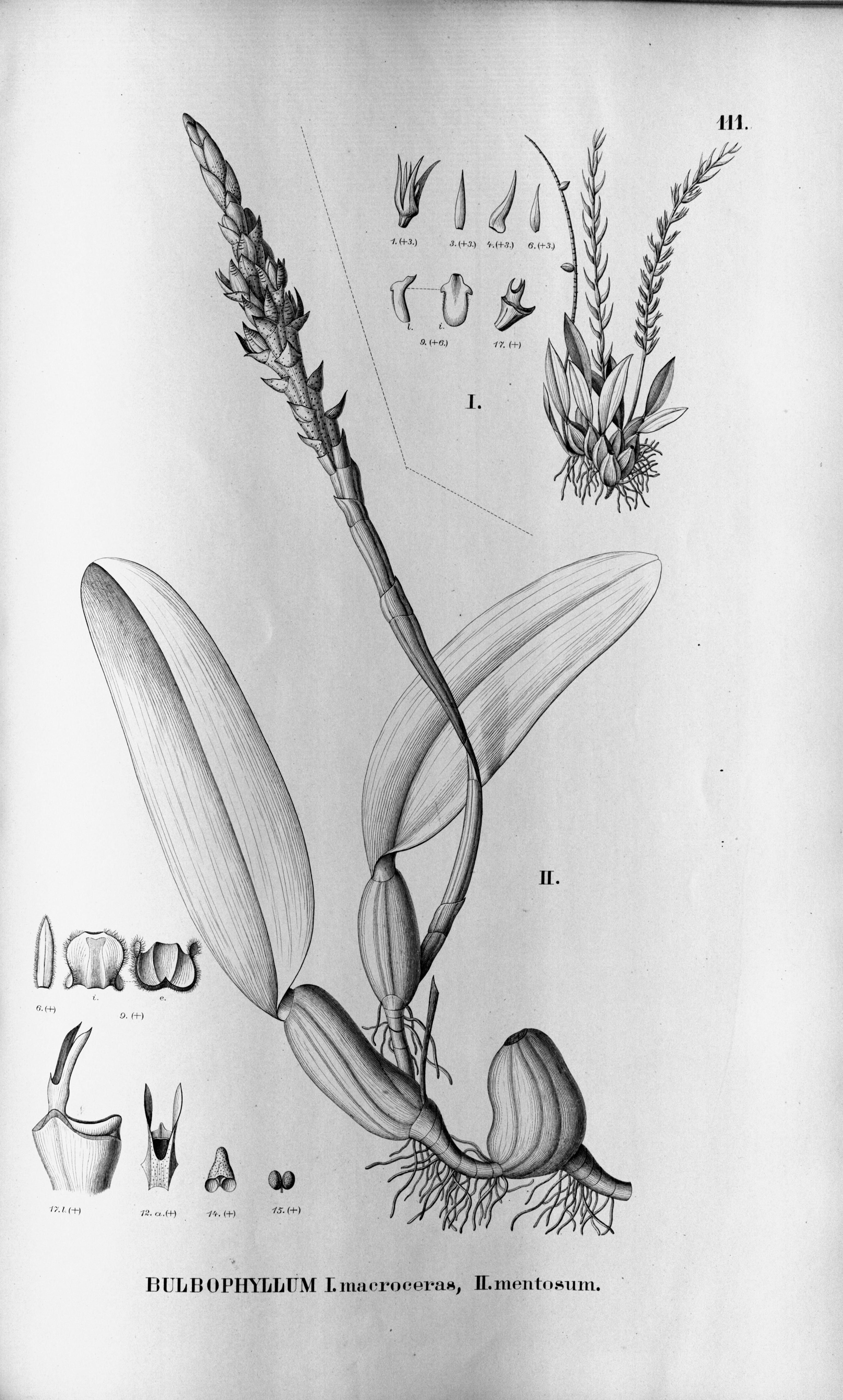

Scientific classification
- Kingdom: Plantae
- Clade: Tracheophytes
- Clade: Angiosperms
- Clade: Monocots
- Order: Asparagales
- Family: Orchidaceae
- Subfamily: Epidendroideae
- Genus: Bulbophyllum
- Section: Bulbophyllum sect. Micranthae
- Species: B. macroceras

Binomial name
- Bulbophyllum macroceras Barb. Rodr.

= Bulbophyllum macroceras =

Species of orchid

Bulbophyllum macroceras is a species of orchid in the genus Bulbophyllum.
