= Bedotia tricolor =

Conservation status
- Critically Endangered (IUCN 3.1)

Scientific classification
- Kingdom: Animalia
- Phylum: Chordata
- Class: Actinopterygii
- Order: Atheriniformes
- Family: Bedotiidae
- Genus: Bedotia
- Species: B. tricolor

Binomial name
- Bedotia tricolor Pellegrin, 1932

Species of fish

Bedotia tricolor is a species of Madagascar rainbowfish endemic to Madagascar. Its natural habitat is rivers. It is threatened by habitat loss. This species was described by Jacques Pellegrin in 1932 with the type locality given as a tributary of the Faraony River in the area of Manakara.
