= Marcia Coyle =

American legal reporter (born 1952)

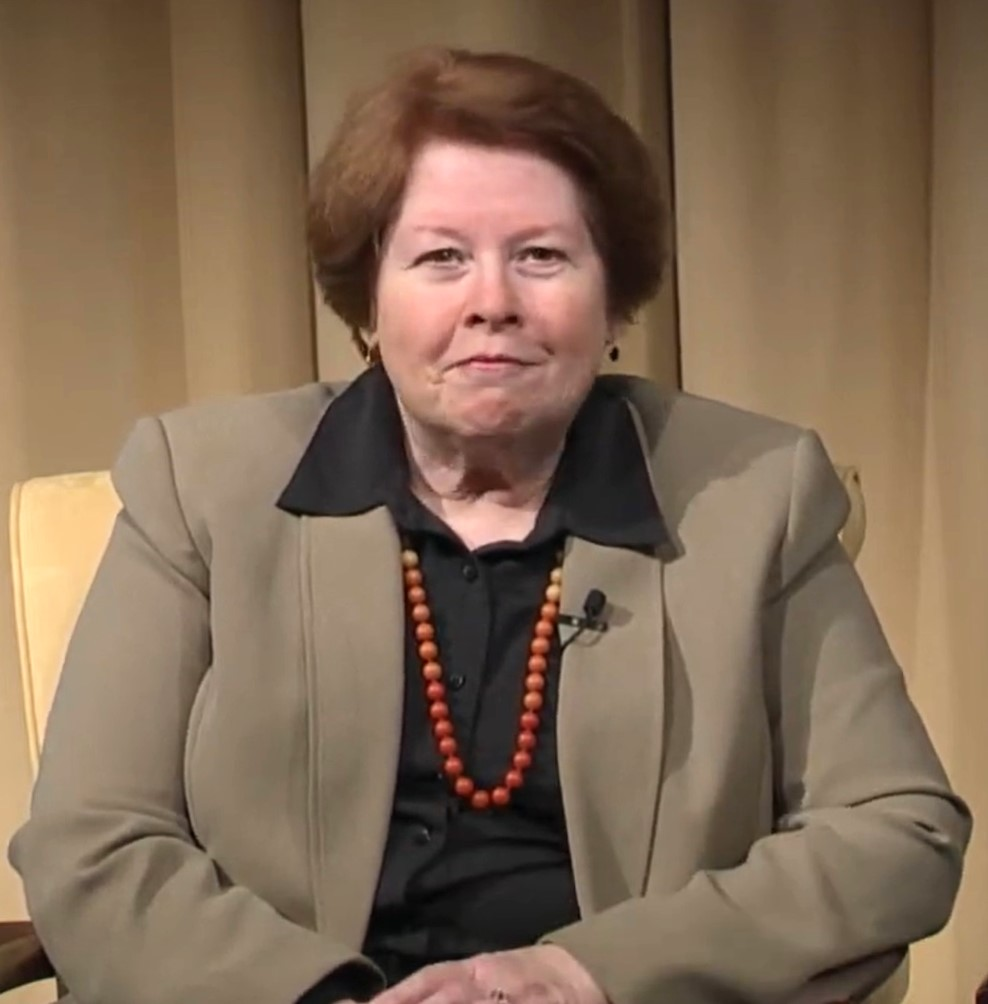
Coyle in 2014

Marcia Coyle (born 1952) is an American legal reporter. She covered the United States Supreme Court for The National Law Journal for almost thirty years until retiring from the Journal in 2022. She is a regular contributing reporter to the PBS News Hour on matters concerning the Supreme Court.

== Early life and education ==
Coyle grew up in Pennsylvania. She earned a BA from Hood College, a master's degree from Northwestern University's Medill School of Journalism and a Juris Doctor degree from the University of Baltimore School of Law.

== Career ==
In 1974, Coyle began working as a journalist for the Call-Chronicle of Allentown, Pennsylvania. She got her start at the paper writing obituaries. She later covered state government and politics, and was based in the state capital of Harrisburg. In 1984, the Call-Chronicle opened a Washington bureau and assigned Coyle to organize and oversee it. She was hired by The National Law Journal in 1987 and ultimately became the Journal's chief Washington correspondent. In the mid-2000s, Coyle began providing news analysis on the U.S. Supreme Court for the PBS News Hour and continued to do so into 2025. During a segment with Coyle on the April 30, 2025, edition of the News Hour, it was revealed that this appearance would be her final report on the Supreme Court for the program, as she intends to shift more of her time to writing about the court and "spending ... more time with [her] grandchildren".

In 1995, she contributed to the book A Year in the Life of the Supreme Court. In 2013, she authored the book The Roberts Court: The Struggle for the Constitution.

Coyle retired from The National Law Journal in December 2022.

== Awards and honors ==
Coyle received the 1992 George Polk Award for Legal Reporting. In November 2000, she received the Toni House Journalism Award from the American Judicature Society for her total body of work. In 2021, she received the Gavel Award of the American Judges Association.

== Personal ==
Coyle married Raymond E. DiBiagio Jr. in May 1984 and sometimes uses the name Marcia Coyle DiBiagio.
