= Bulbophyllum mucronifolium =

Scientific classification
- Kingdom: Plantae
- Clade: Tracheophytes
- Clade: Angiosperms
- Clade: Monocots
- Order: Asparagales
- Family: Orchidaceae
- Subfamily: Epidendroideae
- Genus: Bulbophyllum
- Section: Bulbophyllum sect. Micranthae
- Species: B. mucronifolium

Binomial name
- Bulbophyllum mucronifolium Rchb. f. & Warm.

Synonyms
- Phyllorkis mucronifolia (Rchb.f. & Warm.) Kuntze 1891

Species of orchid

Bulbophyllum mucronifolium is a species of orchid in the genus Bulbophyllum.
