= NPH USA =

American nonprofit organization

- Founded: 1965
- Type: nonprofit organization
- Tax ID no.: 20-5905144
- Legal status: 501(c)(3)
- Purpose: To facilitate and support homes for orphaned, abandoned and needy children in which they receive food, clothing, health care, and education in a Christian family environment based on the principles of unconditional acceptance and love, sharing, work, and responsibility.
- Location: Chicago, Illinois, U.S.; Regional Offices: Bellevue, Washington; Scottsdale, Arizona; Saint Paul, Minnesota; Chicago, Illinois; Miami, Florida
- Region served: Bolivia, the Dominican Republic, El Salvador, Guatemala, Haiti, Honduras, Mexico, Nicaragua, and Peru
- Method: Financial support of Nuestros Pequeños Hermanos network of orphanages in Latin America and the Caribbean.
- CFO & COO: Christian Emanuel Delgado
- VP of Donor Engagement/Strategy: Jill Adams McDonough
- Director of Gift Planning: Chuck Allworth
- Revenue: $18,697,493 (2022)
- Expenses: $17,834,469 (2022)
- Employees: 40 (2023)
- Website: www.nphusa.org
- Formerly called: Friends of the Orphans

NPH USA is a non-profit organization operating in Latin America and the Caribbean to support the homes, health services, and educational programs of Nuestros Pequeños Hermanos (NPH, Spanish for "Our Little Brothers and Sisters"). They aim to help children overcome poverty and become leaders in their own communities.

NPH is fully supporting nearly 3,100 boys and girls in Bolivia, the Dominican Republic, El Salvador, Guatemala, Haiti, Honduras, Mexico, Nicaragua, and Peru. An additional 3,200 community children receive scholarships, meals, health care, and other support. More than 114,000 services were provided through community outreach programs in 2018.

== History ==
In 1954, a homeless boy was arrested for stealing from the poor box of a small church in Cuernavaca, Mexico. The church's priest, Father William Wasson of Phoenix, Arizona, refused to press charges and asked for custody of the boy. Within a few days, eight more boys found a home with Wasson. He gave them a safe environment and a chance to turn their lives around. By year's end, 32 boys were in his care and Nuestros Pequeños Hermanos was born.

Wasson's devotion to the care of orphans inspired an outpouring of financial support and volunteer helpers for his humanitarian cause. NPH USA traces its roots to Wasson's family and friends in Arizona, who sent clothes, food and money. In 1965, Friends of Our Little Brothers was incorporated in Arizona as a non-profit organization.. Affiliated but separate non-profit support groups called NPH USA were created in Minnesota (1986), Washington (1988) and Illinois (1999). An organization in Virginia, Our Little Brothers and Sisters (OLB&S), helped start fundraising offices in Europe as well as Canada.

In 2005, the offices in Arizona, Illinois, Minnesota, and Washington State became regional offices of the national organization – NPH USA. In addition, new regional offices were formed in Florida and Virginia. The new offices were made possible by the fundraising support of OLB&S.

== Programs ==
Children at NPH homes – called pequeños – are not available for adoption; instead they form a part of a larger, stable, permanent family environment at the homes, giving them a chance to focus on education and personal growth. They are taught the values of work, sharing and responsibility in a Christian environment. Each has the opportunity to finish a technical course or seek a university degree. All children are asked to give back a year or more of service to NPH. Through this act of gratitude, each graduate shares the responsibility of raising the family.

Former pequeños are educators, doctors, accountants, carpenters, farmers, mechanics, artists, administrators and social workers. Some work for NPH, while others support NPH USA and NPH by sponsoring children, organizing fundraisers, or attending special events and serving as ambassadors for the organization.

NPH homes strive to be self-sufficient and most operate their own schools, clinics, gardens and farms. For example, at NPH Honduras, all of the fixtures and furniture, as well as most of the clothes and shoes used by the children, are made by pequeños in vocational workshops, while NPH Mexico produces enough livestock, fish, fruits and vegetables to satisfy most of the children's needs. What the homes are unable to provide internally is donated by supporters from around the world.

== Organizational structure ==
NPH USA is governed by a volunteer Board of Directors. In addition, each of the six regional offices has its own volunteer Board of Directors. Board members have diverse professional backgrounds and expertise, but each actively works to raise funds for and awareness of NPH USA.

The national office is located in Chicago.

== Relationship with NPH ==
There is close collaboration and cooperation between NPH USA and NPH. NPH USA is a fundraising organization whose primary purpose is to provide financial support to raise, nurture and educate children living at NPH homes. In the process, NPH USA staff meet with NPH leadership to review programs, approve budgets, plan tours to homes, arrange fundraising events, and support other NPH activities. NPH USA representatives visit the homes in order to experience NPH programs first-hand.

== Financial Information ==
According to NPH USA's 2022 financial statements, 76% of their financial resources were spent on programs, with 9% going to administration and 15% going to fundraising.

In 2022, they had a total revenue of $18.6 million, 80% of which came in donor contributions ($14.9 million).

To read the latest on their financials: https://reports.nphusa.org/nph-usa-financials
