= Bulbophyllum adiamantinum =

Scientific classification
- Kingdom: Plantae
- Clade: Tracheophytes
- Clade: Angiosperms
- Clade: Monocots
- Order: Asparagales
- Family: Orchidaceae
- Subfamily: Epidendroideae
- Genus: Bulbophyllum
- Section: Bulbophyllum sect. Micranthae
- Species: B. adiamantinum

Binomial name
- Bulbophyllum adiamantinum Brade

Species of orchid

Bulbophyllum adiamantinum is a species of flowering plant in the orchid family, Orchidaceae. It is endemic to Southeast Brazil.
