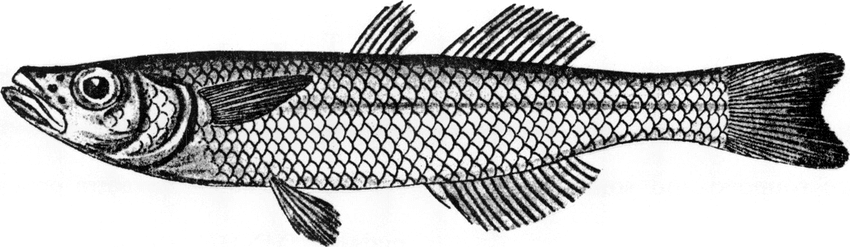
- Rheocles alaotrensis

Scientific classification
- Kingdom: Animalia
- Phylum: Chordata
- Class: Actinopterygii
- Order: Atheriniformes
- Family: Bedotiidae
- Genus: Rheocles; D. S. Jordan & C. L. Hubbs, 1919

Type species
- Eleotris sikorae Sauvage, 1891

Synonyms
- Rheocloides Nichols and La Monte, 1931

= Rheocles =

Genus of fishes

Rheocles is a genus of Madagascar rainbowfish. Rheocles has a restricted distribution, being found only in certain forested freshwater habitats in the central and eastern highlands of Madagascar including the Nosivolo River. The genus appears to feed almost exclusively on allochthonous material, primarily insects falling onto the water surface.

== Taxonomy ==
In a 1990 study, this genus is monophyletic. However, in a 2004 analysis, it was found that Rheocles was paraphyletic, forming two distinct clades. R. alaotrensis, R. lateralis, and R. wrightae (all species that are not discernibly sexually dimorphic was recovered as the sister taxon of the rest of the bedotiids, including Bedotia sister to R. vatosa + R. derhami. R. pellegrini and R. sikorae were excluded from this study due to lack of available material, however, R. sikorae is considered to be the sister taxon to R. wrightae.

== Species ==
There are currently seven recognized species in this genus:

- Rheocles alaotrensis (Pellegrin, 1914) (Katrana)
- Rheocles derhami Stiassny & D. M. Rodríguez, 2001
- Rheocles lateralis Stiassny & Reinthal, 1992
- Rheocles pellegrini (Nichols & La Monte, 1931)
- Rheocles sikorae (Sauvage, 1891)
- Rheocles vatosoa Stiassny, D. M. Rodríguez & Loiselle, 2002
- Rheocles wrightae Stiassny, 1990

== Description ==
Rheocles species are robust bedotiids with little lateral body compression. R. vatosa and R. derhami are sexually dimorphic, with males exhibiting larger adult size, enhanced coloration and pigmentation, as well as pronounced development of the unpaired fins.

== Conservation ==
Its close association with forested biotopes suggests that, like so many other rainforest-adapted series, Rheocles is extremely vulnerable to deforestation pressure.
