= Anita Jose =

Indian-born, American academic

Anita Jose (born 1960-1970s) is an Indian-born educator, business strategist, Professor of Management at Hood College, and essayist in the field of business management and policy.

== Life and work ==
Jose was born in India, and emigrate to the United States. In the 1990s she received her doctorate from the University of North Texas and her MBA and MMGT from the University of Dallas.

By 1999 she had started her academic career and was assistant professor at Hood College. By 2017 she is Professor of Management and Director of the MBA Program at Hood College. She is member of the Editorial/Review Board of the Journal of American Society of Business and Behavioral Sciences, the Society for the Advancement of Management Conference, and the SAM Advanced Management Journal.

Her research has included a focus in the areas of organizational strategy, international management, and business ethics/corporate social responsibility. She has done extensive research in EEOC programs and workplace conflict resolution with the Center of conflict Resolution at Salisbury University. She has over 15 essays publications in professional journals and is a guest presenter and speaker at many conferences. Her commentary has appeared in newspapers and television throughout the U.S and in India. Her research, reports, and articles have appeared in varied publications like the Journal of Business Ethics, Southern Law Journal, Business Intelligence, and Advances in Industrial Relations Research.

== Selected publications ==
- McDermott, P., Obar, R., Jose, A., & Bowers, M. (2000). An evaluation of the equal employment opportunity commission mediation program. EEOC Order, (9/0900), 7632.

Articles, a selection

- Jose, Anita, and Mary S. Thibodeaux. "Institutionalization of ethics: The perspective of managers." Journal of Business Ethics 22.2 (1999): 133-143.
- Jose, Anita, and Shang-Mei Lee. "Environmental reporting of global corporations: A content analysis based on website disclosures." Journal of Business Ethics 72.4 (2007): 307-321.
