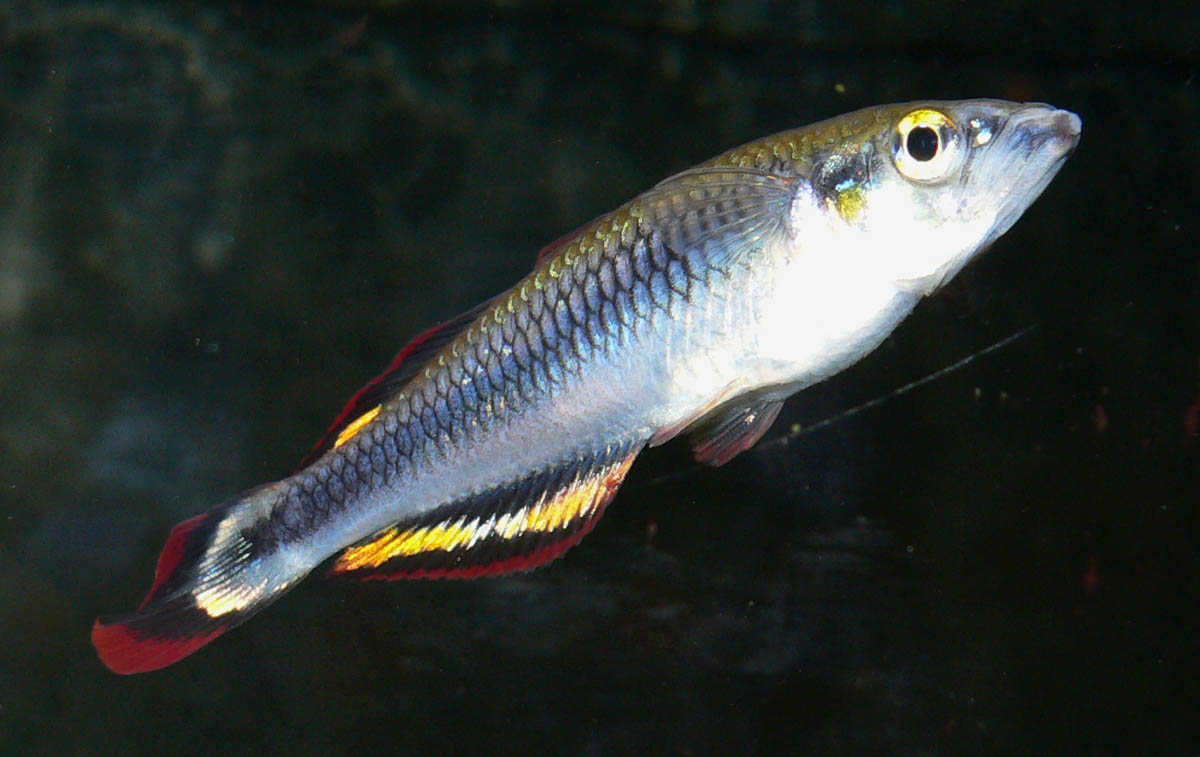
- Bedotia sp.

Scientific classification
- Kingdom: Animalia
- Phylum: Chordata
- Class: Actinopterygii
- Division: Teleostei
- Order: Atheriniformes
- Family: Bedotiidae
- Genus: Bedotia; Regan, 1903

Type species
- Bedotia madagascariensis Regan, 1903

= Bedotia =

Genus of fishes

Bedotia is a genus of the family Bedotiidae of fishes endemic to Madagascar.

== Taxonomy ==
This genus is monophyletic. Little is known regarding phylogenetic interrelationships of the numerous populations of Bedotia of eastern Madagascar, and the genus is in need of systematic revision. One author synonymized B. longianalis and B. tricolor with B. geayi with no justification. It is apparent that several species of Bedotia exist, although many of these are new to science and await description, whereas the taxonomic status of many nominal species remains uncertain.

A 2004 study supported three major, more or less geographically distinct, clades of Bedotia, one comprising species with distributions ranging from mid- to southeastern Madagascar (B. madagascariensis, B. geayi, and B. tricolor, plus four undescribed species), another including species restricted to eastern drainages north of the Masoala Peninsula (B. marojejy, plus four undescribed species), and a third comprising species with distributions extending from the Masoala Peninsula southward to the Ivoloina River (B. longianalis and B. masoala, plus three undescribed species). These three clades of Bedotia are not readily separated based on coloration or pigmentation pattern.

== Species ==
There are currently nine recognized species in this genus:

- Bedotia albomarginata Sparks & Rush, 2005
- Bedotia alveyi C. C. Jones, W. L. Smith & Sparks, 2010 (Makira rainbowfish)
- Bedotia geayi Pellegrin, 1907 (Red-tailed silverside)
- Bedotia leucopteron Loiselle & D. M. Rodríguez, 2007
- Bedotia longianalis Pellegrin, 1914
- Bedotia madagascariensis Regan, 1903
- Bedotia marojejy Stiassny & I. J. Harrison, 2000
- Bedotia masoala Sparks, 2001
- Bedotia tricolor Pellegrin, 1932

Additionally, several undescribed species have been rated by the IUCN:

- Bedotia sp. nov. 'Ankavia-Ankavanana'
- Bedotia sp. nov. 'Bemarivo'
- Bedotia sp. nov. 'Betampona'
- Bedotia sp. nov. 'Garassa'
- Bedotia sp. nov. 'Lazana'
- Bedotia sp. nov. 'Mahanara'
- Bedotia sp. nov. 'Manombo'
- Bedotia sp. nov. 'Namorona'
- Bedotia sp. nov. 'Nosivola'
- Bedotia sp. nov. 'Sambava'

== Description ==
Bedotia species are all under 10 centimetres (4 in) SL, extremely colorful, elongate, and somewhat laterally compressed atherinid fishes that exhibit varying degrees of sexual dimorphism. Except for coloration and pigmentation, Bedotia are morphologically conservative fishes. All Bedotia are sexually dimorphic, with males exhibiting larger adult size, enhanced coloration and pigmentation, as well as pronounced development of the unpaired fins.

== Ecology ==
Bedotia is exclusively freshwater, and members are found in small to medium-sized forested rivers and streams, and to a lesser degree in swamps and marshes, along the eastern slope of Madagascar.

== Etymology ==
The genus is named after the Swiss zoologist Maurice Bedot (1859-1927) who was director of the Muséum d'histoire naturelle de Genève where the type of B. madagascarensis was lodged and who was editor of Revue suisse de Zoologie in which Regan's description was published in 1903.
