= William Wasson =

Father William B. Wasson (December 21, 1923 - August 16, 2006) was an American Catholic priest. He was born in Phoenix, Arizona, United States, but moved to Mexico where he trained as a priest. In 1954, he founded Nuestros Pequeños Hermanos, a charity for orphans and neglected and abandoned children, which today operates across Latin America. Wasson died in August 2006 in Arizona, due to complications arising from a hip injury.

== Published works ==
- Luke XV
- The Sermon on the Mount
- Gospel in the Dust

== Achievements and awards ==
- Golden Plate Award of the American Academy of Achievement - 1962
- Luis Elizondo Humanitarian Award - 1977

This is the Mexican National Prize and was given for his contribution to the children of Mexico. He is the only US citizen to receive this award.

- Good Samaritan Award from the National Catholic Development Conference - 1979
- Franciscan International Award - 1981
- Order of the Aztec Eagle - 1990

This is Mexico's highest award, and recognizes services performed for Mexico or humanity by foreign nationals. This was the first time a priest had been honored.

- National Caring Award by the Caring Institute of Washington DC - 1997
- KFC's Colonel's Way Award - 1998
- El Sol de Nuestra Communidad Award - 1998

This was presented by the Hispanic Community of Phoenix, Arizona.

- Kellogg’s Hannah Neil World of Children Award - 2000

This is a $100,000 prize given to individuals who make a difference in the world of children.

- Jefferson Award for Public Service - 2003

This is recognized as the “Nobel Prize” for public service in America. Fr. Wasson was recognized for his volunteer service to the Hispanic community.

- Ivy Humanitarian Award by the Ivy Inter-American Foundation - 2005

This was for working to improve the lives of children and their communities in the Americas

- Opus Prize Finalist - 2005

Wasson was awarded $100,000 for his "driving entrepreneurial mindset with an abiding faith to combat poverty, illiteracy, hunger, disease and injustice".

== External links and references ==
- Washington Post Obituary
- Opus Prize
- Nuestros Pequeños Hermanos Homepage
- Report of World of Children award

Specific
