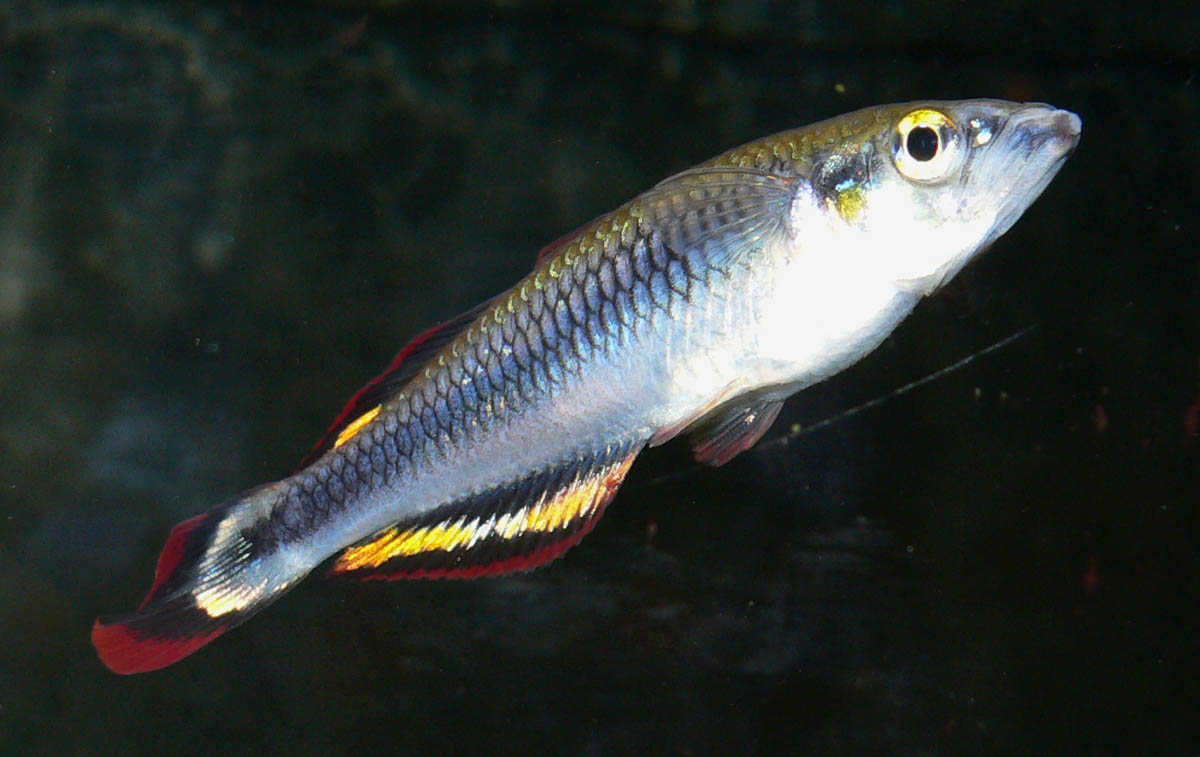
- Bedotia madagascariensis

Scientific classification
- Kingdom: Animalia
- Phylum: Chordata
- Class: Actinopterygii
- Order: Atheriniformes
- Suborder: Atherinoidei
- Family: Bedotiidae; Regan, 1903

Genera
- Bedotia; Rheocles

= Bedotiidae =

Family of fishes

Bedotiidae are a family of fish in the order Atheriniformes. They are closely related to the Australian rainbowfish family Melanotaeniidae, and were formerly placed in it as a subfamily, but are now considered a distinct family. They are commonly known as the Madagascar rainbowfish, Madagascan rainbowfish, or Malagasy rainbowfish due to their endemism to Madagascar. It includes two genera, Bedotia and Rheocles.

== Taxonomy ==
This family is monophyletic and includes the two genera Bedotia and Rheocles, with at least 16 species. This group is considered by Nelson, 2016 Fishes of the World to be a subfamily of the family Melanotaeniidae. However, more recent authorities such as Eschmeyer's Catalog of Fishes treat it as its own family.

When treated as a family it has been placed by some authorities in a suborder Melanotaenioidei which includes the sister groups Bedotiidae and Melanotaeniidae, as well as Pseudomugilidae (including Telmatherininae). Previously, it was thought that the sister-group relationship between these taxa could be most parsimoniously explained by the break-up of Gondwana. However, recent studies incorporating molecular phylogenetics suggest that these groups only diverged during the Eocene, much too recent to be explained by Gondwanan vicariance. Thus, these groups are now thought to descend from a common marine ancestor that independently evolved a freshwater lifestyle on different continents.

== Anatomy and morphology ==
As the common name rainbowfish implies, they are generally colorful fishes. Bedotiins are elongated, laterally compressed, and rarely exceed 100 mm in standard length. Bedotiins exhibit varying degrees of sexual dimorphism, which is quite pronounced in some species. The anal fin spine is weak or absent.

== Distribution ==
The entire family of Bedotiidae is endemic to Madagascar. Bedotiins occur exclusively in freshwater environments and are distributed in small to medium-sized forested rivers and streams, occasionally in swamps and marshes, spanning nearly the entire eastern slope of Madagascar (R. derhami is recorded from a westward draining Sofia River basin in the northeast of the island).

Bedotiin fishes are under severe threat because of rapid deforestation and habitat modification throughout most of their range. Because Bedotia and Rheocles are generally the first to exhibit population declines or disappear from areas where habitat is moderately to highly disturbed or degraded, they are reliable indicators of ecosystem health and stability.
